= St. John's Church, Stargard =

Church in Stargard, Poland

Church of St. John the Baptist
- Parish Church of St. Joseph's Parish in Stargard, Poland
- Kościół pw. św. Jana Chrzciciela w Stargardzie
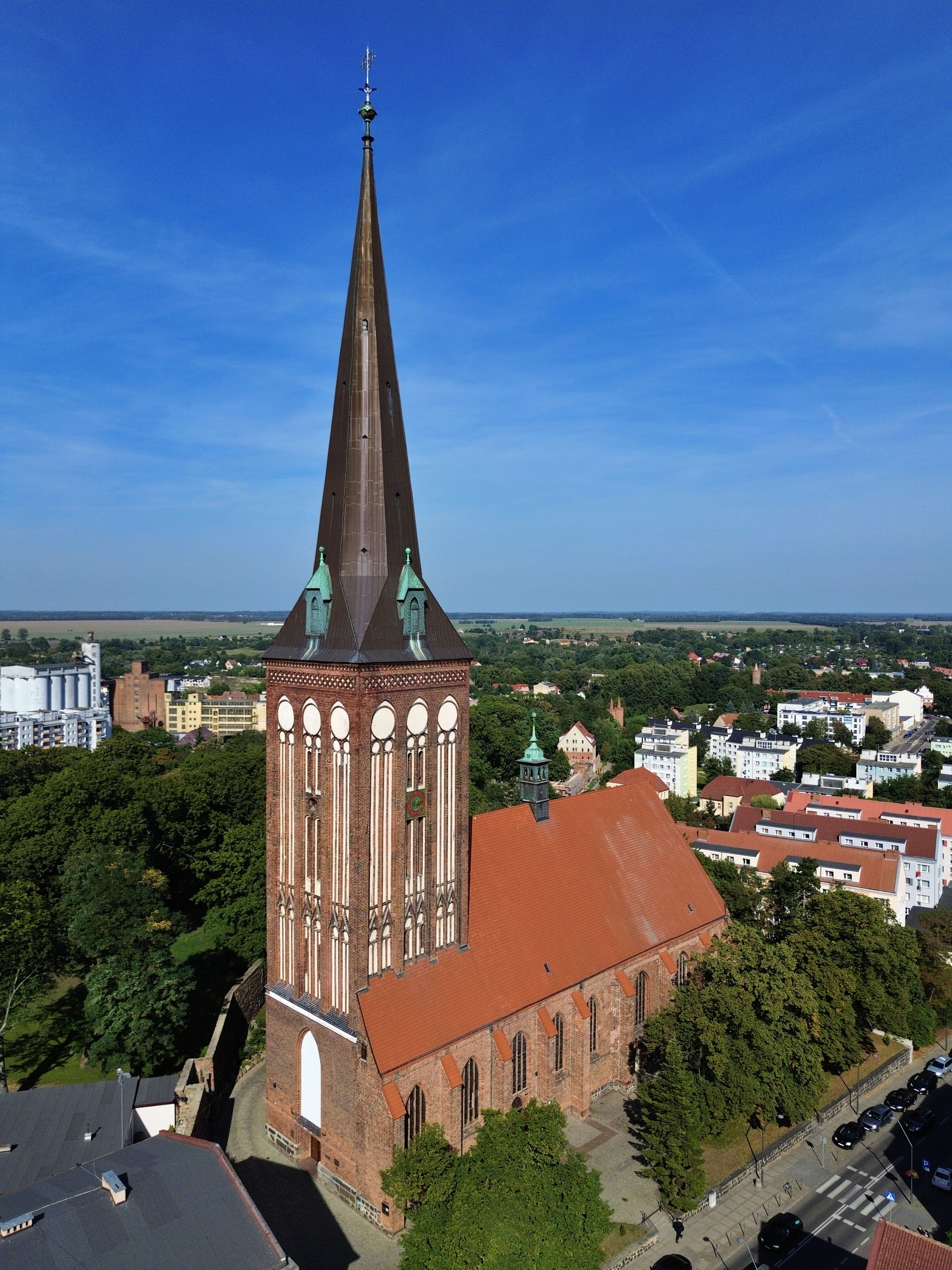

- Location of the Church of St. John the Baptist in Stargard
- 53°20′21″N 15°02′28″E
- Location: Stargard, Poland
- Address: ul. Św. Jana Chrzciciela 1
- Country: Poland
- Denomination: Catholic Church
- Tradition: Roman Rite
- Religious institute: Society of Christ
- Website: swjozef.stargard.pl

Administration
- Archdiocese: Archdiocese of Szczecin-Kamień

Clergy
- Archbishop: apostolic administrator Zbigniew Zieliński
- Pastor: Krzysztof Wąchała SChr

Saint John's Church is a Roman Catholic church dedicated to St. John the Baptist in Stargard, Poland. The parish church of the parish of St. Joseph (named after the former church located nearby), branch churches are located in Grabowo, Kiczarowo and Klępino. Church of St. John has the right of patronage over city churches.

== History ==
It was built in the first half of the 15th century as a result of the expansion of the chapel previously erected by the Knights of St. John. Relics of this 13th-century Romanesque temple, in the form of granite blocks, were built into the pillars of the main nave of the present presbytery.

From the inscription on the plaque placed in the tower, we learn that the construction of the new church began in 1408, and the date 1464, placed on the large bell, suggests that it was the time when the construction of the tower and the entire church were completed.

In accordance with the spirit of the era, the hall-shaped church, maintained in the Gothic style, has some solutions modeled on St. Mary's Collegiate Church. We can see this similarity in the ambulatory with chapels around the main altar and in the decorations of the tower . Star vaults were used in the central nave, and cross vaults in the aisles . The temple was fortunately avoided by the fires that haunted the medieval city. However, in 1540 and 1697, as a result of a storm and perhaps construction errors, the tower was destroyed twice, which, falling, crushed the vaultand tower chapels. After the second rather quick, but incomplete reconstruction, the tower received a gable roof. It survived nearly two centuries. The tower, and precisely its conical helmet, dates from 1892. It is 99 m high and is one of the highest in Western Pomerania.

In the spring of 1998, during the renovation of the top of the tower, a collection of documents and coins was discovered along with a letter from the pastor of the church, dated August 17, 1893, placed in a metal ball. The discovered items were handed over to the City Museum at the Old Town Square, and their place was taken by information about contemporary Stargard and a message to future generations.

After Stargard was taken over by the Polish authorities in 1945, the church was initially taken over by the state, but on September 12, 1945, the State Repatriation Office handed it over to the Roman Church . Priests from the Society of Christ for Polish Diaspora Abroad took care of the church, and they proceeded with successive renovation and furnishing.

First, the roof was repaired and the two artillery shells that were stuck in the turret were removed. In 1946, the wall in the tower was pierced on the west side, and thus a new main entrance was created. In 1954, the windows were glazed and the roof was renovated again. The worn brick floor was replaced in 1957 with a marble one. During these works, 3 chalices, a jug and 2 silver candlesticks were found hidden in an old heating duct . In the main nave, coffins were found, which were covered with rubble and concrete intact. In addition, two bells were repaired .

In 1958–1961 the interior was painted. As part of the renovation, polychromes by prof. Hopper; new benches were also provided. In the period 1968–1973, a set of stained glass windows was installed in the workshop of W. Ostrzołek in Katowice and the external walls were renovated. The chandeliers come from 1976, and the new marble altar from 1978. The construction of the new sacristy and the repainting of the interior were carried out in the years 1980–1983.

In 2004, the replacement of the cross and the copper roof sheathing began. On September 17, 2010, a memorial plaque dedicated to the victims of the crash of the Polish Tu-154 in Smolensk was unveiled in the Altar of the Fatherland in the church.

== Furnishing ==
Until World War II, the church of St. John was richly furnished. Its most valuable element was a large, late- Gothic St. John's polyptych from the second half of the 15th century, the work of a Pomeranian workshop, but with visible influences from the art of Hamburg and Rostock. In the sanctuary there were large sculptures of Mary and Christ and scenes from the life of St. John. It was dismantled before the war in 1945 and deposited in the branch church in Tychów. It was donated to the National Museum in Szczecin. The church's Baroque pulpit was taken deep into Germany in 1945.

The organ built by the organ builder Wagner comes from 1731. In the northern part of the church, next to the sacristy, there are fifteen-century four-seat stalls with carved walls. In 2005, the relics of St. Rafał Kalinowski were placed on permanent display in the Church.
