= Krzywnica =

- Village
- Location within Poland
- Coordinates: 53°25′45″N 15°11′32″E
- Country: Poland
- Voivodeship: West Pomeranian
- County: Stargard
- Gmina: Stara Dąbrowa

Krzywnica [kʂɨvˈnit͡sa] (German: Uchtenhagen) is a village in the administrative district of Gmina Stara Dąbrowa, within Stargard County, West Pomeranian Voivodeship, in north-western Poland. It lies approximately 4 km (2 mi) east of Stara Dąbrowa, 15 km (9 mi) north-east of Stargard, and 41 km (25 mi) east of the regional capital Szczecin.

== Climate ==
The climate is temperate, with mild winters and warm summers. The average temperature in January is -1 °C–-5 °C, and in July +17 °C–+19 °C. Precipitation is 500–800 mm.
