= Rekowo, Stargard County =

Rekowo
- Village
- Location within Poland
- Coordinates: 53°19′19″N 14°49′20″E
- Country: Poland
- Voivodeship: West Pomeranian
- County: Stargard
- Gmina: Kobylanka
- Population: 47

Rekowo [rɛˈkɔvɔ] (German: Reckow) is a village in the administrative district of Gmina Kobylanka, within Stargard County, West Pomeranian Voivodeship, in north-western Poland. It lies approximately 5 km (3 mi) south-west of Kobylanka, 15 km (9 mi) west of Stargard, and 20 km (12 mi) south-east of the regional capital Szczecin.

For the history of the region, see History of Pomerania.

The village has a population of 47.
