= Dalewo, Stargard County =

Dalewo
- Village
- Location within Poland
- Coordinates: 53°23′1″N 15°10′33″E
- Country: Poland
- Voivodeship: West Pomeranian
- County: Stargard
- Gmina: Marianowo

Dalewo [daˈlɛvɔ] (German: Dahlow) is a village in the administrative district of Gmina Marianowo, within Stargard County, West Pomeranian Voivodeship, in north-western Poland. It lies approximately 6 km (4 mi) west of Marianowo, 11 km (7 mi) north-east of Stargard, and 40 km (25 mi) east of the regional capital Szczecin.
