= Łęczyca, West Pomeranian Voivodeship =

Łęczyca
- Village
- Location within Poland
- Coordinates: 53°26′21″N 15°4′22″E
- Country: Poland
- Voivodeship: West Pomeranian
- County: Stargard
- Gmina: Stara Dąbrowa

Łęczyca (pronounced [wɛnˈt͡ʂɨt͡sa]; German: Lenz) is a village in the administrative district of Gmina Stara Dąbrowa, within Stargard County, West Pomeranian Voivodeship, in north-western Poland. It lies approximately 5 km (3 mi) west of Stara Dąbrowa, 13 km (8 mi) north of Stargard, and 33 km (21 mi) east of the regional capital Szczecin.
