= Sulino, Stargard County =

Sulino
- Village
- Location within Poland
- Coordinates: 53°20′10″N 15°18′58″E
- Country: Poland
- Voivodeship: West Pomeranian
- County: Stargard
- Gmina: Marianowo

Sulino [suˈlinɔ], (German: Goldbeck) is a village in the administrative district of Gmina Marianowo, within Stargard County, West Pomeranian Voivodeship, in north-western Poland. It lies approximately 7 km (4 mi) south-east of Marianowo, 19 km (12 mi) east of Stargard, and 50 km (31 mi) east of the regional capital Szczecin.
