= Moskorze =

- Settlement
- Location within Poland
- Coordinates: 53°25′33″N 15°5′52″E
- Country: Poland
- Voivodeship: West Pomeranian
- County: Stargard
- Gmina: Stara Dąbrowa

Moskorze [mɔsˈkɔʐɛ] (German: Lenz Ilsenhof) is a settlement in the administrative district of Gmina Stara Dąbrowa, within Stargard County, West Pomeranian Voivodeship, in north-western Poland. It lies approximately 3 km (2 mi) west of Stara Dąbrowa, 12 km (7 mi) north-east of Stargard, and 35 km (22 mi) east of the regional capital Szczecin.
