= Rosowo =

- Village
- Location within Poland
- Coordinates: 53°27′45″N 15°13′55″E
- Country: Poland
- Voivodeship: West Pomeranian
- County: Stargard
- Gmina: Stara Dąbrowa

Rosowo [rɔˈsɔvɔ] (German: Rossow) is a village in the administrative district of Gmina Stara Dąbrowa, within Stargard County, West Pomeranian Voivodeship, in north-western Poland. It lies approximately 8 km (5 mi) north-east of Stara Dąbrowa, 20 km (12 mi) north-east of Stargard, and 44 km (27 mi) east of the regional capital Szczecin.
