= Niedźwiedź, West Pomeranian Voivodeship =

Niedźwiedź
- Village
- Location within Poland
- Coordinates: 53°22′N 14°49′E
- Country: Poland
- Voivodeship: West Pomeranian
- County: Stargard
- Gmina: Kobylanka
- Population: 316

Niedźwiedź [ˈɲɛd͡ʑvjɛt͡ɕ] (German: Barenbruch) is a village in the administrative district of Gmina Kobylanka, within Stargard County, West Pomeranian Voivodeship, in north-western Poland. It lies approximately 5 km (3 mi) north-west of Kobylanka, 15 km (9 mi) west of Stargard, and 17 km (11 mi) east of the regional capital Szczecin.

For the history of the region, see History of Pomerania.

The village has a population of 316.
