= Nowa Dąbrowa, West Pomeranian Voivodeship =

Nowa Dąbrowa
- Village
- Location within Poland
- Coordinates: 53°24′N 15°10′E
- Country: Poland
- Voivodeship: West Pomeranian
- County: Stargard
- Gmina: Stara Dąbrowa
- Population: 320

Nowa Dąbrowa [ˈnɔva dɔmˈbrɔva] (German: Neu Damerow) is a village in the administrative district of Gmina Stara Dąbrowa, within Stargard County, West Pomeranian Voivodeship, in north-western Poland. It lies approximately 4 km (2 mi) south-east of Stara Dąbrowa, 12 km (7 mi) north-east of Stargard, and 39 km (24 mi) east of the regional capital Szczecin.

The village has a population of 320.
