= Krzywiec, West Pomeranian Voivodeship =

Krzywiec
- Village
- Location within Poland
- Coordinates: 53°26′20″N 15°13′9″E
- Country: Poland
- Voivodeship: West Pomeranian
- County: Stargard
- Gmina: Marianowo

Krzywiec [ˈkʂɨvjɛt͡s] (German: Altstadt) is a village in the administrative district of Gmina Marianowo, within Stargard County, West Pomeranian Voivodeship, in north-western Poland. It lies approximately 7 km (4 mi) north-west of Marianowo, 18 km (11 mi) north-east of Stargard, and 43 km (27 mi) east of the regional capital Szczecin.
