= Lipka, West Pomeranian Voivodeship =

Lipka
- Village
- Location within Poland
- Coordinates: 53°15′9″N 15°15′26″E
- Country: Poland
- Voivodeship: West Pomeranian
- County: Stargard
- Gmina: Dolice

Lipka [ˈlipka] (German: Linde) is a village in the administrative district of Gmina Dolice, within Stargard County, West Pomeranian Voivodeship, in north-western Poland. It lies approximately 8 km (5 mi) north-east of Dolice, 18 km (11 mi) south-east of Stargard, and 49 km (30 mi) east of the regional capital Szczecin.
