= Sądów, West Pomeranian Voivodeship =

Sądów
- Village
- Location within Poland
- Coordinates: 53°9′30″N 15°16′44″E
- Country: Poland
- Voivodeship: West Pomeranian
- County: Stargard
- Gmina: Dolice

Sądów [ˈsɔnduf] (German Sandow) is a village in the administrative district of Gmina Dolice, within Stargard County, West Pomeranian Voivodeship, in north-western Poland. It lies approximately 7 km (4 mi) south-east of Dolice, 26 km (16 mi) south-east of Stargard, and 55 km (34 mi) south-east of the regional capital Szczecin.

For the history of the region, see History of Pomerania.
