= Gogolewo, West Pomeranian Voivodeship =

Gogolewo
- Village
- Location within Poland
- Coordinates: 53°22′52″N 15°10′3″E
- Country: Poland
- Voivodeship: West Pomeranian
- County: Stargard
- Gmina: Marianowo

Gogolewo [ɡɔɡɔˈlɛvɔ] (German: Pegelow) is a village in the administrative district of Gmina Marianowo, within Stargard County, West Pomeranian Voivodeship, in north-western Poland. It lies approximately 7 km (4 mi) west of Marianowo, 11 km (7 mi) north-east of Stargard, and 39 km (24 mi) east of the regional capital Szczecin.
