= Czarnkowo, Stargard County =

Czarnkowo
- Village
- Location within Poland
- Coordinates: 53°21′56″N 15°13′52″E
- Country: Poland
- Voivodeship: West Pomeranian
- County: Stargard
- Gmina: Marianowo

Czarnkowo [t͡ʂarnˈkɔvɔ], (German: Zarnikow) is a village in the administrative district of Gmina Marianowo, within Stargard County, West Pomeranian Voivodeship, in north-western Poland. It lies approximately 3 km (2 mi) south-west of Marianowo, 14 km (9 mi) east of Stargard, and 44 km (27 mi) east of the regional capital Szczecin.
