= Parlino =

- Village
- Location within Poland
- Coordinates: 53°27′N 15°3′E
- Country: Poland
- Voivodeship: West Pomeranian
- County: Stargard
- Gmina: Stara Dąbrowa

Parlino [parˈlinɔ] (German: Parlin) is a village in the administrative district of Gmina Stara Dąbrowa, within Stargard County, West Pomeranian Voivodeship, in north-western Poland. It lies approximately 7 km (4 mi) north-west of Stara Dąbrowa, 13 km (8 mi) north of Stargard, and 32 km (20 mi) east of the regional capital Szczecin.
