= Moskorzyn, West Pomeranian Voivodeship =

Moskorzyn
- Village
- Location within Poland
- Coordinates: 53°10′57″N 15°7′14″E
- Country: Poland
- Voivodeship: West Pomeranian
- County: Stargard
- Gmina: Dolice

Moskorzyn [mɔsˈkɔʐɨn] (formerly German Muscherin) is a village in the administrative district of Gmina Dolice, within Stargard County, West Pomeranian Voivodeship, in north-western Poland. It lies approximately 6 km (4 mi) west of Dolice, 18 km (11 mi) south of Stargard, and 45 km (28 mi) south-east of the regional capital Szczecin.

For the history of the region, see History of Pomerania.
