= Smardyń =

- Hamlet
- Location within Poland
- Coordinates: 53°10′10″N 15°15′07″E
- Country: Poland
- Voivodeship: West Pomeranian
- County: Stargard
- Gmina: Dolice
- Time zone: UTC+1 (CET)
  - Summer (DST): UTC+2 (CEST)
- Postal code: 73-115
- Area code: +48 91

Smardyń (Polish: [ˈsmar.dɘ̟ɲ]) is a hamlet in the West Pomeranian Voivodeship, Poland, located within the Gmina Dolice, Stargard County.
