= Wielichówko =

- Village
- Location within Poland
- Coordinates: 53°23′59″N 14°53′5″E
- Country: Poland
- Voivodeship: West Pomeranian
- County: Stargard
- Gmina: Kobylanka
- Population: 60

Wielichówko [vjɛliˈxufkɔ] (German: Münsterberg) is a village in the administrative district of Gmina Kobylanka, within Stargard County, West Pomeranian Voivodeship, in north-western Poland. It lies approximately 6 km (4 mi) north of Kobylanka, 13 km (8 mi) north-west of Stargard, and 21 km (13 mi) east of the regional capital Szczecin.

For the history of the region, see History of Pomerania.

The village has a population of 60.
