= Wiry, West Pomeranian Voivodeship =

Wiry
- Village
- Location within Poland
- Coordinates: 53°29′17″N 15°11′45″E
- Country: Poland
- Voivodeship: West Pomeranian
- County: Stargard
- Gmina: Stara Dąbrowa

Wiry [ˈvirɨ] (German: Vieren) is a village in the administrative district of Gmina Stara Dąbrowa, within Stargard County, West Pomeranian Voivodeship, in north-western Poland. It lies approximately 8 km (5 mi) north-east of Stara Dąbrowa, 21 km (13 mi) north-east of Stargard, and 42 km (26 mi) east of the regional capital Szczecin.
