= Ziemomyśl A =

- Village
- Location within Poland
- Coordinates: 53°10′40″N 15°19′28″E
- Country: Poland
- Voivodeship: West Pomeranian
- County: Stargard
- Gmina: Dolice

Ziemomyśl A (German Schönwerder A) is a village in the administrative district of Gmina Dolice, within Stargard County, West Pomeranian Voivodeship, in north-western Poland. It lies approximately 9 km (6 mi) east of Dolice (Dölitz), 26 km (16 mi) south-east of Stargard (Stargard in Pommern), and 56 km (35 mi) south-east of the regional capital Szczecin (Stettin).

For the history of the region, see History of Pomerania.
