= Białuń, Stargard County =

Białuń
- Village
- Location within Poland
- Coordinates: 53°27′17″N 15°8′42″E
- Country: Poland
- Voivodeship: West Pomeranian
- County: Stargard
- Gmina: Stara Dąbrowa
- Population: 359

Białuń [ˈbjawuɲ] (German: Müggenhall) is a village in the administrative district of Gmina Stara Dąbrowa, within Stargard County, West Pomeranian Voivodeship, in north-western Poland. It lies approximately 4 km (2 mi) north of Stara Dąbrowa, 16 km (10 mi) north-east of Stargard, and 38 km (24 mi) east of the regional capital Szczecin.

The village has a population of 359.
