= Trąbki, West Pomeranian Voivodeship =

Trąbki
- Village
- Location within Poland
- Coordinates: 53°23′56″N 15°14′24″E
- Country: Poland
- Voivodeship: West Pomeranian
- County: Stargard
- Gmina: Marianowo

Trąbki [ˈtrɔmpki] (German: Trampke) is a village in the administrative district of Gmina Marianowo, within Stargard County, West Pomeranian Voivodeship, in north-western Poland. It lies approximately 3 km (2 mi) north-west of Marianowo, 16 km (10 mi) north-east of Stargard, and 44 km (27 mi) east of the regional capital Szczecin.
