= Kolin, West Pomeranian Voivodeship =

Kolin
- Village
- Location within Poland
- Coordinates: 53°14′3″N 15°6′51″E
- Country: Poland
- Voivodeship: West Pomeranian
- County: Stargard
- Gmina: Dolice

Kolin [ˈkɔlin] (German: Kollin) is a village in the administrative district of Gmina Dolice, within Stargard County, West Pomeranian Voivodeship, in north-western Poland. It lies approximately 8 km (5 mi) north-west of Dolice, 13 km (8 mi) south-east of Stargard, and 41 km (25 mi) south-east of the regional capital Szczecin.

== See also ==
History of Pomerania
