= Bielkowo, Stargard County =

Bielkowo
- Village
- Location within Poland
- Coordinates: 53°19′28″N 14°51′19″E
- Country: Poland
- Voivodeship: West Pomeranian
- County: Stargard
- Gmina: Kobylanka
- Population: 253

Bielkowo [bjɛlˈkɔvɔ] (German Belkow) is a village in the administrative district of Gmina Kobylanka, within Stargard County, West Pomeranian Voivodeship, in north-western Poland. It lies approximately 3 km (2 mi) south of Kobylanka, 12 km (7 mi) west of Stargard, and 21 km (13 mi) south-east of the regional capital Szczecin.

For the history of the region, see History of Pomerania.

The village has a population of 253.
