= Tolcz =

- Village
- Location within Poland
- Coordinates: 53°27′N 15°7′E
- Country: Poland
- Voivodeship: West Pomeranian
- County: Stargard
- Gmina: Stara Dąbrowa

Tolcz [tɔlt͡ʂ] (German Tolz) is a village in the administrative district of Gmina Stara Dąbrowa, within Stargard County, West Pomeranian Voivodeship, in north-western Poland. It lies approximately 4 km (2 mi) north-west of Stara Dąbrowa, 15 km (9 mi) north-east of Stargard, and 36 km (22 mi) east of the regional capital Szczecin.
