= Morzyca, Stargard County =

Morzyca
- Village
- Location within Poland
- Coordinates: 53°12′38″N 15°8′52″E
- Country: Poland
- Voivodeship: West Pomeranian
- County: Stargard
- Gmina: Dolice

Morzyca [mɔˈʐɨt͡sa] (formerly German Blumberg) is a village in the administrative district of Gmina Dolice, within Stargard County, West Pomeranian Voivodeship, in north-western Poland. It lies approximately 5 km (3 mi) north-west of Dolice, 16 km (10 mi) south-east of Stargard, and 44 km (27 mi) south-east of the regional capital Szczecin.

For the history of the region, see History of Pomerania.

In Morzyca there is a Catholic church of St. Josemaría Escrivá.
