= Łęczyna =

- Village
- Location within Poland
- Coordinates: 53°26′18″N 15°4′27″E
- Country: Poland
- Voivodeship: West Pomeranian
- County: Stargard
- Gmina: Stara Dąbrowa

Łęczyna [wɛnˈt͡ʂɨna] (German: Lenz Borkenstein) is a village in the administrative district of Gmina Stara Dąbrowa, within Stargard County, West Pomeranian Voivodeship, in north-western Poland. It lies approximately 5 km (3 mi) west of Stara Dąbrowa, 12 km (7 mi) north of Stargard, and 33 km (21 mi) east of the regional capital Szczecin.
