= Ziemomyśl B =

- Village
- Location within Poland
- Coordinates: 53°11′21″N 15°17′50″E
- Country: Poland
- Voivodeship: West Pomeranian
- County: Stargard
- Gmina: Dolice

Ziemomyśl B (German Schönwerder B) is a village in the administrative district of Gmina Dolice, within Stargard County, West Pomeranian Voivodeship, in north-western Poland. It lies approximately 7 km (4 mi) east of Dolice (Dölitz), 24 km (15 mi) south-east of Stargard (Stargard in Pommern), and 54 km (34 mi) south-east of the regional capital Szczecin (Stettin).

For the history of the region, see History of Pomerania.
