= Nowe Kunowo =

- Hamlet
- Location within Poland Location within West Pomeranian Voivodeship
- Coordinates: 53°20′05″N 14°57′41″E
- Country: Poland
- Voivodeship: West Pomeranian
- County: Stargard
- Gmina: Kobylanka
- Time zone: UTC+1 (CET)
  - Summer (DST): UTC+2 (CEST)
- Postal code: 73-108
- Area code: +48 91

Nowe Kunowo (Polish: [ˈnɔ.vɛ kuˈnɔ.vɔ]; lit. 'New Kunowo') is a hamlet in the West Pomeranian Voivodeship, Poland, located within the Gmina Kobylanka, Stargard County.

== History ==
Nowe Kunowo was established on 1 January 2021.
