= Gowienica Miedwiańska =

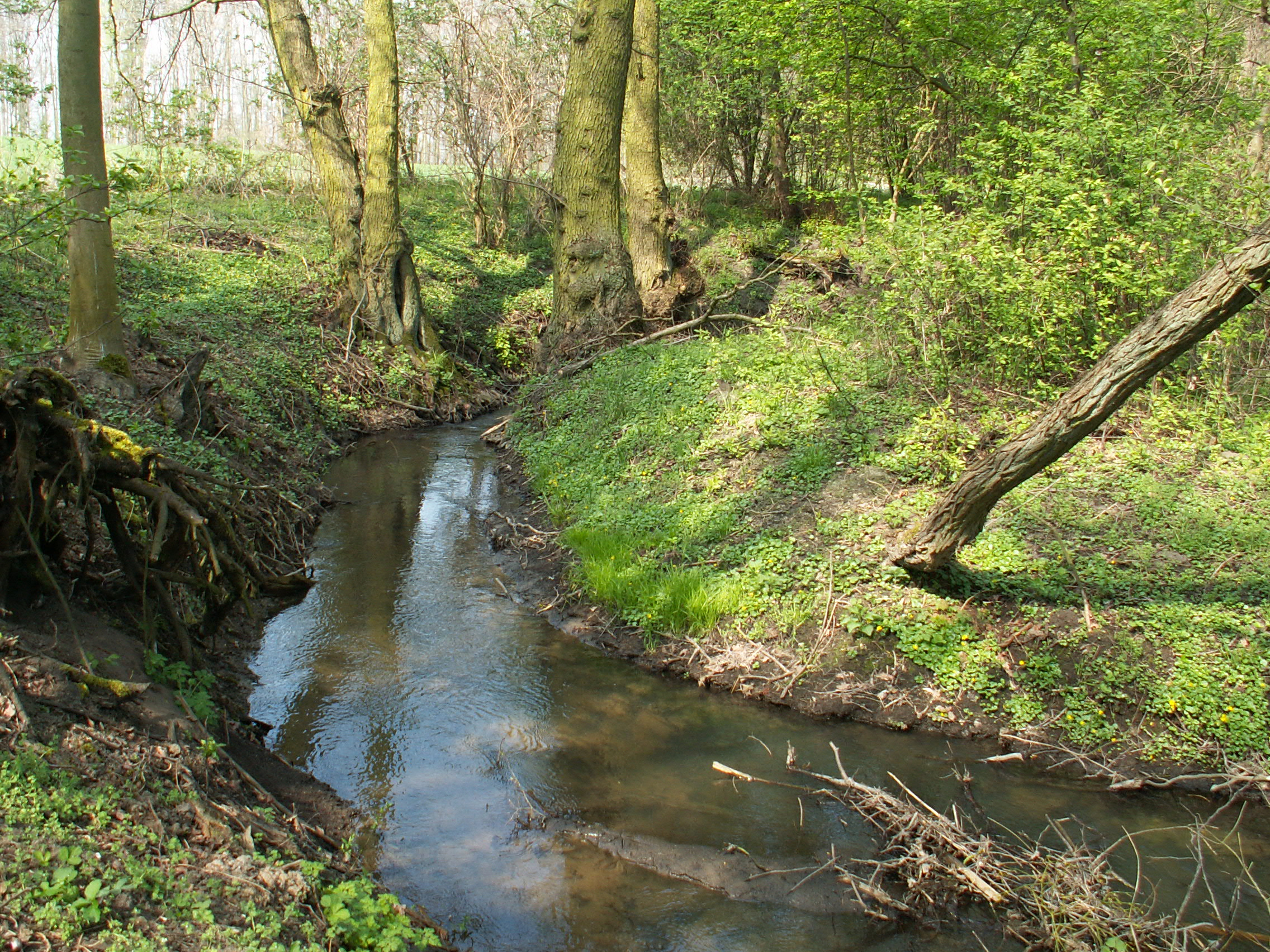
- Gowienica Miedwiańska south of Wierzchląd, near the Miedwie shore

Location
- Country: Poland
- Voivodeship: West Pomeranian

Physical characteristics
- Source
  - location: near Kłęby, Pyrzyce County
  - coordinates: 53°12′58.0″N 15°01′56.0″E
- Mouth: Miedwie
  - location: south of the village of Wierzchląd, Stargard County
  - coordinates: 53.3068°N 14.9107°E
- Length: 15.6 km (9.7 mi)
- Basin size: 59.2 km^{2} (22.9 mi^{2})

Basin features
- Progression: Miedwie→ Płonia→ Oder→ Baltic Sea

Gowienica Miedwiańska is a river of Poland, which flows into the lake Miedwie near Stargard. Miedwie is drained by the Płonia.
