= Luboń (disambiguation) =

Luboń is a town in Greater Poland Voivodeship (west-central Poland).

Luboń may also refer to the following villages:

- Luboń, Pomeranian Voivodeship (north Poland)
- Luboń (hamlet), Pomeranian Voivodeship (north Poland)
- Luboń, West Pomeranian Voivodeship (north-west Poland)
