= Skrzany, West Pomeranian Voivodeship =

Skrzany
- Village
- Location within Poland
- Coordinates: 53°7′45″N 15°13′1″E
- Country: Poland
- Voivodeship: West Pomeranian
- County: Stargard
- Gmina: Dolice

Skrzany [ˈskʂanɨ] (German: Friedrichshof) is a village in the administrative district of Gmina Dolice, within Stargard County, West Pomeranian Voivodeship, in north-western Poland. It lies approximately 7 km (4 mi) south of Dolice, 26 km (16 mi) south-east of Stargard, and 53 km (33 mi) south-east of the regional capital Szczecin.

For the history of the region, see History of Pomerania.
