= Pomietów =

- Village
- Location within Poland
- Coordinates: 53°9′40″N 15°10′48″E
- Country: Poland
- Voivodeship: West Pomeranian
- County: Stargard
- Gmina: Dolice

Pomietów [pɔˈmjɛtuf] (German Pumptow) is a village in the administrative district of Gmina Dolice, within Stargard County, West Pomeranian Voivodeship, in north-western Poland. It lies approximately 4 km (2 mi) south-west of Dolice, 22 km (14 mi) south-east of Stargard, and 49 km (30 mi) south-east of the regional capital Szczecin.

For the history of the region, see History of Pomerania.
