= Łęczówka =

- Settlement
- Location within Poland
- Coordinates: 53°27′6″N 15°4′41″E
- Country: Poland
- Voivodeship: West Pomeranian
- County: Stargard
- Gmina: Stara Dąbrowa

Łęczówka [wɛnˈt͡ʂufka] (German: Lenz B) is a settlement in the administrative district of Gmina Stara Dąbrowa, within Stargard County, West Pomeranian Voivodeship, in north-western Poland. It lies approximately 6 km (4 mi) north-west of Stara Dąbrowa, 14 km (9 mi) north of Stargard, and 34 km (21 mi) east of the regional capital Szczecin.

For the history of the region, see History of Pomerania.
