= Trzebień, Stargard County =

Trzebień
- Village
- Location within Poland
- Coordinates: 53°13′45″N 15°10′49″E
- Country: Poland
- Voivodeship: West Pomeranian
- County: Stargard
- Gmina: Dolice

Trzebień [ˈtʂɛbjɛɲ] (German: Lupoldsruh) is a village in the administrative district of Gmina Dolice, within Stargard County, West Pomeranian Voivodeship, in north-western Poland. It lies approximately 5 km (3 mi) north of Dolice, 16 km (10 mi) south-east of Stargard, and 45 km (28 mi) south-east of the regional capital Szczecin.

For the history of the region, see History of Pomerania.
