= Rokicie, West Pomeranian Voivodeship =

Rokicie
- Village
- Location within Poland
- Coordinates: 53°26′43″N 15°10′43″E
- Country: Poland
- Voivodeship: West Pomeranian
- County: Stargard
- Gmina: Stara Dąbrowa

Rokicie [rɔˈkit͡ɕɛ] (German: Neumühl) is a village in the administrative district of Gmina Stara Dąbrowa, within Stargard County, West Pomeranian Voivodeship, in north-western Poland. It lies approximately 4 km (2 mi) north-east of Stara Dąbrowa, 16 km (10 mi) north-east of Stargard, and 40 km (25 mi) east of the regional capital Szczecin.
