= Kałęga =

- Settlement
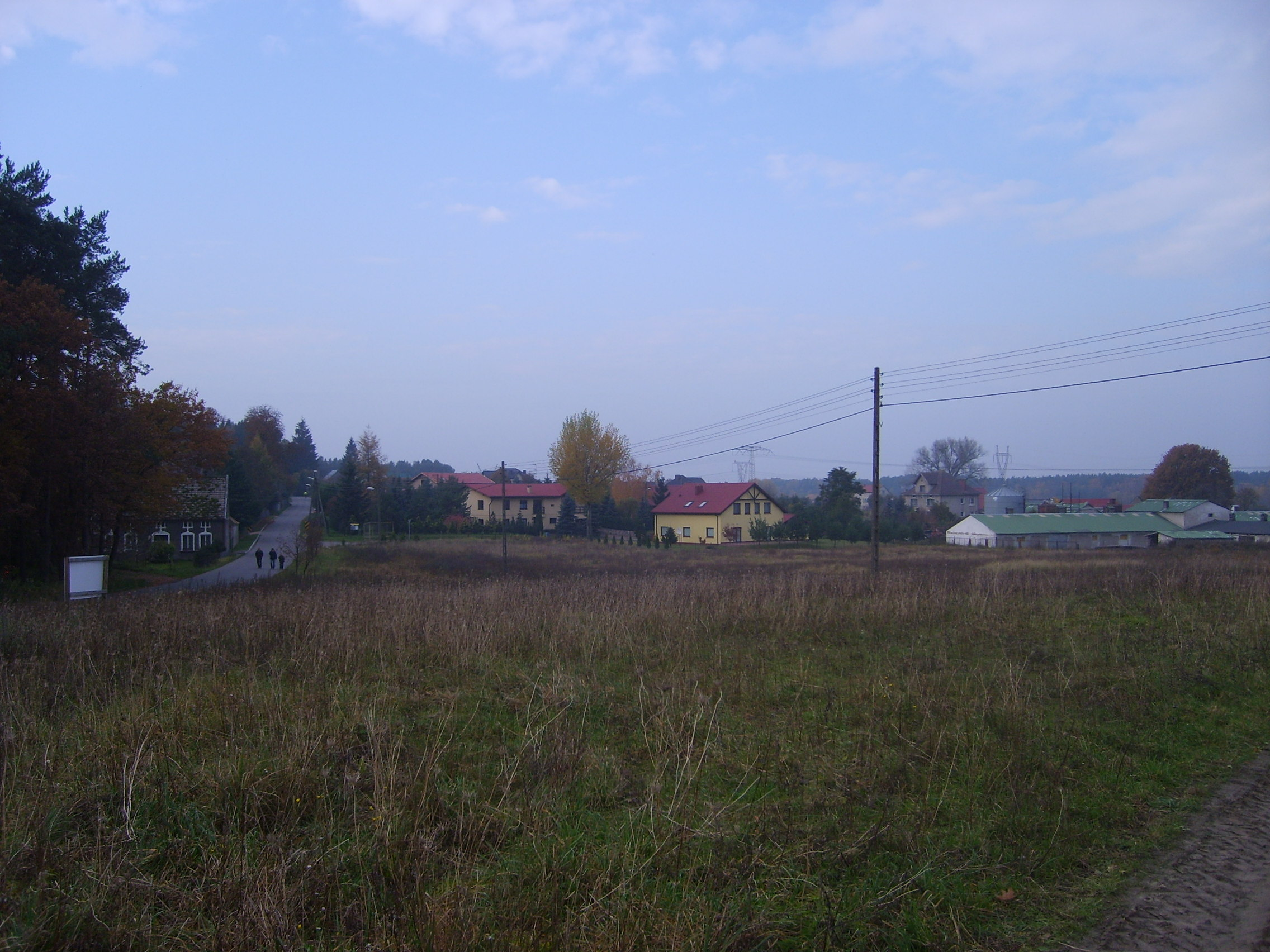
- Skyline from Motaniec

- Location within Poland
- Coordinates: 53°21′24.56″N 14°50′28.19″E
- Country: Poland
- Voivodeship: West Pomeranian
- County: Stargard
- Gmina: Kobylanka
- Population: 22

Kałęga [kaˈwɛnɡa] (German: Kähling) is a settlement in the administrative district of Gmina Kobylanka, within Stargard County, West Pomeranian Voivodeship, in northwestern Poland.

For the history of the region, see History of Pomerania.

The settlement has a population of 22.
