= Kępy, West Pomeranian Voivodeship =

Kępy
- Village
- Location within Poland
- Coordinates: 53°25′24″N 15°12′10″E
- Country: Poland
- Voivodeship: West Pomeranian
- County: Stargard
- Gmina: Marianowo

Kępy [ˈkɛmpɨ] (German: Kempen) is a village in the administrative district of Gmina Marianowo, within Stargard County, West Pomeranian Voivodeship, in north-western Poland. It lies approximately 7 km (4 mi) north-west of Marianowo, 16 km (10 mi) north-east of Stargard, and 42 km (26 mi) east of the regional capital Szczecin.
