= Przewłoki =

- Village
- Location within Poland
- Coordinates: 53°14′58″N 15°5′0″E
- Country: Poland
- Voivodeship: West Pomeranian
- County: Stargard
- Gmina: Dolice

Przewłoki [pʂɛˈvwɔki] (German: Heinrichsthal) is a village in the administrative district of Gmina Dolice, within Stargard County, West Pomeranian Voivodeship, in north-western Poland. It lies approximately 11 km (7 mi) north-west of Dolice, 10 km (6 mi) south of Stargard, and 39 km (24 mi) south-east of the regional capital Szczecin.

For the history of the region, see History of Pomerania.
