= Storkówko =

- Village
- Location within Poland
- Coordinates: 53°25′22″N 15°3′17″E
- Country: Poland
- Voivodeship: West Pomeranian
- County: Stargard
- Gmina: Stara Dąbrowa
- Population: 340

Storkówko [stɔrˈkufkɔ] (German Storkow) is a village in the administrative district of Gmina Stara Dąbrowa, within Stargard County, West Pomeranian Voivodeship, in north-western Poland. It lies approximately 6 km (4 mi) west of Stara Dąbrowa, 11 km (7 mi) north of Stargard, and 32 km (20 mi) east of the regional capital Szczecin.

The village has a population of 340.
