= Kicko, West Pomeranian Voivodeship =

Kicko
- Village
- Location within Poland
- Coordinates: 53°24′6″N 15°6′52″E
- Country: Poland
- Voivodeship: West Pomeranian
- County: Stargard
- Gmina: Stara Dąbrowa

Kicko [ˈkit͡skɔ], (German Kietzig) is a village in the administrative district of Gmina Stara Dąbrowa, within Stargard County, West Pomeranian Voivodeship, in north-western Poland. It lies approximately 4 km (2 mi) south-west of Stara Dąbrowa, 10 km (6 mi) north-east of Stargard, and 36 km (22 mi) east of the regional capital Szczecin.
