= Krępcewo =

- Village
- Location within Poland
- Coordinates: 53°16′N 15°9′E
- Country: Poland
- Voivodeship: West Pomeranian
- County: Stargard
- Gmina: Dolice

Krępcewo [krɛmpˈt͡sɛvɔ] (German Kremzow) is a village in the administrative district of Gmina Dolice, within Stargard County, West Pomeranian Voivodeship, in north-western Poland. It lies approximately 10 km (6 mi) north-west of Dolice, 11 km (7 mi) south-east of Stargard, and 42 km (26 mi) south-east of the regional capital Szczecin.

== See also ==
History of Pomerania
