= Wiechowo =

- Village
- Location within Poland
- Coordinates: 53°22′N 15°18′E
- Country: Poland
- Voivodeship: West Pomeranian
- County: Stargard
- Gmina: Marianowo

Wiechowo [vjɛˈxɔvɔ], (German: Büche) is a village in the administrative district of Gmina Marianowo, within Stargard County, West Pomeranian Voivodeship, in north-western Poland. It lies approximately 3 km (2 mi) south-east of Marianowo, 19 km (12 mi) east of Stargard, and 48 km (30 mi) east of the regional capital Szczecin.
