= Reptowo, West Pomeranian Voivodeship =

Reptowo
- Village
- Location within Poland
- Coordinates: 53°21′N 14°51′E
- Country: Poland
- Voivodeship: West Pomeranian
- County: Stargard
- Gmina: Kobylanka
- Population: 895

Reptowo [rɛpˈtɔvɔ] (German: Karolinenhorst) is a village in the administrative district of Gmina Kobylanka, within Stargard County, West Pomeranian Voivodeship, in north-western Poland. It lies approximately 13 km (8 mi) west of Stargard and 20 km (12 mi) south-east of the regional capital Szczecin.

For the history of the region, see History of Pomerania.

The village has a population of 895.
