= Sowno, Stargard County =

Sowno
- Village
- Location within Poland
- Coordinates: 53°25′35″N 14°54′6″E
- Country: Poland
- Voivodeship: West Pomeranian
- County: Stargard
- Gmina: Stargard
- Population: 463

Sowno [ˈsɔvnɔ] (German Hinzendorf) is a village in the administrative district of Gmina Stargard, within Stargard County, West Pomeranian Voivodeship, in north-western Poland. It lies approximately 14 km (9 mi) north-west of Stargard and 22 km (14 mi) east of the regional capital Szczecin.

For the history of the region, see History of Pomerania.

The village has a population of 463.
