= Morawsko, West Pomeranian Voivodeship =

Morawsko
- Settlement
- Location within Poland
- Coordinates: 53°21′23″N 14°47′42″E
- Country: Poland
- Voivodeship: West Pomeranian
- County: Stargard
- Gmina: Kobylanka
- Population: 7

Morawsko [mɔˈrafskɔ] is a settlement in the administrative district of Gmina Kobylanka, within Stargard County, West Pomeranian Voivodeship, in north-western Poland.

For the history of the region, see History of Pomerania.

The settlement has a population of 7.
