= Trzebiatów, Stargard County =

Trzebiatów
- Village
- Location within Poland
- Coordinates: 53°19′7″N 15°10′46″E
- Country: Poland
- Voivodeship: West Pomeranian
- County: Stargard
- Gmina: Stargard
- Population: 341

Trzebiatów [tʂɛˈbjatuf] (German: Treptow) is a village in the administrative district of Gmina Stargard, within Stargard County, West Pomeranian Voivodeship, in north-western Poland. It lies approximately 10 km (6 mi) east of Stargard and 42 km (26 mi) east of the regional capital Szczecin.

For the history of the region, see History of Pomerania.

The village has a population of 341.
