= Strzyżno =

- Village
- Location within Poland
- Coordinates: 53°16′N 15°2′E
- Country: Poland
- Voivodeship: West Pomeranian
- County: Stargard
- Gmina: Stargard
- Population: 377

Strzyżno [ˈstʂɨʐnɔ] (formerly German: Streesen) is a village in the administrative district of Gmina Stargard, within Stargard County, West Pomeranian Voivodeship, in north-western Poland. It lies approximately 8 km (5 mi) south of Stargard and 35 km (22 mi) south-east of the regional capital Szczecin.

For the history of the region, see History of Pomerania.

The village has a population of 377.
