= Grzędzice =

- Village
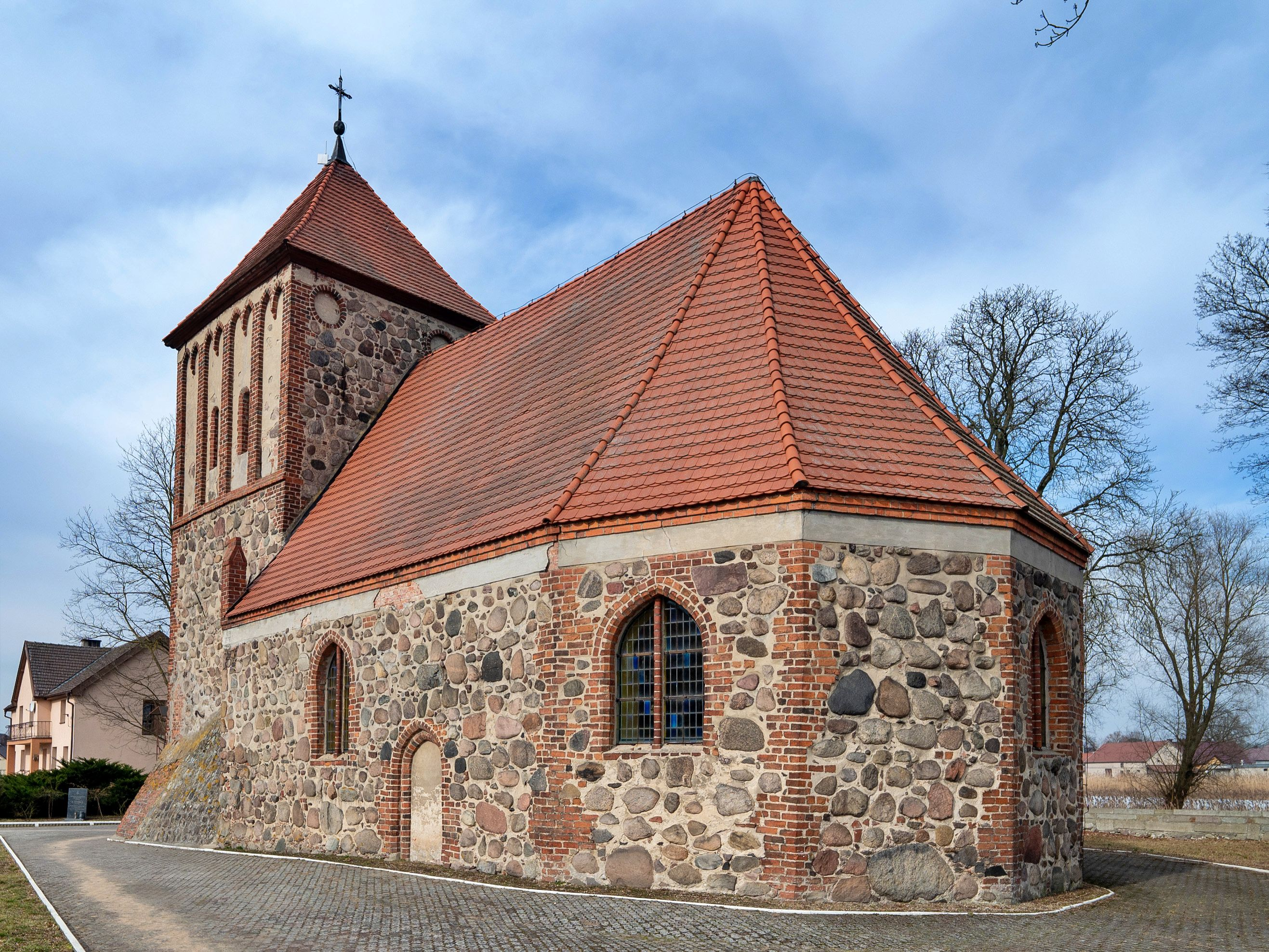
- Church of Saints Peter and Paul in Grzędzice

- Location within Poland
- Coordinates: 53°22′N 14°58′E
- Country: Poland
- Voivodeship: West Pomeranian
- County: Stargard
- Gmina: Stargard

Population
  - Total: 841
- Time zone: UTC+1 (CET)
  - Summer (DST): UTC+2 (CEST)
- Vehicle registration: ZST

Grzędzice [ɡʐɛnˈd͡ʑit͡sɛ] (German: Seefeld) is a village in the administrative district of Gmina Stargard, within Stargard County, West Pomeranian Voivodeship, in north-western Poland. It lies approximately 6 km (4 mi) north-west of Stargard and 27 km (17 mi) east of the regional capital Szczecin.

The village has a population of 841.

== History ==
During World War II, on 5 February 1945, the village was the site of a stopover during the German-organised march of some 6,000 Polish prisoners of war from the Oflag II-D camp headed westwards.
