= Siwkowo =

- Settlement
- Location within Poland
- Coordinates: 53°25′27″N 15°00′12″E
- Country: Poland
- Voivodeship: West Pomeranian
- County: Stargard
- Gmina: Stargard

Siwkowo [ɕifˈkɔvɔ] (German: Heinrichshof) is a settlement in the administrative district of Gmina Stargard, within Stargard County, West Pomeranian Voivodeship, in northwestern Poland.
