= Piaśnik, Stargard County =

Piaśnik
- Village
- Location within Poland
- Coordinates: 53°24′17″N 15°4′40″E
- Country: Poland
- Voivodeship: West Pomeranian
- County: Stargard
- Gmina: Stargard

Piaśnik [ˈpjaɕnik] is a village in the administrative district of Gmina Stargard, within Stargard County, West Pomeranian Voivodeship, in north-western Poland. It lies approximately 9 km (6 mi) north of Stargard and 33 km (21 mi) east of the regional capital Szczecin.

For the history of the region, see History of Pomerania.
