= Mariankowo, West Pomeranian Voivodeship =

Mariankowo
- Settlement
- Location within Poland
- Coordinates: 53°23′54″N 15°17′42″E
- Country: Poland
- Voivodeship: West Pomeranian
- County: Stargard
- Gmina: Marianowo

Mariankowo [marjanˈkɔvɔ] (German: Kolonie Marienfließ) is a settlement in the administrative district of Gmina Marianowo, within Stargard County, West Pomeranian Voivodeship, in north-western Poland.
