= Żalęcino =

- Village
- Location within Poland
- Coordinates: 53°12′N 15°5′E
- Country: Poland
- Voivodeship: West Pomeranian
- County: Stargard
- Gmina: Dolice

Żalęcino [ʐalɛnˈt͡ɕinɔ] (Sallentin in German) is a village in the administrative district of Gmina Dolice, within Stargard County, West Pomeranian Voivodeship, in north-western Poland. It lies approximately 16 km (10 mi) south of Stargard and 42 km (26 mi) south-east of the regional capital Szczecin.

For the history of the region, see History of Pomerania.
