= Brzezina, West Pomeranian Voivodeship =

Brzezina
- Village
- Location within Poland
- Coordinates: 53°6′58″N 15°15′11″E
- Country: Poland
- Voivodeship: West Pomeranian
- County: Stargard
- Gmina: Dolice

Brzezina [bʐɛˈʑina] (German: Falkenberg) is a village in the administrative district of Gmina Dolice, within Stargard County, West Pomeranian Voivodeship, in north-western Poland. It lies approximately 29 km (18 mi) south-east of Stargard and 56 km (35 mi) south-east of the regional capital Szczecin.
