= Płoszkowo, Stargard County =

Płoszkowo
- Village
- Location within Poland
- Coordinates: 53°7′N 15°16′E
- Country: Poland
- Voivodeship: West Pomeranian
- County: Stargard
- Gmina: Dolice
- Population: 150

Płoszkowo [pwɔʂˈkɔvɔ] (German: Ludolphshof) is a village in the administrative district of Gmina Dolice, within Stargard County, West Pomeranian Voivodeship, in north-western Poland. It lies approximately 29 km (18 mi) south-east of Stargard and 57 km (35 mi) south-east of the regional capital Szczecin.

For the history of the region, see History of Pomerania.

The village has a population of 150.
