= Witkowo Drugie =

- Village
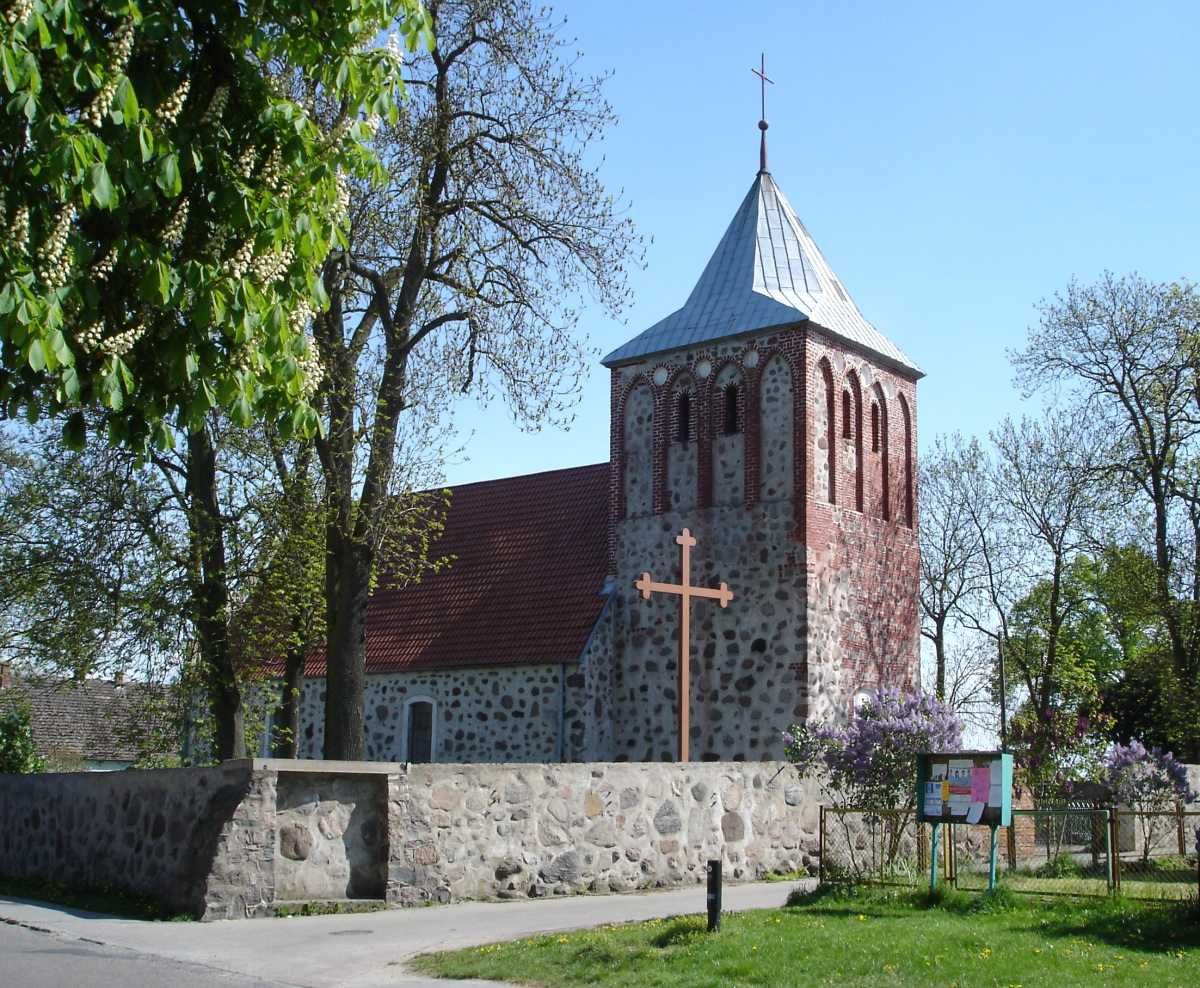
- Our Lady of the Rosary church in Witkowo II

- Location within Poland
- Coordinates: 53°18′N 15°03′E
- Country: Poland
- Voivodeship: West Pomeranian
- County: Stargard
- Gmina: Stargard
- Population: 493

Witkowo Drugie (German: Wittichow bei Stargard, Wittichow (II.)) is a village in the administrative district of Gmina Stargard, within Stargard County, West Pomeranian Voivodeship, in north-western Poland.

For the history of the region, see History of Pomerania.

The village has a population of 493.

== Population development ==
Year	Population	Notes
1817	375	
1865	621	32 of them in Schneidersfelde.
1925	615	In 139 households, of whom 607 were Protestants and 7 were Catholics.
1933	624	
1939	664	
2005	493	
2012	586	
