= Boguszyce, Stargard County =

Boguszyce
- Settlement
- Location within Poland
- Coordinates: 53°09′19″N 15°12′49″E
- Country: Poland
- Voivodeship: West Pomeranian
- County: Stargard
- Gmina: Dolice

Boguszyce [bɔɡuˈʂɨt͡sɛ] (German Burghagen) is a settlement in the administrative district of Gmina Dolice, within Stargard County, West Pomeranian Voivodeship, in north-western Poland.

For the history of the region, see History of Pomerania.
