= Święte, West Pomeranian Voivodeship =

Święte
- Village
- Location within Poland
- Coordinates: 53°19′N 15°5′E
- Country: Poland
- Voivodeship: West Pomeranian
- County: Stargard
- Gmina: Stargard
- Population: 181

Święte (Polish: [ˈɕfjɛntɛ]; German: Schwendt) is a village in the administrative district of Gmina Stargard, within Stargard County, West Pomeranian Voivodeship, in north-western Poland. It lies approximately 4 km (2 mi) south-east of Stargard and 36 km (22 mi) east of the regional capital Szczecin.

For the history of the region, see History of Pomerania.

The village has a population of 181.
