= Załęcze, West Pomeranian Voivodeship =

Załęcze
- Hamlet
- Location within Poland Location within West Pomeranian Voivodeship
- Coordinates: 53°26′13.7″N 15°05′11.5″E
- Country: Poland
- Voivodeship: West Pomeranian
- County: Stargard
- Gmina: Stara Dąbrowa
- Sołectwo: Załęcze
- Time zone: UTC+1 (CET)
  - Summer (DST): UTC+2 (CEST)
- Postal code: 73-112
- Area code: +48 91

Załęcze (Polish: [zaˈwɛn.t͡ʂɛ]) is a hamlet in the West Pomeranian Voivodeship, Poland, located within the Gmina Stara Dąbrowa, Stargard County, in the sołectwo of Załęcze.
