= Lipnik, West Pomeranian Voivodeship =

Lipnik
- Village
- Location within Poland
- Coordinates: 53°20′35″N 14°58′10″E
- Country: Poland
- Voivodeship: West Pomeranian
- County: Stargard
- Gmina: Stargard
- Elevation: 21 m (69 ft)
- Population: 357

Lipnik (Polish: [ˈlipɲik]; German: Lindenberg) is a village in the administrative district of Gmina Stargard, within Stargard County, West Pomeranian Voivodeship, in north-western Poland. It lies approximately 5 km (3 mi) west of Stargard and 27 km (17 mi) east of the regional capital Szczecin.

For the history of the region, see History of Pomerania.

The village has a population of 357.
