= Ulikowo =

- Village
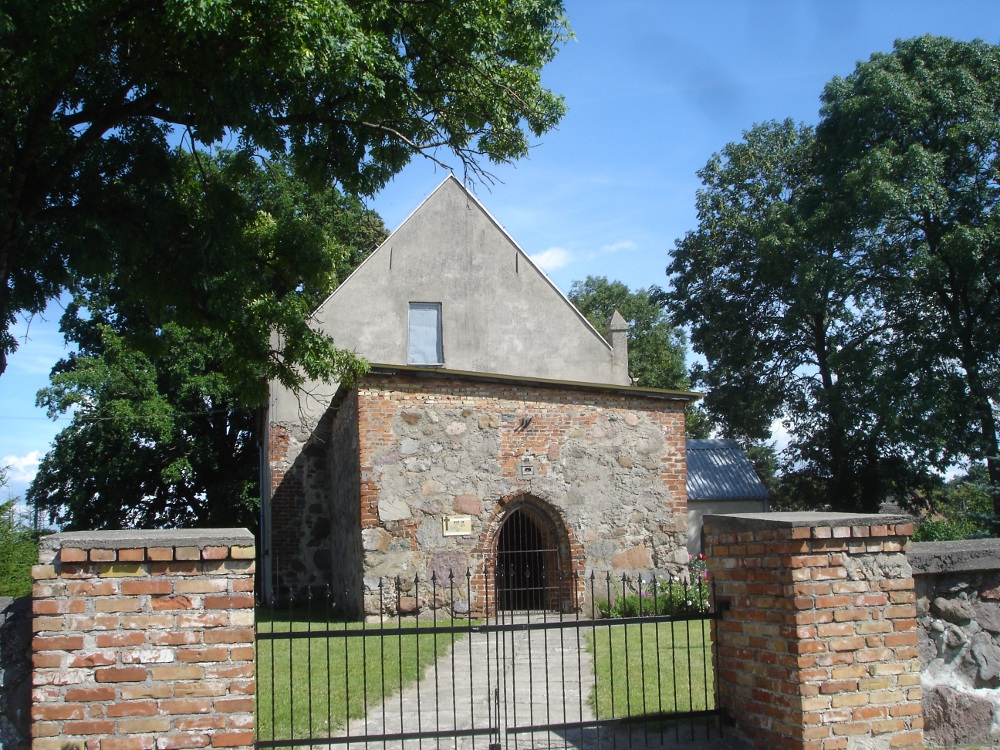
- Church of Saint Isidore

- Location within Poland
- Coordinates: 53°20′N 15°8′E
- Country: Poland
- Voivodeship: West Pomeranian
- County: Stargard
- Gmina: Stargard

Population
  - Total: 564

Ulikowo [uliˈkɔvɔ] (German: Wulkow) is a village in the administrative district of Gmina Stargard, within Stargard County, West Pomeranian Voivodeship, in north-western Poland. It lies approximately 7 km (4 mi) east of Stargard and 38 km (24 mi) east of the regional capital Szczecin.

The village has a population of 564.

== History ==
In the Middle Ages a defensive stronghold was built. From 1229 it was the property of the Hospitallers.

== Notable residents ==
- David Hollatz (1648–1713), Lutheran dogmatician

== See also ==
- History of Pomerania
