= Radziszewo =

Radziszewo may refer to the following places:

- Radziszewo, Warmian-Masurian Voivodeship (north Poland)
- Radziszewo, Goleniów County in West Pomeranian Voivodeship (north-west Poland)
- Radziszewo, Gryfino County in West Pomeranian Voivodeship (north-west Poland)
- Radziszewo, Stargard County in West Pomeranian Voivodeship (north-west Poland)
