= Miedwiecko =

- Settlement
- Location within Poland
- Coordinates: 53°21′52.97″N 14°55′28.16″E
- Country: Poland
- Voivodeship: West Pomeranian
- County: Stargard
- Gmina: Kobylanka
- Population: 26

Miedwiecko (Polish: [mjɛdˈvjɛt͡skɔ]; German: Madüsee) is a settlement in the administrative district of Gmina Kobylanka, within Stargard County, West Pomeranian Voivodeship, in north-western Poland.

For the history of the region, see History of Pomerania.

The settlement has a population of 26.
