= Mężytki =

- Settlement
- Location within Poland
- Coordinates: 53°22′40″N 14°57′40″E
- Country: Poland
- Voivodeship: West Pomeranian
- County: Stargard
- Gmina: Stargard

Mężytki (Polish pronunciation: [mɛ̃ˈʐɨtki]) is a settlement in the administrative district of Gmina Stargard, within Stargard County, West Pomeranian Voivodeship, in north-western Poland.
