= Witkowo Pierwsze =

- Village
- Location within Poland
- Coordinates: 53°17′55″N 15°2′35″E
- Country: Poland
- Voivodeship: West Pomeranian
- County: Stargard
- Gmina: Stargard
- Population: 463

Witkowo Pierwsze (German: Wittichow (I.)) is a village in the administrative district of Gmina Stargard, within Stargard County, West Pomeranian Voivodeship, in north-western Poland. It lies approximately 4 km (2 mi) south of Stargard and 34 km (21 mi) south-east of the regional capital Szczecin. The village has a population of 463.
