= Strachocin =

Strachocin may refer to the following places in Poland:

- Strachocin, Lower Silesian Voivodeship (south-west Poland)
- Strachocin, West Pomeranian Voivodeship (north-west Poland)
