= Motaniec =

- Village
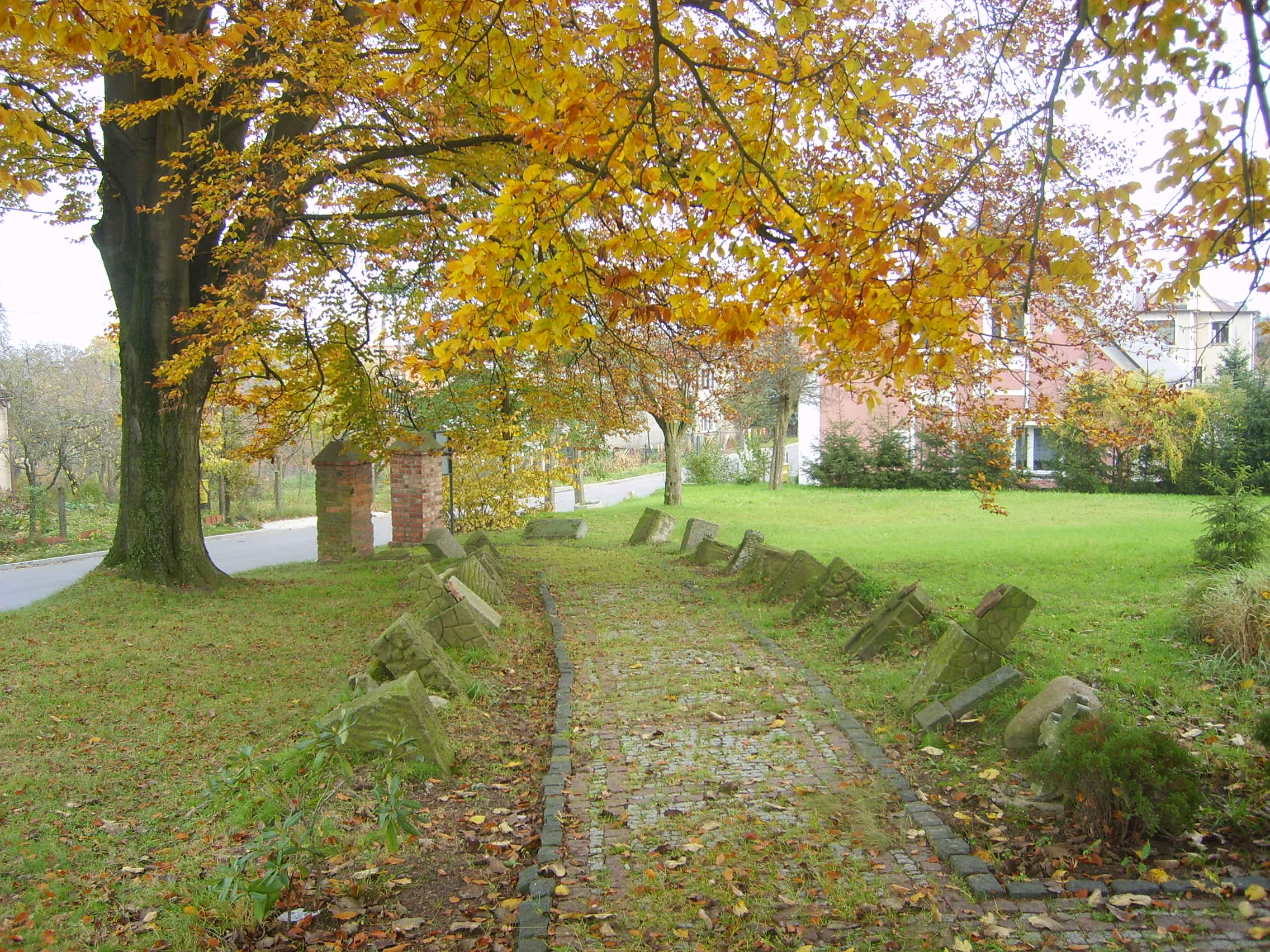
- Lapidarium with old German gravestones in Motaniec

- Location within Poland
- Coordinates: 53°21′21″N 14°51′5″E
- Country: Poland
- Voivodeship: West Pomeranian
- County: Stargard
- Gmina: Kobylanka
- Population: 163
- Website: motaniec.blogspot.com

Motaniec [mɔˈtaɲɛt͡s] (German: Spaldingsfelde) is a village in the administrative district of Gmina Kobylanka, within Stargard County, West Pomeranian Voivodeship, in north-western Poland. It lies approximately 2 km (1 mi) north-west of Kobylanka, 13 km (8 mi) west of Stargard, and 20 km (12 mi) east of the regional capital Szczecin.

For the history of the region, see History of Pomerania.

The village has a population of 163.
