= Trąbki Małe, West Pomeranian Voivodeship =

Trąbki Małe
- Settlement
- Location within Poland
- Coordinates: 53°23′42″N 15°14′14″E
- Country: Poland
- Voivodeship: West Pomeranian
- County: Stargard
- Gmina: Marianowo

Trąbki Małe [ˈtrɔmpki ˈmawɛ] (German: Klein Trampke) is a settlement in the administrative district of Gmina Marianowo, within Stargard County, West Pomeranian Voivodeship, in north-western Poland.
