= Koszewo, West Pomeranian Voivodeship =

Koszewo
- Village
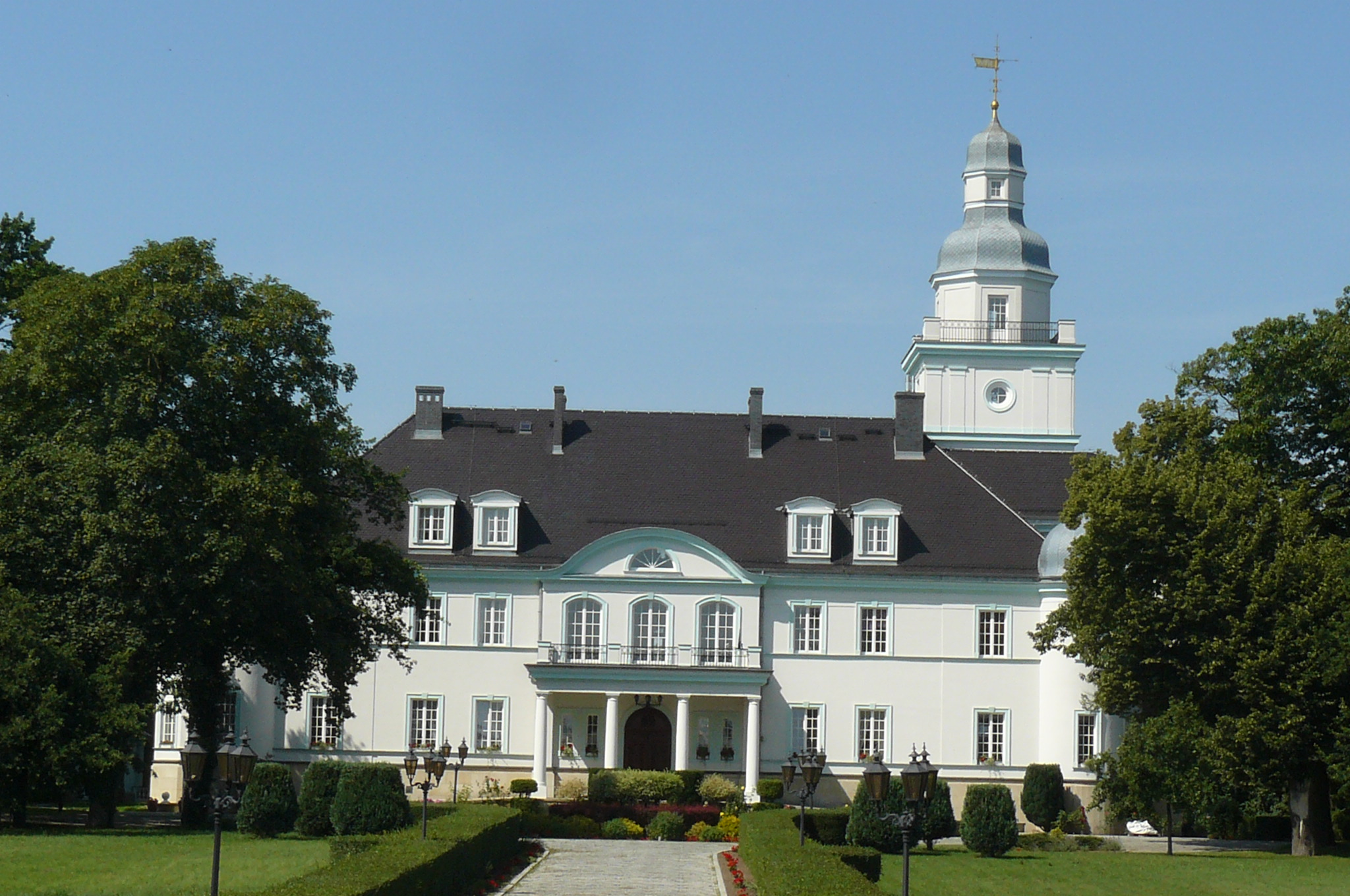
- Koszewo Palace

- Location within Poland
- Coordinates: 53°16′N 14°54′E
- Country: Poland
- Voivodeship: West Pomeranian
- County: Stargard
- Gmina: Stargard

Population
  - Total: 438
- Time zone: UTC+1 (CET)
  - Summer (DST): UTC+2 (CEST)
- Vehicle registration: ZST

Koszewo [kɔˈʂɛvɔ] is a village in the administrative district of Gmina Stargard, within Stargard County, West Pomeranian Voivodeship, in north-western Poland. It lies approximately 12 km (7 mi) south-west of Stargard and 27 km (17 mi) south-east of the regional capital Szczecin. The village has a population of 438.

It is situated on the eastern shore of Miedwie Lake.
