= Sułkowo, Stargard County =

Sułkowo
- Settlement
- Location within Poland
- Coordinates: 53°19′47″N 15°8′29″E
- Country: Poland
- Voivodeship: West Pomeranian
- County: Stargard
- Gmina: Stargard

Sułkowo [suu̯ˈkɔvɔ] (German: Karolinenthal) is a settlement in the administrative district of Gmina Stargard, within Stargard County, West Pomeranian Voivodeship, in north-western Poland. It lies approximately 8 km (5 mi) east of Stargard and 39 km (24 mi) east of the regional capital Szczecin.

For the history of the region, see History of Pomerania.
