= Kolonia Górna Grabowo =

- Settlement
- Location within Poland
- Coordinates: 53°24′15″N 15°4′37″E
- Country: Poland
- Voivodeship: West Pomeranian
- County: Stargard
- Gmina: Stargard
- Elevation: 56 m (184 ft)
- Population: 47

Kolonia Górna Grabowo [kɔˈlɔɲa ˈɡurna ɡraˈbɔvɔ] (German: Vorwerk Neuhof) is a settlement in the administrative district of Gmina Stargard, within Stargard County, West Pomeranian Voivodeship, in north-western Poland. It lies approximately 9 km (6 mi) north of Stargard and 33 km (21 mi) east of the regional capital Szczecin.

For the history of the region, see History of Pomerania.

The settlement has a population of 47.
