= Golczewo, Stargard County =

Golczewo
- Village
- Location within Poland
- Coordinates: 53°18′27″N 14°58′31″E
- Country: Poland
- Voivodeship: West Pomeranian
- County: Stargard
- Gmina: Stargard
- Population: 23

Golczewo [ɡɔlˈt͡ʂɛvɔ] (German: Goltzow) is a village in the administrative district of Gmina Stargard, within Stargard County, West Pomeranian Voivodeship, in north-western Poland.

The village has a population of 23.
