= Kępinka, West Pomeranian Voivodeship =

Kępinka
- Colony
- Location within Poland
- Coordinates: 53°25′17″N 14°52′58″E
- Country: Poland
- Voivodeship: West Pomeranian
- County: Stargard
- Gmina: Stargard

Kępinka [kɛmˈpinka] is a colony in the administrative district of Gmina Stargard, within Stargard County, West Pomeranian Voivodeship, in north-western Poland. It lies approximately 14 km (9 mi) north-west of Stargard and 20 km (12 mi) east of the regional capital Szczecin.

For the history of the region, see History of Pomerania.
