= Grzędziczki =

- Settlement
- Location within Poland
- Coordinates: 53°21′34″N 14°58′21″E
- Country: Poland
- Voivodeship: West Pomeranian
- County: Stargard
- Gmina: Stargard

Grzędziczki [ɡʐɛnˈd͡ʑit͡ʂki] (German: Steineck) is a settlement in the administrative district of Gmina Stargard, within Stargard County, West Pomeranian Voivodeship, in north-western Poland.

For the history of the region, see History of Pomerania.

== Name ==
The settlement was historically known by its German name Steineck before 1945. After the end of World War II and the subsequent border changes in Central and Eastern Europe, the area was incorporated into Poland, and the current Polish name Grzędziczki was adopted as part of a policy to standardize geographical names and rename places in accordance with the Polish language and administration.
