= Lubowo, Stargard County =

Lubowo
- Village
- Location within Poland
- Coordinates: 53°22′59″N 15°0′27″E
- Country: Poland
- Voivodeship: West Pomeranian
- County: Stargard
- Gmina: Stargard
- Population: 127

Lubowo [luˈbɔvɔ] (German: Lübow) is a village in the administrative district of Gmina Stargard, within Stargard County, West Pomeranian Voivodeship, in north-western Poland. It lies approximately 6 km (4 mi) north of Stargard and 29 km (18 mi) east of the regional capital Szczecin.

For the history of the region, see History of Pomerania.

The village has a population of 127.
