= Golinka, West Pomeranian Voivodeship =

Golinka
- Settlement
- Location within Poland
- Coordinates: 53°19′51″N 15°16′34″E
- Country: Poland
- Voivodeship: West Pomeranian
- County: Stargard
- Gmina: Stargard

Golinka [ɡɔˈlinka] (German: Neu Gollin) is a settlement in the administrative district of Gmina Stargard, within Stargard County, West Pomeranian Voivodeship, in north-western Poland.

== See also ==
History of Pomerania
