= Kurcewo =

- Village
- Location within Poland
- Coordinates: 53°15′37″N 15°3′20″E
- Country: Poland
- Voivodeship: West Pomeranian
- County: Stargard
- Gmina: Stargard
- Elevation: 28 m (92 ft)
- Population: 128

Kurcewo [kurˈt͡sɛvɔ] (German: Krüssow) is a village in the administrative district of Gmina Stargard, within Stargard County, West Pomeranian Voivodeship, in north-western Poland. It lies approximately 9 km (6 mi) south of Stargard and 36 km (22 mi) south-east of the regional capital Szczecin.

For the history of the region, see History of Pomerania.

The village has a population of 128.
