= Warchlino =

- Village
- Location within Poland
- Coordinates: 53°26′29″N 14°58′59″E
- Country: Poland
- Voivodeship: West Pomeranian
- County: Stargard
- Gmina: Stargard

Population
  - Total: 85
- Time zone: UTC+01:00 (CET)
  - Summer (DST): UTC+02:00 (CEST)

Warchlino [varˈxlinɔ] (German Groß Wachlin) is a village in the administrative district of Gmina Stargard, within Stargard County, West Pomeranian Voivodeship, in north-western Poland.

For the history of the region, see History of Pomerania.

The village has a population of 85.
