= Skalin, Stargard County =

Skalin
- Village
- Location within Poland
- Coordinates: 53°18′47″N 14°56′22″E
- Country: Poland
- Voivodeship: West Pomeranian
- County: Stargard
- Gmina: Stargard
- Population: 485

Skalin [ˈskalin] (German Schellin) is a village in the administrative district of Gmina Stargard, within Stargard County, West Pomeranian Voivodeship, in north-western Poland. It lies approximately 7 km (4 mi) west of Stargard and 27 km (17 mi) south-east of the regional capital Szczecin.

The village has a population of 485.
