= Warchlinko =

- Village
- Location within Poland
- Coordinates: 53°26′N 14°59′E
- Country: Poland
- Voivodeship: West Pomeranian
- County: Stargard
- Gmina: Stargard

Warchlinko [varˈxlinkɔ] (formerly German Klein Wachlin) is a village in the administrative district of Gmina Stargard, within Stargard County, West Pomeranian Voivodeship, in north-western Poland. It lies approximately 12 km (7 mi) north of Stargard and 27 km (17 mi) east of the regional capital Szczecin.

For the history of the region, see History of Pomerania.
