= Strzebielewo =

- Village
- Location within Poland
- Coordinates: 53°15′N 15°5′E
- Country: Poland
- Voivodeship: West Pomeranian
- County: Stargard
- Gmina: Dolice

Strzebielewo [stʂɛbjɛˈlɛvɔ] (formerly German Strebelow) is a village in the administrative district of Gmina Dolice, within Stargard County, West Pomeranian Voivodeship, in north-western Poland. It lies approximately 10 km (6 mi) south of Stargard and 39 km (24 mi) south-east of the regional capital Szczecin.

For the history of the region, see History of Pomerania.
