= Mogilica, West Pomeranian Voivodeship =

Mogilica
- Village
- Location within Poland
- Coordinates: 53°11′54″N 15°15′33″E
- Country: Poland
- Voivodeship: West Pomeranian
- County: Stargard
- Gmina: Dolice

Mogilica [mɔɡiˈlit͡sa] (German Neuhof) is a village in the administrative district of Gmina Dolice, within Stargard County, West Pomeranian Voivodeship, in north-western Poland. It lies approximately 4 km (2 mi) east of Dolice, 22 km (14 mi) south-east of Stargard, and 52 km (32 mi) south-east of the regional capital Szczecin.
