= Zieleniewo, Stargard County =

Zieleniewo
- Village
- Location within Poland
- Coordinates: 53°22′N 14°56′E
- Country: Poland
- Voivodeship: West Pomeranian
- County: Stargard
- Gmina: Kobylanka
- Population: 291

Zieleniewo [ʑɛlɛˈɲɛvɔ] (German Grünhof) is a village in the administrative district of Gmina Kobylanka, within Stargard County, West Pomeranian Voivodeship, in north-western Poland. It lies approximately 8 km (5 mi) north-west of Stargard and 24 km (15 mi) east of the regional capital Szczecin.

The village has a population of 291.
