= Małkocin =

- Village
- Location within Poland
- Coordinates: 53°24′N 15°1′E
- Country: Poland
- Voivodeship: West Pomeranian
- County: Stargard
- Gmina: Stargard
- Elevation: 32 m (105 ft)
- Population: 472

Małkocin [mau̯ˈkɔt͡ɕin] (German Mulkenthin) is a village in the administrative district of Gmina Stargard, within Stargard County, West Pomeranian Voivodeship, in north-western Poland. It lies approximately 8 km (5 mi) north of Stargard and 29 km (18 mi) east of the regional capital Szczecin.

For the history of the region, see History of Pomerania.

The village has a population of 472.
