= Cisewo =

- Village
- Location within Poland
- Coordinates: 53°23′N 14°54′E
- Country: Poland
- Voivodeship: West Pomeranian
- County: Stargard
- Gmina: Kobylanka
- Population: 135

Cisewo [t͡ɕiˈsɛvɔ] (German Zimmermannshorst) is a village in the administrative district of Gmina Kobylanka, within Stargard County, West Pomeranian Voivodeship, in north-western Poland. It lies approximately 11 km (7 mi) north-west of Stargard and 22 km (14 mi) east of the regional capital Szczecin.

For the history of the region, see History of Pomerania.

The village has a population of 135.
