= Omięcin, West Pomeranian Voivodeship =

Omięcin
- Settlement
- Location within Poland
- Coordinates: 53°21′25″N 15°10′07″E
- Country: Poland
- Voivodeship: West Pomeranian
- County: Stargard
- Gmina: Stargard

Omięcin [ɔˈmjɛnt͡ɕin] is a settlement in the administrative district of Gmina Stargard, within Stargard County, West Pomeranian Voivodeship, in north-western Poland.

For the history of the region, see History of Pomerania.
