= Komorowo, Stargard County =

Komorowo
- Settlement
- Location within Poland
- Coordinates: 53°10′50″N 15°14′02″E
- Country: Poland
- Voivodeship: West Pomeranian
- County: Stargard
- Gmina: Dolice

Komorowo [kɔmɔˈrɔvɔ] (German: Bullenwerder) is a settlement in the administrative district of Gmina Dolice, within Stargard County, West Pomeranian Voivodeship, in north-western Poland.
