= Smogolice =

- Village
- Location within Poland
- Coordinates: 53°24′N 14°57′E
- Country: Poland
- Voivodeship: West Pomeranian
- County: Stargard
- Gmina: Stargard
- Population: 87

Smogolice [smɔɡɔˈlit͡sɛ] (German: Bruchhausen) is a village in the administrative district of Gmina Stargard, within Stargard County, West Pomeranian Voivodeship, in north-western Poland. It lies approximately 10 km (6 mi) north-west of Stargard and 25 km (16 mi) east of the regional capital Szczecin.

The village has a population of 87.
