= Dobropole Pyrzyckie =

- Village
- Location within Poland
- Coordinates: 53°8′N 15°14′E
- Country: Poland
- Voivodeship: West Pomeranian
- County: Stargard
- Gmina: Dolice

Dobropole Pyrzyckie [dɔbrɔˈpɔlɛ pɨˈʐɨt͡skʲɛ] (German: Dobberphul) is a village in the administrative district of Gmina Dolice, within Stargard County, West Pomeranian Voivodeship, in north-western Poland. It lies approximately 26 km (16 mi) south-east of Stargard and 54 km (34 mi) south-east of the regional capital Szczecin.
