= Mogilica =

Mogilica may refer to:

- Mogilica (river), a river of Poland
- Mogilica, West Pomeranian Voivodeship, a village in Poland
- Mogilica or Mogilitsa, a village in Bulgaria
