= Jęczydół =

- Village
- Location within Poland
- Coordinates: 53°21′7″N 14°53′36″E
- Country: Poland
- Voivodeship: West Pomeranian
- County: Stargard
- Gmina: Kobylanka
- Population: 145

Jęczydół [jɛnˈt͡ʂɨduu̯] (German: Brenkenhofswalde) is a village in the administrative district of Gmina Kobylanka, within Stargard County, West Pomeranian Voivodeship, in north-western Poland. It lies approximately 10 km (6 mi) west of Stargard and 22 km (14 mi) east of the regional capital Szczecin.

The village has a population of 145 people.
