= Friedrich Wilhelm von Dossow =

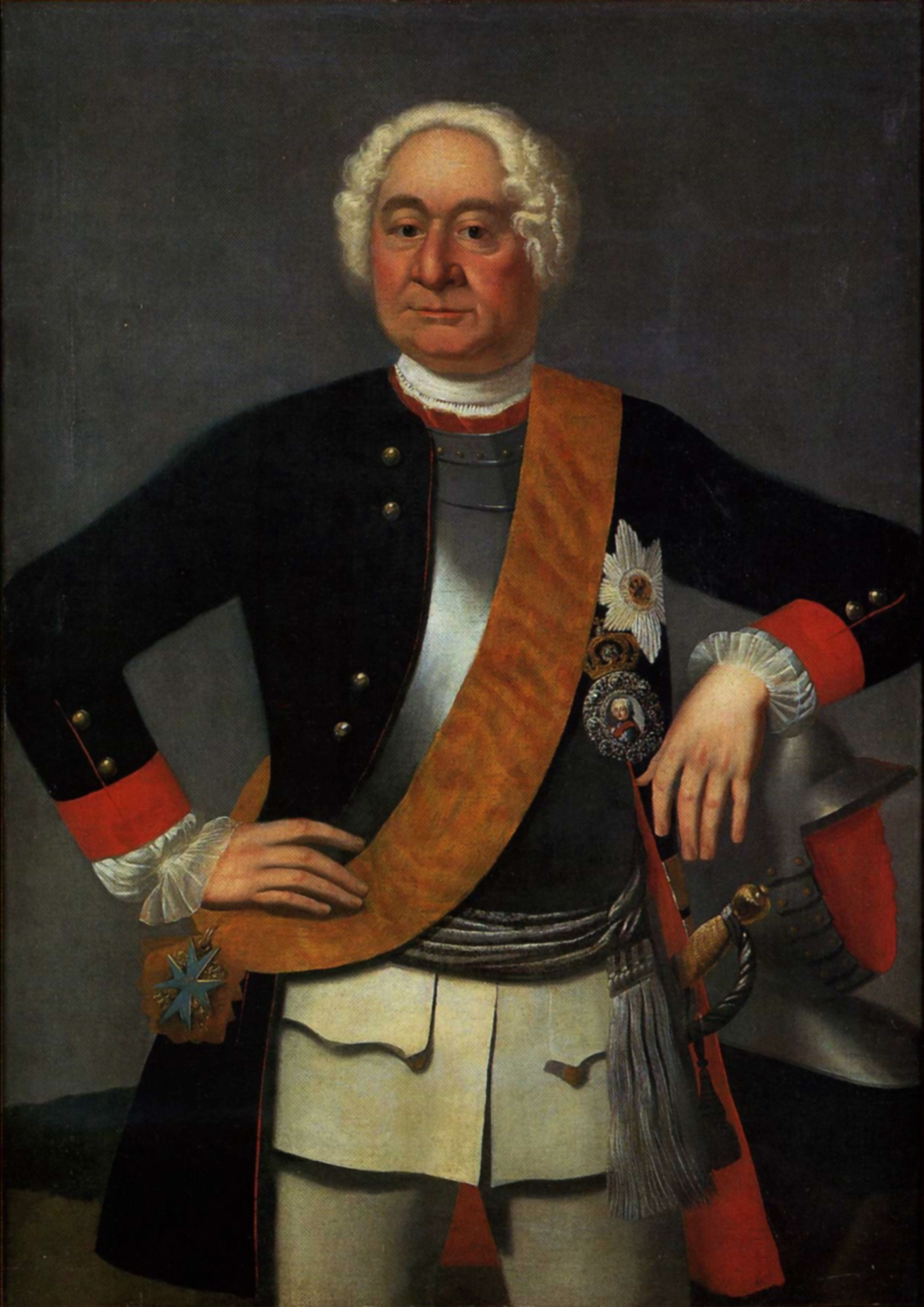
Friedrich Wilhelm von Dossow

Friedrich Wilhelm von Dossow (17 December 1669 – 28 March 1758) was a Prussian Generalfeldmarschall and Governor of Wesel.

== Family ==
Friedrich Wilhelm was a member of the von Dossow family (also Dossau and Dossen), old Pomeranian nobility first mentioned in 1330. The family's main possession was Cunow near Stettin and Greifenhagen. Friedrich Wilhelm was the son of the district president, Richard Thomas von Dossow.

Dossow was married three times, although he did not have any children. Concerned about the welfare of soldiers' children, he opened free schools for them out of his own means.

== Military career ==
Dossow was educated at the Joachimsthalsches Gymnasium in Berlin; in 1688 he participated in the burial of Frederick William, the "Great Elector". After attending the military college in Kolberg, Dossow joined Prince Alexander of Courland's regiment in the Duchy of Prussia. After the regiment was strengthened with a detachment of troops from the Margraviate of Brandenburg, it became known as the 'Regiment Kurland'. King Frederick I of Prussia placed the regiment under the command of Emperor Leopold I during the War of the Spanish Succession.

Dossow participated in Hungary against the Ottoman Turks and against France in the Rhineland. When King Frederick William I began his campaign to conquer Pomerania from Sweden in 1715, Dossow held the rank of Major. Later that year, Dossow was the Generaladjutant to Leopold I of Anhalt-Dessau during the capture of Rügen and siege of Stralsund.

Frederick William and Leopold, the "Old Dessauer", entrusted Dossow with the creation and training of new regiments during an expansion of the Prussian Army. Dossow was steadily promoted through the ranks: Oberst in 1728, Generalmajor and commander in 1733, and Acting Governor of Wesel in the Duchy of Cleves in 1739. During a visit to the duchy, King Frederick II promoted Dossow to Generalleutnant.

Dossow remained in Wesel to protect the city during the First and Second Silesian Wars. In 1742 he formally became Governor of Wesel and was awarded the Order of the Black Eagle. After the Battle of Hohenfriedberg, Frederick promoted Dossow to Generalfeldmarschal on 20 July 1745. As a special recognition for Dossow's service, in 1751 Frederick the Great awarded him a diamond-covered portrait of the king on a blue band. Dossow, Wilhelm Dietrich von Buddenbrock, and Hans von Lehwaldt were the only recipients of the special award.

When the Seven Years' War began, Dossow did not participate on account of his advanced age. In January 1757 he retired to his estate of Gut Busekow, where he died the following year.
