= Domanowo, West Pomeranian Voivodeship =

Domanowo
- Settlement
- Location within Poland
- Coordinates: 53°22′1″N 15°10′23″E
- Country: Poland
- Voivodeship: West Pomeranian
- County: Stargard
- Gmina: Stargard

Domanowo [dɔmaˈnɔvɔ] (German: Friederikenhof) is a settlement in the administrative district of Gmina Stargard, within Stargard County, West Pomeranian Voivodeship, in north-western Poland. It lies approximately 10 km (6 mi) east of Stargard and 40 km (25 mi) east of the regional capital Szczecin.

For the history of the region, see History of Pomerania.
