= Rzeplino =

- Village
- Location within Poland
- Coordinates: 53°15′N 15°11′E
- Country: Poland
- Voivodeship: West Pomeranian
- County: Stargard
- Gmina: Dolice
- Population: 610

Rzeplino [ʐɛˈplinɔ] (formerly German Repplin) is a village in the administrative district of Gmina Dolice, within Stargard County, West Pomeranian Voivodeship, in north-western Poland. It lies approximately 14 km (9 mi) south-east of Stargard and 44 km (27 mi) south-east of the regional capital Szczecin.

For the history of the region, see History of Pomerania.

The village has a population of 610.
