= Bębnikąt, Stargard County =

Bębnikąt
- Settlement
- Location within Poland
- Coordinates: 53°19′31″N 15°8′1″E
- Country: Poland
- Voivodeship: West Pomeranian
- County: Stargard
- Gmina: Stargard

Bębnikąt [bɛmbˈnikɔnt] is a settlement in the administrative district of Gmina Stargard, within Stargard County, West Pomeranian Voivodeship, in north-western Poland. It lies approximately 7 km (4 mi) east of Stargard and 38 km (24 mi) east of the regional capital Szczecin.

== See also ==
History of Pomerania
