= Podlesie, Stargard County =

Podlesie
- Village
- Location within Poland
- Coordinates: 53°25′7″N 14°54′24″E
- Country: Poland
- Voivodeship: West Pomeranian
- County: Stargard
- Gmina: Stargard

Podlesie [pɔdˈlɛɕɛ] (German: Friedrichswalde) is a village in the administrative district of Gmina Stargard, within Stargard County, West Pomeranian Voivodeship, in north-western Poland. It lies approximately 13 km (8 mi) north-west of Stargard and 22 km (14 mi) east of the regional capital Szczecin.

For the history of the region, see History of Pomerania.
