= Rogowo, Stargard County =

Rogowo
- Village
- Location within Poland
- Coordinates: 53°24′N 14°59′E
- Country: Poland
- Voivodeship: West Pomeranian
- County: Stargard
- Gmina: Stargard
- Population: 149
- Time zone: UTC+1 (CET)
  - Summer (DST): UTC+2 (CEST)
- Vehicle registration: ZST

Rogowo [rɔˈɡɔvɔ] (German Roggow) is a village in the administrative district of Gmina Stargard, within Stargard County, West Pomeranian Voivodeship, in north-western Poland. It lies approximately 9 km (6 mi) north-west of Stargard and 27 km (17 mi) east of the regional capital Szczecin.

The village has a population of 149.

== Sports ==
The local football club is Dęby Rogowo. It competes in the lower leagues.
