= Kunowo =

Kunowo may refer to the following places:

- Kunowo, Gostyń County in Greater Poland Voivodeship (west-central Poland)
- Kunowo, Piła County in Greater Poland Voivodeship (west-central Poland)
- Kunowo, Kuyavian-Pomeranian Voivodeship (north-central Poland)
- Kunowo, Słupca County in Greater Poland Voivodeship (west-central Poland)
- Kunowo, Szamotuły County in Greater Poland Voivodeship (west-central Poland)
- Kunowo, Gryfino County in West Pomeranian Voivodeship (north-west Poland)
- Kunowo, Stargard County in West Pomeranian Voivodeship (north-west Poland)
- Kunowo, Świdwin County in West Pomeranian Voivodeship (north-west Poland)
- Nowe Kunowo in Stargard County, West Pomeranian Voivodeship (north-west Poland)
