= Kolonia Dolna-Grabowo =

- Settlement
- Location within Poland
- Coordinates: 53°22′18″N 15°4′23″E
- Country: Poland
- Voivodeship: West Pomeranian
- County: Stargard
- Gmina: Stargard

Kolonia Dolna-Grabowo [kɔˈlɔɲa ˈdɔlna ɡraˈbɔvɔ] is a settlement in the administrative district of Gmina Stargard, within Stargard County, West Pomeranian Voivodeship, in north-western Poland. It lies approximately 6 km (4 mi) north-east of Stargard and 33 km (21 mi) east of the regional capital Szczecin.

For the history of the region, see History of Pomerania.
