= Zagość, West Pomeranian Voivodeship =

Nowa Zagość
- Settlement
- Location within Poland
- Coordinates: 53°21′04″N 14°56′07″E
- Country: Poland
- Voivodeship: West Pomeranian
- County: Stargard
- Gmina: Kobylanka
- Population: 14

Zagość [ˈzaɡɔɕt͡ɕ] (German: Krug) is a settlement in the administrative district of Gmina Kobylanka, within Stargard County, West Pomeranian Voivodeship, in north-western Poland.

The settlement has a population of 14.

== See also ==
- History of Pomerania
