= Tychowo (disambiguation) =

Tychowo is a town in Białogard County, north-west Poland.

Tychowo may also refer to the following villages:

- Tychowo, Sławno County
- Tychowo, Stargard County
