= Poczernin, West Pomeranian Voivodeship =

Poczernin
- Village
- Location within Poland
- Coordinates: 53°25′N 14°57′E
- Country: Poland
- Voivodeship: West Pomeranian
- County: Stargard
- Gmina: Stargard
- Population: 228

Poczernin [pɔˈt͡ʂɛrnin] (German Pützerlin) is a village in the administrative district of Gmina Stargard, within Stargard County, West Pomeranian Voivodeship, in north-western Poland. It lies approximately 11 km (7 mi) north-west of Stargard and 25 km (16 mi) east of the regional capital Szczecin.

For the history of the region, see History of Pomerania.
