= Strumiany, West Pomeranian Voivodeship =

Strumiany
- Village
- Location within Poland
- Coordinates: 53°26′N 14°53′E
- Country: Poland
- Voivodeship: West Pomeranian
- County: Stargard
- Gmina: Stargard
- Population: 64

Strumiany [struˈmjanɨ] (German: Karlsbach) is a village in the administrative district of Gmina Stargard, within Stargard County, West Pomeranian Voivodeship, in north-western Poland. It lies approximately 15 km (9 mi) north-west of Stargard and 20 km (12 mi) east of the regional capital Szczecin.

For the history of the region, see History of Pomerania.

The village has a population of 64.
