= Żarowo, West Pomeranian Voivodeship =

Żarowo
- Village
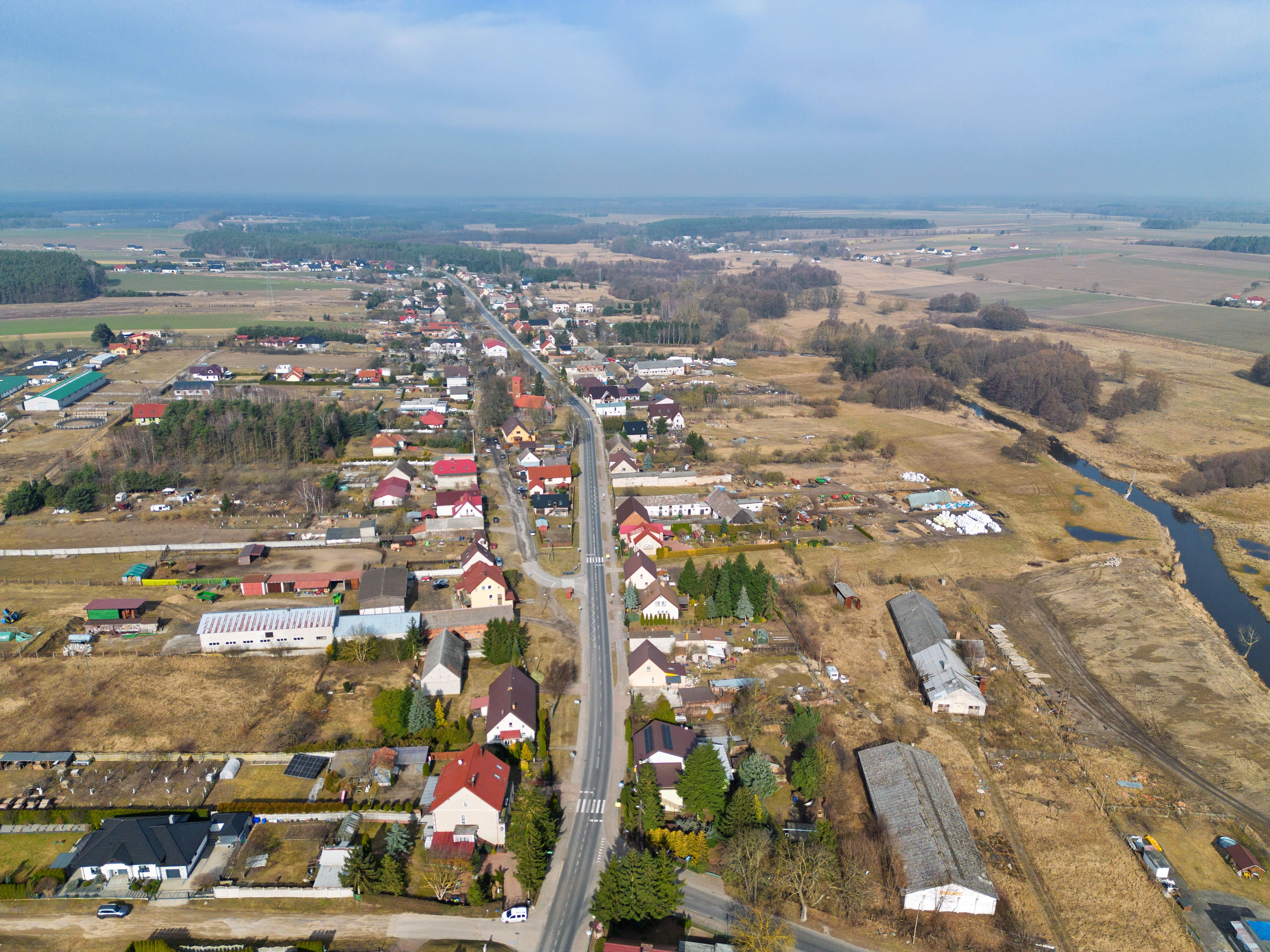
- Aerial view of Żarowo

- Location within Poland
- Coordinates: 53°23′4″N 14°59′32″E
- Country: Poland
- Voivodeship: West Pomeranian
- County: Stargard
- Gmina: Stargard
- Population: 349
- Time zone: UTC+1 (CET)
  - Summer (DST): UTC+2 (CEST)
- Vehicle registration: ZST

Żarowo [ʐaˈrɔvɔ] (German: Saarow) is a village in the administrative district of Gmina Stargard, within Stargard County, West Pomeranian Voivodeship, in north-western Poland. It lies approximately 7 km (4 mi) north-west of Stargard and 28 km (17 mi) east of the regional capital Szczecin.

The village has a population of 349.
