= Wierzchląd =

- Village
- Location within Poland
- Coordinates: 53°18′38″N 14°54′59″E
- Country: Poland
- Voivodeship: West Pomeranian
- County: Stargard
- Gmina: Stargard
- Population: 99

Wierzchląd [ˈvjɛʂxlɔnt] (German: Verchland) is a village in the administrative district of Gmina Stargard, within Stargard County, West Pomeranian Voivodeship, in north-western Poland.

For the history of the region, see History of Pomerania.

The village has a population of 99.
