= Gmina Marianowo =

Gmina Marianowo Marianowo Commune
- Gmina
- Coat of arms
- Interactive map of Gmina Marianowo
- Coordinates (Marianowo): 53°22′56″N 15°15′48″E
- Country: Poland
- Voivodeship: West Pomeranian
- County: Stargard
- Seat: Marianowo

Area
  - Total: 101.75 km^{2} (39.29 sq mi)

Population (2006)
  - Total: 3,137
  - Density: 30.83/km^{2} (79.85/sq mi)
- Website: http://www.marianowo.pl/

Gmina Marianowo is a rural gmina (administrative district) in Stargard County, West Pomeranian Voivodeship, in north-western Poland. Its seat is the village of Marianowo, which lies approximately 17 kilometres (11 mi) east of Stargard and 46 km (29 mi) east of the regional capital Szczecin.

The gmina covers an area of 101.75 square kilometres (39.3 sq mi), and as of 2006 its total population is 3,137.

== Villages ==
Gmina Marianowo contains the villages and settlements of Czarnkowo, Dalewo, Dzwonowo, Gogolewo, Kępy, Krzywiec, Mariankowo, Marianowo, Sulino, Trąbki, Trąbki Małe and Wiechowo.

== Neighbouring gminas ==
Gmina Marianowo is bordered by the town of Stargard and by the gminas of Chociwel, Dobrzany, Stara Dąbrowa, Stargard and Suchań.
