= Gmina Stara Dąbrowa =

Gmina Stara Dąbrowa Stara Dąbrowa Commune
- Gmina
- Coat of arms
- Interactive map of Gmina Stara Dąbrowa
- Coordinates (Stara Dąbrowa): 53°25′26″N 15°8′28″E
- Country: Poland
- Voivodeship: West Pomeranian
- County: Stargard
- Seat: Stara Dąbrowa

Area
  - Total: 112.59 km^{2} (43.47 sq mi)

Population (2006)
  - Total: 3,578
  - Density: 31.78/km^{2} (82.31/sq mi)
- Website: http://www.staradabrowa.pl/

Gmina Stara Dąbrowa is a rural gmina (administrative district) in Stargard County, West Pomeranian Voivodeship, in north-western Poland. Its seat is the village of Stara Dąbrowa, which lies approximately 13 kilometres (8 mi) north-east of Stargard and 38 km (24 mi) east of the regional capital Szczecin.

The gmina covers an area of 112.59 square kilometres (43.5 sq mi), and as of 2006 its total population is 3,578.

== Villages ==
Gmina Stara Dąbrowa contains the villages and settlements of Białuń, Chlebówko, Chlebowo, Kicko, Krzywnica, Łęczówka, Łęczyca, Łęczyna, Moskorze, Nowa Dąbrowa, Parlino, Rokicie, Rosowo, Stara Dąbrowa, Storkówko, Tolcz, Wiry and Załęcze.

== Neighbouring gminas ==
Gmina Stara Dąbrowa is bordered by the gminas of Chociwel, Marianowo, Maszewo and Stargard.
