= Kiczarowo =

- Village
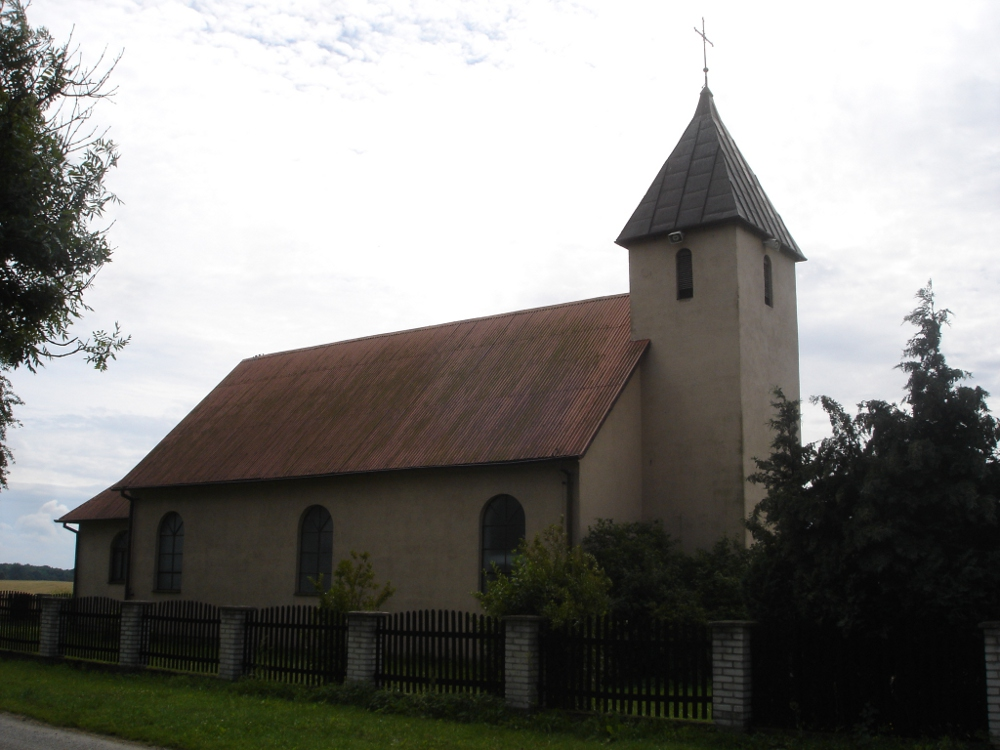
- Holy Family church in Kiczarowo

- Location within Poland
- Coordinates: 53°23′N 15°7′E
- Country: Poland
- Voivodeship: West Pomeranian
- County: Stargard
- Gmina: Stargard

Population
  - Total: 194
- Time zone: UTC+1 (CET)
  - Summer (DST): UTC+2 (CEST)
- Vehicle registration: ZST

Kiczarowo [kit͡ʂaˈrɔvɔ] is a village in the administrative district of Gmina Stargard, within Stargard County, West Pomeranian Voivodeship, in north-western Poland. It lies approximately 8 km (5 mi) north-east of Stargard and 36 km (22 mi) east of the regional capital Szczecin.

== History ==
The territory became part of the emerging Polish state under its first ruler Mieszko I around 967. Following the fragmentation of Poland, it was part of the Duchy of Pomerania. Following the dissolution of the duchy, it passed to Prussia and then unified Germany. During World War II, in 1941, the German administration operated a forced labour camp in the village.
