= Gmina Stargard =

Gmina Stargard Stargard Commune
- Gmina
- Flag Coat of arms
- Interactive map of Gmina Stargard
- Coordinates (Stargard): 53°20′N 15°2′E
- Country: Poland
- Voivodeship: West Pomeranian
- County: Stargard
- Seat: Stargard

Area
  - Total: 318.47 km^{2} (122.96 sq mi)

Population (2006)
  - Total: 11,322
  - Density: 35.551/km^{2} (92.077/sq mi)
- Website: http://www.gmina.stargard.pl/

Gmina Stargard is a rural gmina (administrative district) in Stargard County, West Pomeranian Voivodeship, in north-western Poland. Its seat is the town of Stargard, although the town is not part of the territory of the gmina.

The gmina covers an area of 318.47 square kilometres (123.0 sq mi), and as of 2006 its total population is 11,322.

Until December 31, 2015, gmina was known as Gmina Stargard Szczeciński.

== Villages ==
Gmina Stargard contains the villages and settlements of Barzkowice, Bębnikąt, Domanowo, Golczewo, Golina, Golinka, Grabowo, Grzędzice, Grzędziczki, Kępinka, Kiczarowo, Klępino, Kolonia Dolna-Grabowo, Kolonia Górna Grabowo, Koszewko, Koszewo, Krąpiel, Kurcewo, Lipnik, Luboń, Lubowo, Małkocin, Mężytki, Omięcin, Pęzino, Piaśnik, Piaszcze, Poczernin, Podlesie, Radziszewo, Rogowo, Siwkowo, Skalin, Smogolice, Sowno, Strachocin, Strumiany, Strzyżno, Sułkowo, Święte, Trzebiatów, Tychowo, Ulikowo, Warchlinko, Warchlino, Wierzchląd, Witkowo I, Witkowo II and Żarowo.

== Neighbouring gminas ==
Gmina Stargard is bordered by the town of Stargard and by the gminas of Dolice, Goleniów, Kobylanka, Marianowo, Maszewo, Stara Dąbrowa, Stare Czarnowo, Suchań and Warnice.
