= Tychowo, Stargard County =

Village in Poland

Tychowo
- Village
- Location within Poland
- Coordinates: 53°18′12″N 15°6′59″E
- Country: Poland
- Voivodeship: West Pomeranian
- County: Stargard
- Gmina: Stargard
- Population: 373

Tychowo [tɨˈxɔvɔ], (German: Hansfelde) is a village in the administrative district of Gmina Stargard, within Stargard County, West Pomeranian Voivodeship, in north-western Poland. It lies approximately 7 km (4 mi) south-east of Stargard and 38 km (24 mi) east of the regional capital Szczecin. The village has a population of 373.
