= Radziszewo, Stargard County =

Radziszewo
- Village
- Location within Poland
- Coordinates: 53°16′40″N 15°5′55″E
- Country: Poland
- Voivodeship: West Pomeranian
- County: Stargard
- Gmina: Stargard
- Population: 15

Radziszewo [rad͡ʑiˈʂɛvɔ] (German: Schneidersfelde) is a village in the administrative district of Gmina Stargard, within Stargard County, West Pomeranian Voivodeship, in north-western Poland.

The village has a population of 15.
