= Grabowo, Stargard County =

Grabowo
- Village
- Location within Poland
- Coordinates: 53°23′N 15°5′E
- Country: Poland
- Voivodeship: West Pomeranian
- County: Stargard
- Gmina: Stargard
- Population: 329

Grabowo [ɡraˈbɔvɔ] (German: Buchholz) is a village in the administrative district of Gmina Stargard, within Stargard County, West Pomeranian Voivodeship, in north-western Poland. It lies approximately 7 km (4 mi) north-east of Stargard and 34 km (21 mi) east of the regional capital Szczecin.

For the history of the region, see History of Pomerania.

The village has a population of 329.
