= Kunowo, Stargard County =

Kunowo
- Village
- Location within Poland
- Coordinates: 53°19′47″N 14°56′17″E
- Country: Poland
- Voivodeship: West Pomeranian
- County: Stargard
- Gmina: Kobylanka
- Population: 636

Kunowo [kuˈnɔvɔ] (German: Kunow an der Straße) is a village in the administrative district of Gmina Kobylanka, within Stargard County, West Pomeranian Voivodeship, in north-western Poland. It lies approximately 6 km (4 mi) south-east of Kobylanka, 7 km (4 mi) west of Stargard, and 26 km (16 mi) south-east of the regional capital Szczecin.

The village has a population of 636.

== See also ==
- History of Pomerania
