= Klępino =

- Village
- Location within Poland
- Coordinates: 53°22′N 15°2′E
- Country: Poland
- Voivodeship: West Pomeranian
- County: Stargard
- Gmina: Stargard
- Population: 423

Klępino [klɛmˈpinɔ] (German Klempin) is a village in the administrative district of Gmina Stargard, within Stargard County, West Pomeranian Voivodeship, in north-western Poland. It lies approximately 4 km (2 mi) north of Stargard and 31 km (19 mi) east of the regional capital Szczecin.

For the history of the region, see History of Pomerania.

The village has a population of 423.
