= Luboń, West Pomeranian Voivodeship =

Luboń
- Settlement
- Location within Poland
- Coordinates: 53°20′55″N 15°16′10″E
- Country: Poland
- Voivodeship: West Pomeranian
- County: Stargard
- Gmina: Stargard

Luboń [ˈlubɔɲ] (German: Peterhof) is a settlement in the administrative district of Gmina Stargard, within Stargard County, West Pomeranian Voivodeship, in north-western Poland.

For the history of the region, see History of Pomerania.
