= Luboń, Pomeranian Voivodeship =

Luboń
- Village
- Location within Poland
- Coordinates: 54°01′32″N 17°29′27″E
- Country: Poland
- Voivodeship: Pomeranian
- County: Bytów
- Gmina: Lipnica
- Population: 34
- Postal code: 77-130
- Area code: +48 59
- Vehicle registration: GBY
- Climate: Cfb

Luboń [ˈlubɔɲ] is a village in Gmina Lipnica, Bytów County, Pomeranian Voivodeship, in northern Poland.

From 1975 to 1998 the village was in Słupsk Voivodeship.
