= Gmina Kobylanka =

Gmina Kobylanka Kobylanka Commune
- Gmina
- Flag Coat of arms
- Interactive map of Gmina Kobylanka
- Coordinates (Kobylanka): 53°20′47″N 14°52′12″E
- Country: Poland
- Voivodeship: West Pomeranian
- County: Stargard
- Seat: Kobylanka

Area
  - Total: 122.05 km^{2} (47.12 sq mi)

Population (2006)
  - Total: 3,646
  - Density: 29.87/km^{2} (77.37/sq mi)
- Website: http://www.kobylanka.pl/

Gmina Kobylanka is a rural gmina (administrative district) in Stargard County, West Pomeranian Voivodeship, in north-western Poland. Its seat is the village of Kobylanka, which lies approximately 11 kilometres (7 mi) west of Stargard and 21 km (13 mi) east of the regional capital Szczecin. Its coat of arms refers to the agreement between Stargard and Szczecin concluded after the Wheat War in the 15th century.

The gmina covers an area of 122.05 square kilometres (47.1 sq mi), and as of 2006 its total population is 3,646.

== Villages ==
Gmina Kobylanka contains the villages and settlements of Bielkowo, Cisewo, Gajęcki Ług, Jęczydół, Kałęga, Kobylanka, Kunowo, Miedwiecko, Morawsko, Morzyczyn, Motaniec, Niedźwiedź, Rekowo, Reptowo, Wielichówko, Zagość and Zieleniewo.

== Neighbouring gminas ==
Gmina Kobylanka is bordered by the towns of Stargard and Szczecin, and by the gminas of Goleniów, Stare Czarnowo and Stargard.
