= Gmina Dolice =

Gmina Dolice Dolice Commune
- Gmina
- Coat of arms
- Interactive map of Gmina Dolice
- Coordinates (Dolice): 53°11′29″N 15°12′8″E
- Country: Poland
- Voivodeship: West Pomeranian
- County: Stargard
- Seat: Dolice

Area
  - Total: 237.13 km^{2} (91.56 sq mi)

Population (2006)
  - Total: 8,165
  - Density: 34.43/km^{2} (89.18/sq mi)
- Website: https://dolice.pl/

Gmina Dolice is a rural gmina (administrative district) in Stargard County, West Pomeranian Voivodeship, in north-western Poland. Its seat is the village of Dolice, which lies approximately 20 kilometres (12 mi) south-east of Stargard and 49 km (30 mi) south-east of the regional capital Szczecin.

The gmina covers an area of 237.13 square kilometres (91.6 sq mi), and as of 2006 its total population is 8,165.

== Villages ==
Gmina Dolice contains the villages and settlements of Boguszyce, Bralęcin, Brzezina, Dobropole Pyrzyckie, Dolice, Kolin, Komorowo, Krępcewo, Lipka, Mogilica, Morzyca, Moskorzyn, Płoszkowo, Pomietów, Przewłoki, Rzeplino, Sądów, Sądówko, Skrzany, Strzebielewo, Szemielino, Trzebień, Warszyn, Żalęcino, Ziemomyśl A and Ziemomyśl B.

== Neighbouring gminas ==
Gmina Dolice is bordered by the gminas of Barlinek, Choszczno, Pełczyce, Przelewice, Stargard, Suchań and Warnice.
