= Kobylanka, West Pomeranian Voivodeship =

Kobylanka
- Village
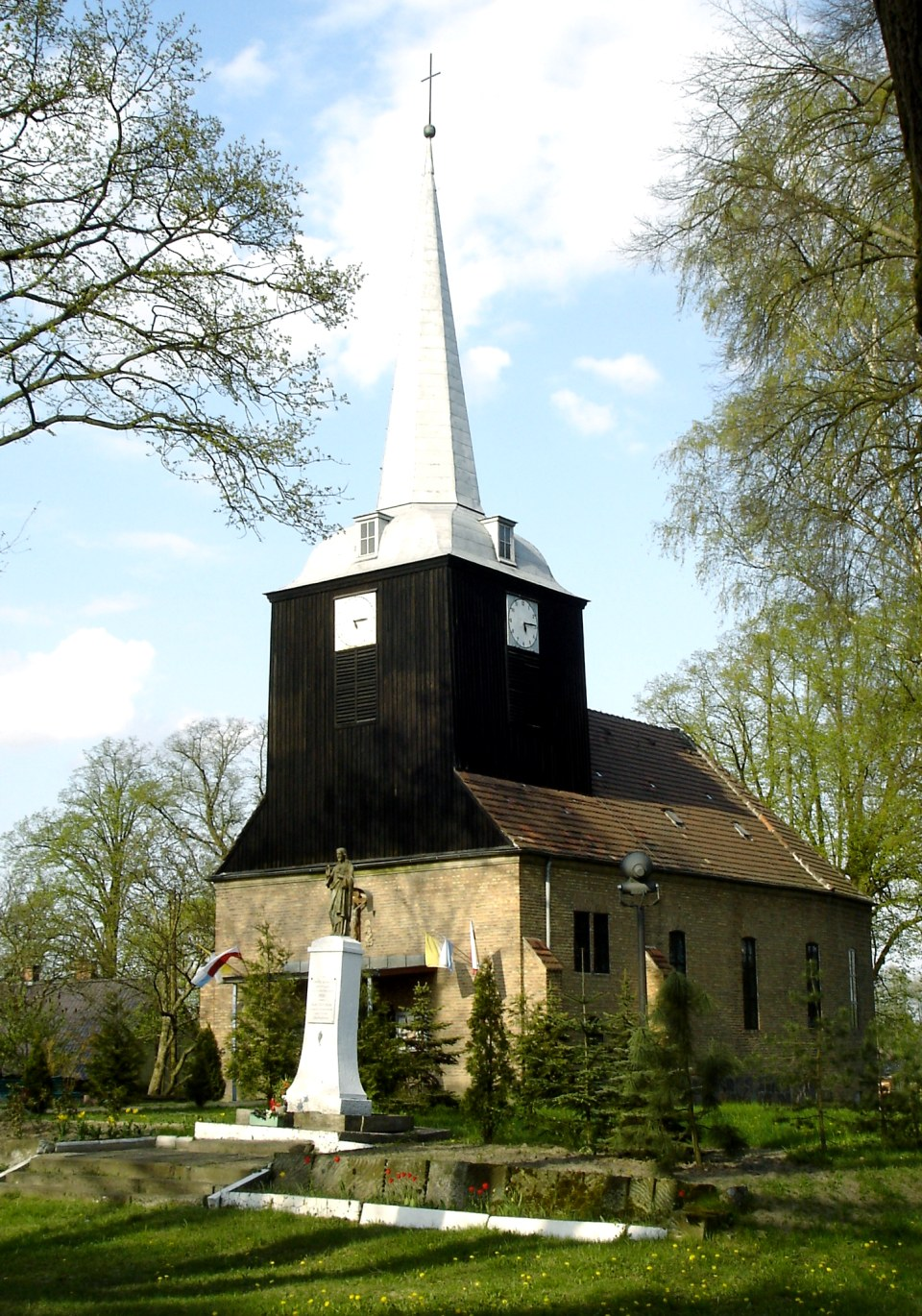
- Saint Anthony of Padua Church

- Location within Poland
- Coordinates: 53°20′47″N 14°52′12″E
- Country: Poland
- Voivodeship: West Pomeranian
- County: Stargard
- Gmina: Kobylanka
- Population: 1,513

Kobylanka [kɔbɨˈlanka] (German: Kublank) is a village in Stargard County, West Pomeranian Voivodeship, in north-western Poland. It is the seat of the gmina (administrative district) called Gmina Kobylanka. It lies approximately 11 km (7 mi) west of Stargard and 21 km (13 mi) east of the regional capital Szczecin.

For the history of the region, see History of Pomerania.

The village has a population of 1,513.
