= Marianowo, West Pomeranian Voivodeship =

Marianowo
- Village
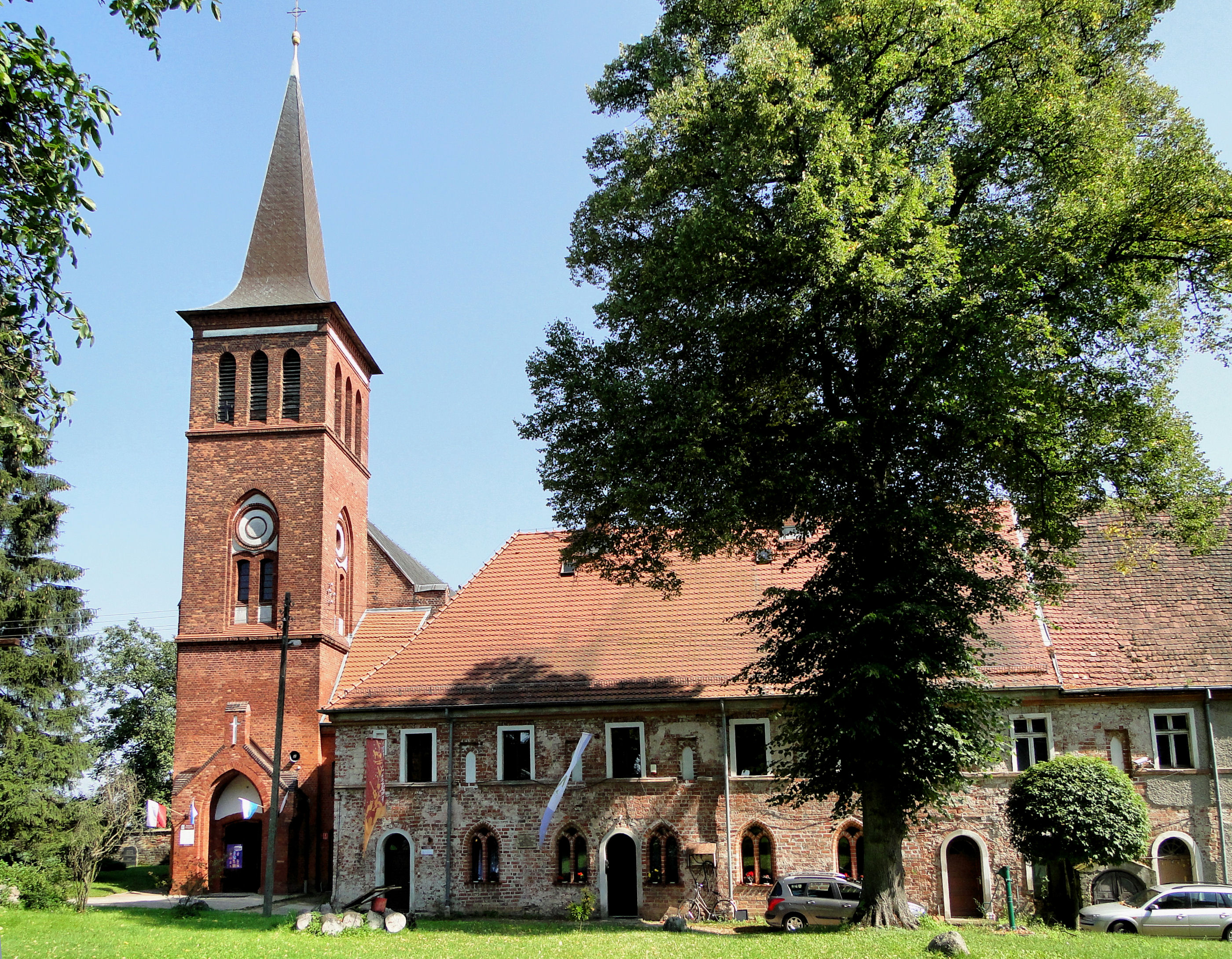
- Abbey and Immaculate Conception church

- Location within Poland
- Coordinates: 53°22′56″N 15°15′48″E
- Country: Poland
- Voivodeship: West Pomeranian
- County: Stargard
- Gmina: Marianowo

Population
  - Total: 910
- Time zone: UTC+1 (CET)
  - Summer (DST): UTC+2 (CEST)
- Vehicle registration: ZST

Marianowo [marjaˈnɔvɔ] is a village in Stargard County, West Pomeranian Voivodeship, in north-western Poland. It is the seat of the gmina (administrative district) called Gmina Marianowo. It lies approximately 17 km (11 mi) east of Stargard and 46 km (29 mi) east of the regional capital Szczecin.

The village has a population of 910.

It is situated on the eastern and northern shores of Lake Marianowskie.

== History ==
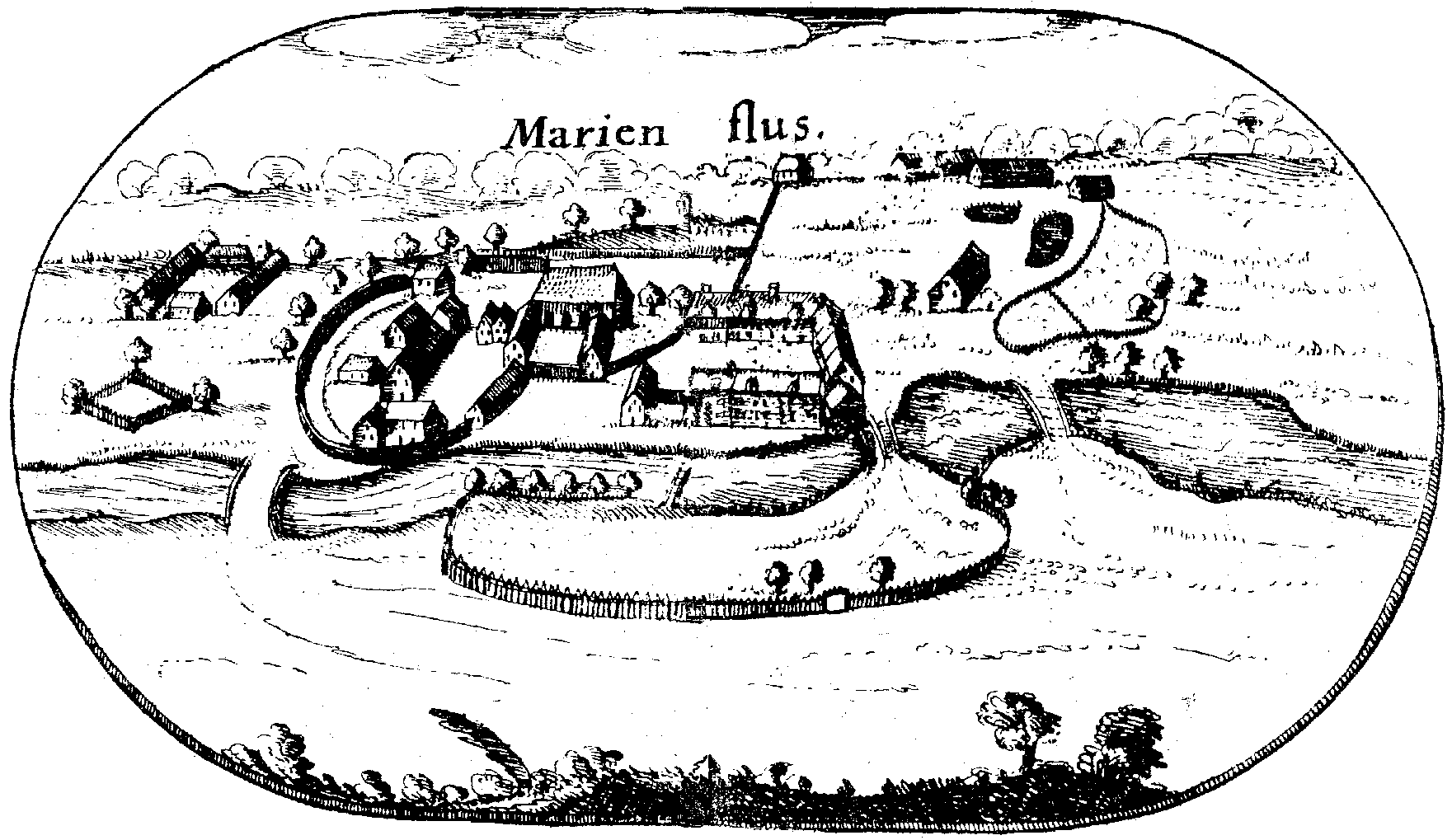
View of the abbey and village from 1618

The area became part of the emerging Polish state under its first historic ruler Mieszko I around 967. Following the fragmentation of Poland, it formed part of the Duchy of Pomerania. The origins of the village go back to the foundation of Cistercian monastery in 1228 by Duke Barnim I the Good of Pomerania from the Griffin dynasty. In 1228, Cistercian nuns arrived and founded an abbey in the village. After the Protestant Reformation, the nunnery was secularized in 1569, but its purpose, to harbour unmarried or widowed noble women from the Duchy of Pomerania, continued as a Lutheran convent (damsels' foundation) for noble women. One of these noble women was Sidonia von Borcke, famous for her trial for witchcraft in 1620.

On 28 June 1643 Gustavus Adolphus' daughter, Christina of Sweden, leased the estates of Marienfließ nunnery to Francis Henry of Saxe-Lauenburg for 10 years, after which it reverted to the new ruler of Pomerania, Frederick William, the Great elector, on 12 December 1653, rewarding Francis Henry's improvements to the estate.

Under Brandenburg rule the damsels' foundation was restituted, but dissolved in 1945, when Marienfließ was handed over to Poland.

== Notable people ==
- Eleonore Charlotte of Saxe-Lauenburg-Franzhagen (Marienfließ, 8 August 1646 – 26 January 1709, Franzhagen Castle), princess of Saxe-Lauenburg and heiress of Franzhagen estates.
- Manfred Swarsensky (1906 – 1981), German-American rabbi
