= Dolice, Gmina Dolice =

Dolice
- Village
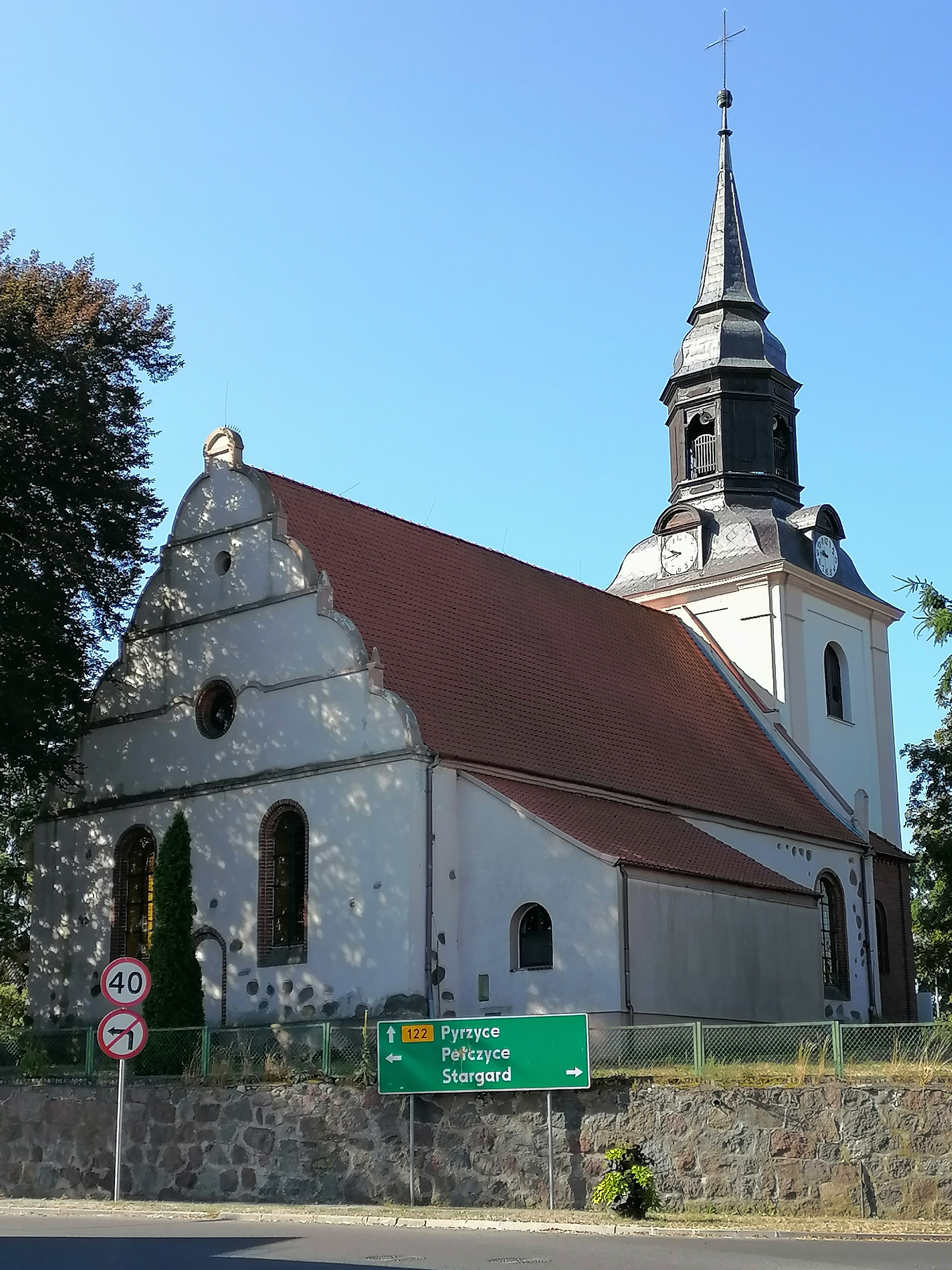
- Christ the King church in Dolice

- Location within Poland
- Coordinates: 53°11′29″N 15°12′8″E
- Country: Poland
- Voivodeship: West Pomeranian
- County: Stargard
- Gmina: Dolice

Population
  - Total: 2,000
- Time zone: UTC+1 (CET)
  - Summer (DST): UTC+2 (CEST)
- Vehicle registration: ZST

Dolice [dɔˈlit͡sɛ] (German: Dölitz) is a village in Stargard County, West Pomeranian Voivodeship, in north-western Poland. It is the seat of the gmina (administrative district) called Gmina Dolice. It lies approximately 20 km (12 mi) south-east of Stargard and 49 km (30 mi) south-east of the regional capital Szczecin.
