= Stara Dąbrowa, West Pomeranian Voivodeship =

Stara Dąbrowa
- Village
- Location within Poland
- Coordinates: 53°25′26″N 15°8′28″E
- Country: Poland
- Voivodeship: West Pomeranian
- County: Stargard
- Gmina: Stara Dąbrowa
- Population: 618

Stara Dąbrowa [ˈstara dɔmˈbrɔva], (German Alt Damerow) is a village in Stargard County, West Pomeranian Voivodeship, in north-western Poland. It is the seat of the gmina (administrative district) called Gmina Stara Dąbrowa. It lies approximately 13 km (8 mi) north-east of Stargard and 38 km (24 mi) east of the regional capital Szczecin.

The village has a population of 618.
