= Stargard County =

Stargard County Powiat stargardzki
- County
- Flag Coat of arms

- Location within the voivodeship

- Division into gminas
- Coordinates (Stargard): 53°20′N 15°2′E
- Country: Poland
- Voivodeship: West Pomeranian
- Seat: Stargard
- Gminas: Total 10 (incl. 1 urban): Stargard; Gmina Chociwel; Gmina Dobrzany; Gmina Dolice; Gmina Ińsko; Gmina Kobylanka; Gmina Marianowo; Gmina Stara Dąbrowa; Gmina Stargard; Gmina Suchań

Area
  - Total: 1,519.59 km^{2} (586.72 sq mi)

Population (2006)
  - Total: 119,402
  - Density: 78.5751/km^{2} (203.509/sq mi)
  - Urban: 79,686
  - Rural: 39,716
- Car plates: ZST
- Website: www.powiatstargardzki.pl

Stargard County (Polish: powiat stargardzki) is a unit of territorial administration and local government (powiat) in West Pomeranian Voivodeship, north-western Poland. It came into being on January 1, 1999, as a result of the Polish local government reforms passed in 1998. Its administrative seat and largest town is Stargard, which lies 32 kilometres (20 mi) east of the regional capital Szczecin. The county contains four other towns: Chociwel, 26 km (16 mi) north-east of Stargard, Dobrzany, 27 km (17 mi) east of Stargard, Ińsko, 37 km (23 mi) east of Stargard, and Suchań, 21 km (13 mi) east of Stargard.

The county covers an area of 1,519.59 square kilometres (586.7 sq mi). As of 2006 its total population is 119,402, out of which the population of Stargard is 70,534, that of Chociwel is 3,285, that of Dobrzany is 2,420, that of Ińsko is 2,001, that of Suchań is 1,446, and the rural population is 39,716.

== Neighbouring counties ==
Stargard County is bordered by Goleniów County to the north, Łobez County to the north-east, Drawsko County to the east, Choszczno County to the south-east, Myślibórz County and Pyrzyce County to the south, and Gryfino County and the city of Szczecin to the west.

== Administrative divisions ==
The county is subdivided into 10 gminas (one urban, four urban-rural and five rural). These are listed in the following table, in descending order of population.

Gmina	Type	Area (km^{2})	Population (2006)	Seat
Stargard	urban	48.1	70,534	
Gmina Stargard	rural	318.5	11,322	Stargard *
Gmina Dolice	rural	237.1	8,165	Dolice
Gmina Chociwel	urban-rural	160.6	6,106	Chociwel
Gmina Dobrzany	urban-rural	135.1	5,073	Dobrzany
Gmina Suchań	urban-rural	132.8	4,324	Suchań
Gmina Kobylanka	rural	122.1	3,646	Kobylanka
Gmina Stara Dąbrowa	rural	112.6	3,578	Stara Dąbrowa
Gmina Ińsko	urban-rural	151.0	3,517	Ińsko
Gmina Marianowo	rural	101.8	3,137	Marianowo
* seat not part of the gmina
