= Przelewice =

Przelewice may refer to:

- Przelewice, Pyrzyce County, a village in Pyrzyce County, West Pomeranian Voivodeship, Poland
  - Gmina Przelewice, a rural gmina (administrative district) in Pyrzyce County, West Pomeranian Voivodeship
- Przelewice, Wałcz County, a village in the administrative district of Gmina Człopa, Wałcz County, West Pomeranian Voivodeship, Poland

== See also ==
- Prillwitz
- Przywodzie, Gmina Przelewice, a village in the administrative district of Gmina Przelewice, Poland
