= Kosin, Pyrzyce County =

Kosin
- Village
- Location within Poland
- Coordinates: 53°7′N 15°3′E
- Country: Poland
- Voivodeship: West Pomeranian
- County: Pyrzyce
- Gmina: Przelewice
- Population (2015): 140

Kosin [ˈkɔɕin] (German: Kossin) is a village in the administrative district of Gmina Przelewice, within Pyrzyce County, West Pomeranian Voivodeship, in north-western Poland. It lies approximately 3 km (2 mi) north-west of Przelewice, 12 km (7 mi) east of Pyrzyce, and 46 km (29 mi) south-east of the regional capital Szczecin.

For the history of the region, see History of Pomerania.
