= Jesionowo, West Pomeranian Voivodeship =

Jesionowo
- Village
- Location within Poland
- Coordinates: 53°3′N 15°6′E
- Country: Poland
- Voivodeship: West Pomeranian
- County: Pyrzyce
- Gmina: Przelewice
- Website: www.jesionowo.prv.pl

Jesionowo [jɛɕɔˈnɔvɔ] (German: Schönow) is a village in the administrative district of Gmina Przelewice, within Pyrzyce County, West Pomeranian Voivodeship, in north-western Poland. It lies approximately 7 km (4 mi) south of Przelewice, 18 km (11 mi) south-east of Pyrzyce, and 54 km (34 mi) south-east of the regional capital Szczecin.

For the history of the region, see History of Pomerania.
