= Babinek, Pyrzyce County =

Babinek
- Village
- Location within Poland
- Coordinates: 53°15′35″N 14°43′24″E
- Country: Poland
- Voivodeship: West Pomeranian
- County: Pyrzyce
- Gmina: Bielice

Babinek [baˈbinɛk] is a village in the administrative district of Gmina Bielice, within Pyrzyce County, West Pomeranian Voivodeship, in north-western Poland. It lies approximately 7 km (4 mi) north of Bielice, 18 km (11 mi) north-west of Pyrzyce, and 20 km (12 mi) south-east of the regional capital Szczecin.
