= Batowo =

- Village
- Location within Poland
- Coordinates: 53°3′23″N 14°57′32″E
- Country: Poland
- Voivodeship: West Pomeranian
- County: Pyrzyce
- Gmina: Lipiany
- Time zone: UTC+1 (CET)
  - Summer (DST): UTC+2 (CEST)
- Vehicle registration: ZPY

Batowo [baˈtɔvɔ] is a village in the administrative district of Gmina Lipiany, within Pyrzyce County, West Pomeranian Voivodeship, in north-western Poland. It lies approximately 7 km (4 mi) north of Lipiany, 10 km (6 mi) south-east of Pyrzyce, and 48 km (30 mi) south-east of the regional capital Szczecin.

During the Thirty Years' War Batowo was so badly destroyed, that during the restoration it was moved to another place.
