= Płońsko =

- Village
- Location within Poland
- Coordinates: 53°6′N 15°9′E
- Country: Poland
- Voivodeship: West Pomeranian
- County: Pyrzyce
- Gmina: Przelewice

Płońsko (Polish: [ˈpwɔj̃skɔ]; German: Plönzig) is a village in the administrative district of Gmina Przelewice, within Pyrzyce County, West Pomeranian Voivodeship, in north-western Poland. It lies approximately 5 km (3 mi) east of Przelewice, 19 km (12 mi) east of Pyrzyce, and 52 km (32 mi) south-east of the regional capital Szczecin.

For the history of the region, see History of Pomerania.
