= Wądół, West Pomeranian Voivodeship =

Wądół
- Neighbourhood of Lipiany
- Location within Poland
- Coordinates: 53°1′N 14°58′E
- Country: Poland
- Voivodeship: West Pomeranian
- County: Pyrzyce
- Gmina: Lipiany
- Town: Lipiany
- Within town limits: 2022
- Time zone: UTC+1 (CET)
  - Summer (DST): UTC+2 (CEST)
- Vehicle registration: ZPY

Wądół [ˈvɔnduu̯] is a neighbourhood of Lipiany, located in the north-eastern part of the town, in the administrative district of Gmina Lipiany, within Pyrzyce County, West Pomeranian Voivodeship, in north-western Poland. It lies approximately 15 km (9 mi) south-east of Pyrzyce, and 52 km (32 mi) south-east of the regional capital Szczecin.
