= Kluki, West Pomeranian Voivodeship =

Kluki
- Village
- Location within Poland
- Coordinates: 53°8′N 15°4′E
- Country: Poland
- Voivodeship: West Pomeranian
- County: Pyrzyce
- Gmina: Przelewice
- Population: 100

Kluki [ˈkluki] (German: Klücken) is a village in the administrative district of Gmina Przelewice, within Pyrzyce County, West Pomeranian Voivodeship, in north-western Poland. It lies approximately 4 km (2 mi) north of Przelewice, 13 km (8 mi) east of Pyrzyce, and 45 km (28 mi) south-east of the regional capital Szczecin.

For the history of the region, see History of Pomerania.

The village has a population of 100.
