= Swochowo, West Pomeranian Voivodeship =

Swochowo
- Village
- Location within Poland
- Coordinates: 53°10′N 14°42′E
- Country: Poland
- Voivodeship: West Pomeranian
- County: Pyrzyce
- Gmina: Bielice

Swochowo [sfɔˈxɔvɔ] (German: Schwochow) is a village in the administrative district of Gmina Bielice, within Pyrzyce County, West Pomeranian Voivodeship, in north-western Poland. It lies approximately 5 km (3 mi) south-west of Bielice, 13 km (8 mi) west of Pyrzyce, and 29 km (18 mi) south of the regional capital Szczecin.

For the history of the region, see History of Pomerania.
