= Oćwieka, West Pomeranian Voivodeship =

Oćwieka
- Settlement
- Location within Poland
- Coordinates: 53°8′29″N 15°3′51″E
- Country: Poland
- Voivodeship: West Pomeranian
- County: Pyrzyce
- Gmina: Przelewice

Oćwieka ([ɔt͡ɕˈfjɛka], German: Woitfick) is a settlement in the administrative district of Gmina Przelewice, within Pyrzyce County, West Pomeranian Voivodeship, in north-western Poland. It lies approximately 5 km (3 mi) north of Przelewice, 13 km (8 mi) east of Pyrzyce, and 45 km (28 mi) south-east of the regional capital Szczecin.

For the history of the region, see History of Pomerania.
