= Lucin, West Pomeranian Voivodeship =

Lucin
- Village
- Location within Poland
- Coordinates: 53°4′N 15°5′E
- Country: Poland
- Voivodeship: West Pomeranian
- County: Pyrzyce
- Gmina: Przelewice

Lucin [ˈlut͡ɕin] (German: Luisenhof) is a village in the administrative district of Gmina Przelewice, within Pyrzyce County, West Pomeranian Voivodeship, in north-western Poland. It lies approximately 5 km (3 mi) south of Przelewice, 16 km (10 mi) south-east of Pyrzyce, and 52 km (32 mi) south-east of the regional capital Szczecin.

For the history of the region, see History of Pomerania.
