= Stare Chrapowo =

- Village
- Location within Poland
- Coordinates: 53°10′N 14°47′E
- Country: Poland
- Voivodeship: West Pomeranian
- County: Pyrzyce
- Gmina: Bielice

Stare Chrapowo [ˈstarɛ xraˈpɔvɔ] (German: Alt Grape) is a village in the administrative district of Gmina Bielice, within Pyrzyce County, West Pomeranian Voivodeship, in north-western Poland. It lies approximately 6 km (4 mi) south-east of Bielice, 8 km (5 mi) north-west of Pyrzyce, and 31 km (19 mi) south-east of the regional capital Szczecin.

For the history of the region, see History of Pomerania.
