= Bylice, West Pomeranian Voivodeship =

Bylice
- Village
- Location within Poland
- Coordinates: 53°5′N 15°0′E
- Country: Poland
- Voivodeship: West Pomeranian
- County: Pyrzyce
- Gmina: Przelewice

Bylice [bɨˈlit͡sɛ] (German: Klein Lindenbusch) is a village in the administrative district of Gmina Przelewice, within Pyrzyce County, West Pomeranian Voivodeship, in north-western Poland. It lies approximately 6 km (4 mi) south-west of Przelewice, 10 km (6 mi) south-east of Pyrzyce, and 47 km (29 mi) south-east of the regional capital Szczecin.

For the history of the region, see History of Pomerania.
