= Łosiniec, West Pomeranian Voivodeship =

Łosiniec
- Neighbourhood of Lipiany
- Location within Poland
- Coordinates: 52°59′43″N 14°58′55″E
- Country: Poland
- Voivodeship: West Pomeranian
- County: Pyrzyce
- Gmina: Lipiany
- Time zone: UTC+1 (CET)
  - Summer (DST): UTC+2 (CEST)
- Vehicle registration: ZPY

Łosiniec [wɔˈɕiɲɛt͡s] (German: Karlsruhe) is a neighbourhood of the town of Lipiany, in the administrative district of Gmina Lipiany, within Pyrzyce County, West Pomeranian Voivodeship, in north-western Poland.
