= Głębokie, Pyrzyce County =

Głębokie
- Village
- Location within Poland
- Coordinates: 53°00′38″N 14°59′45″E
- Country: Poland
- Voivodeship: West Pomeranian
- County: Pyrzyce
- Gmina: Lipiany
- Time zone: UTC+1 (CET)
  - Summer (DST): UTC+2 (CEST)
- Vehicle registration: ZPY

Głębokie ([ɡwɛmˈbɔkʲɛ]; German: Ferdinandsthal) is a przysiółek, part of the village of Miedzyn in the administrative district of Gmina Lipiany, within Pyrzyce County, West Pomeranian Voivodeship, in north-western Poland.
