= Nowe Chrapowo =

- Village
- Location within Poland
- Coordinates: 53°9′N 14°47′E
- Country: Poland
- Voivodeship: West Pomeranian
- County: Pyrzyce
- Gmina: Bielice

Nowe Chrapowo [ˈnɔvɛ xraˈpɔvɔ] (German: Neu Grape) is a village in the administrative district of Gmina Bielice, within Pyrzyce County, West Pomeranian Voivodeship, in north-western Poland. It lies approximately 7 km (4 mi) south-east of Bielice, 7 km (4 mi) west of Pyrzyce, and 33 km (21 mi) south-east of the regional capital Szczecin.

For the history of the region, see History of Pomerania.

== Notable residents ==
- Richard Voß (1851-1918), dramatist and novelist
