= Małcz =

- Neighbourhood of Lipiany
- Location within Poland
- Coordinates: 52°59′44″N 14°58′13″E
- Country: Poland
- Voivodeship: West Pomeranian
- County: Pyrzyce
- Gmina: Lipiany
- Town: Lipiany
- Within town limits: 2022
- Time zone: UTC+1 (CET)
  - Summer (DST): UTC+2 (CEST)
- Vehicle registration: ZPY

Małcz [mau̯t͡ʂ] (German: Malzmühle) is a neighbourhood of the town of Lipiany, in the administrative district of Gmina Lipiany, within Pyrzyce County, West Pomeranian Voivodeship, in north-western Poland.

Formerly a separate village, it was included within the town limits of Lipiany in 2022.
