= Skrzynka, West Pomeranian Voivodeship =

Skrzynka
- Village
- Location within Poland
- Coordinates: 53°2′N 14°57′E
- Country: Poland
- Voivodeship: West Pomeranian
- County: Pyrzyce
- Gmina: Lipiany
- Time zone: UTC+1 (CET)
  - Summer (DST): UTC+2 (CEST)
- Vehicle registration: ZPY

Skrzynka [ˈskʂɨnka] is a village in the administrative district of Gmina Lipiany, within Pyrzyce County, West Pomeranian Voivodeship, in north-western Poland. It lies approximately 4 km (2 mi) north of Lipiany, 12 km (7 mi) south of Pyrzyce, and 50 km (31 mi) south-east of the regional capital Szczecin.
