= Dębiec, West Pomeranian Voivodeship =

Dębiec
- Village
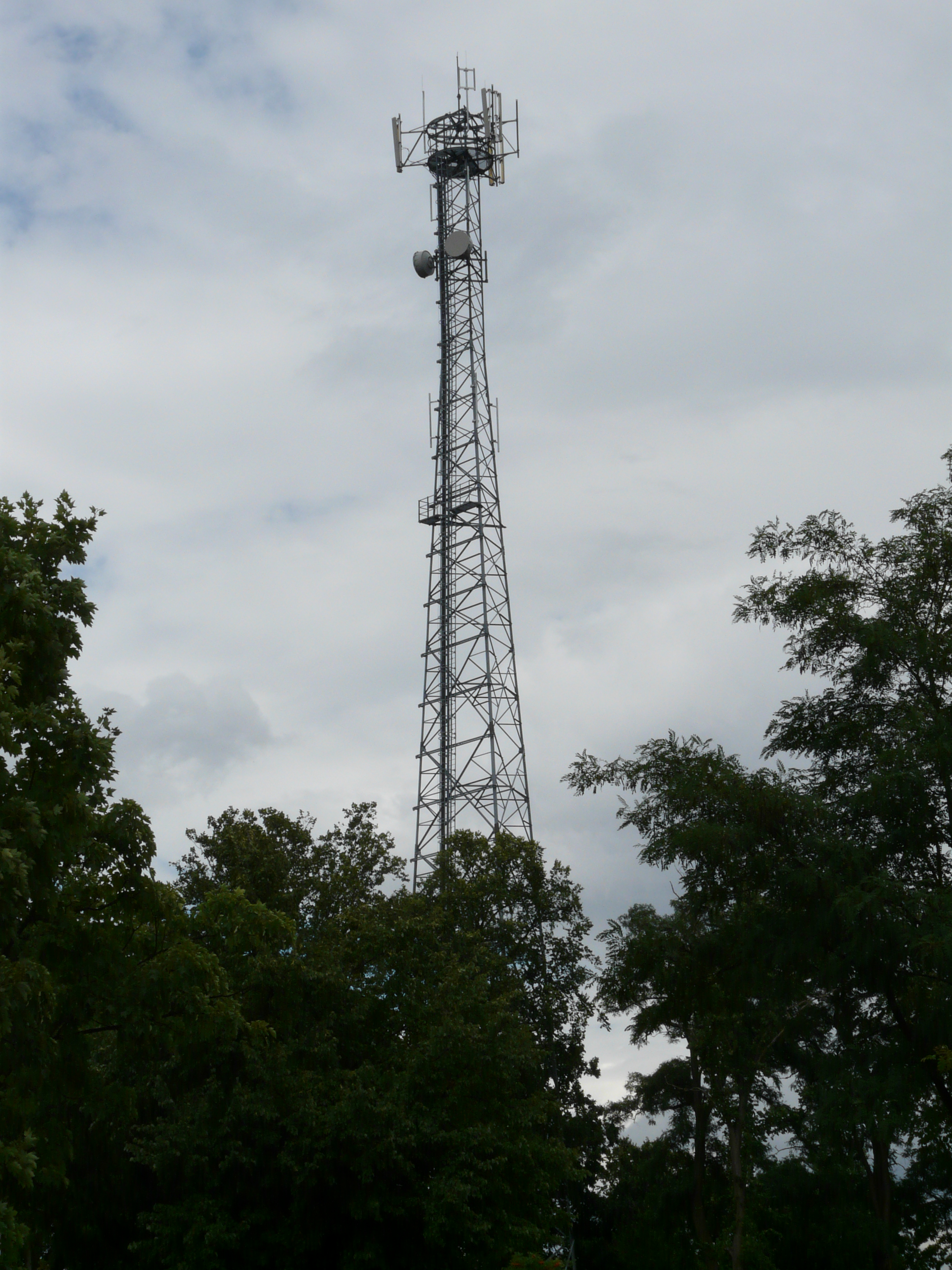

- Location within Poland
- Coordinates: 53°1′N 14°55′E
- Country: Poland
- Voivodeship: West Pomeranian
- County: Pyrzyce
- Gmina: Lipiany
- Time zone: UTC+1 (CET)
  - Summer (DST): UTC+2 (CEST)
- Vehicle registration: ZPY

Dębiec [ˈdɛmbjɛt͡s] is a village in the administrative district of Gmina Lipiany, within Pyrzyce County, West Pomeranian Voivodeship, in north-western Poland. It lies approximately 4 km (2 mi) north-west of Lipiany, 14 km (9 mi) south of Pyrzyce, and 50 km (31 mi) south-east of the regional capital Szczecin.
