= Krasne, West Pomeranian Voivodeship =

Krasne
- Village
- Location within Poland
- Coordinates: 53°4′N 14°59′E
- Country: Poland
- Voivodeship: West Pomeranian
- County: Pyrzyce
- Gmina: Lipiany
- Postal code: 74-230

Krasne [ˈkrasnɛ] (German: Kraazen) is a village in the administrative district of Gmina Lipiany, within Pyrzyce County, West Pomeranian Voivodeship, in north-western Poland. It lies approximately 8 km (5 mi) north of Lipiany, 10 km (6 mi) south-east of Pyrzyce, and 48 km (30 mi) south-east of the regional capital Szczecin.
