= Kłodzino, Pyrzyce County =

Kłodzino
- Village
- Location within Poland
- Coordinates: 53°6′N 15°6′E
- Country: Poland
- Voivodeship: West Pomeranian
- County: Pyrzyce
- Gmina: Przelewice
- Population: 600

Kłodzino [kwɔˈd͡ʑinɔ] (German: Kloxin) is a village in the administrative district of Gmina Przelewice, within Pyrzyce County, West Pomeranian Voivodeship, in north-western Poland. It lies approximately 2 km (1 mi) east of Przelewice, 15 km (9 mi) east of Pyrzyce, and 50 km (31 mi) south-east of the regional capital Szczecin.

For the history of the region, see History of Pomerania.

The village has a population of 600.
