= Linie, West Pomeranian Voivodeship =

Linie
- Village
- Location within Poland
- Coordinates: 53°11′N 14°45′E
- Country: Poland
- Voivodeship: West Pomeranian
- County: Pyrzyce
- Gmina: Bielice
- Population: 510

Linie [ˈliɲɛ] (German: Leine) is a village in the administrative district of Gmina Bielice, within Pyrzyce County, West Pomeranian Voivodeship, in north-western Poland. It lies approximately 3 km (2 mi) south-east of Bielice, 11 km (7 mi) north-west of Pyrzyce, and 29 km (18 mi) south-east of the regional capital Szczecin.

== See also ==
History of Pomerania
