= Żuków, West Pomeranian Voivodeship =

Żuków
- Village
- Location within Poland
- Coordinates: 53°9′N 15°6′E
- Country: Poland
- Voivodeship: West Pomeranian
- County: Pyrzyce
- Gmina: Przelewice

Żuków [ˈʐukuf] (German: Suckow an der Plöne) is a village in the administrative district of Gmina Przelewice, within Pyrzyce County, West Pomeranian Voivodeship, in north-western Poland. It lies approximately 6 km (4 mi) north of Przelewice, 15 km (9 mi) east of Pyrzyce, and 46 km (29 mi) south-east of the regional capital Szczecin.

For the history of the region, see History of Pomerania.
