= Ślazowo =

- Village
- Location within Poland
- Coordinates: 53°5′N 15°3′E
- Country: Poland
- Voivodeship: West Pomeranian
- County: Pyrzyce
- Gmina: Przelewice

Ślazowo [ɕlaˈzɔvɔ] (German: Malwinenvorwerk) is a village in the administrative district of Gmina Przelewice, within Pyrzyce County, West Pomeranian Voivodeship, in north-western Poland. It lies approximately 3 km (2 mi) south-west of Przelewice, 13 km (8 mi) south-east of Pyrzyce, and 49 km (30 mi) south-east of the regional capital Szczecin.

For the history of the region, see History of Pomerania.
