= Chabowo =

- Village
- Location within Poland
- Coordinates: 53°13′N 14°46′E
- Country: Poland
- Voivodeship: West Pomeranian
- County: Pyrzyce
- Gmina: Bielice

Chabowo [xaˈbɔvɔ] (German: Alt Falkenberg) is a village in the administrative district of Gmina Bielice, within Pyrzyce County, West Pomeranian Voivodeship, in north-western Poland. It lies approximately 4 km (2 mi) north-east of Bielice, 13 km (8 mi) north-west of Pyrzyce, and 26 km (16 mi) south-east of the regional capital Szczecin.
