= Wołdowo =

- Village
- Location within Poland
- Coordinates: 53°5′N 15°10′E
- Country: Poland
- Voivodeship: West Pomeranian
- County: Pyrzyce
- Gmina: Przelewice

Wołdowo [vɔu̯ˈdɔvɔ] (German: Waldowsaue) is a village in the administrative district of Gmina Przelewice, within Pyrzyce County, West Pomeranian Voivodeship, in north-western Poland. It lies approximately 7 km (4 mi) east of Przelewice, 20 km (12 mi) east of Pyrzyce, and 54 km (34 mi) south-east of the regional capital Szczecin.

For the history of the region, see History of Pomerania.
