= Parsów =

- Village
- Location within Poland
- Coordinates: 53°13′N 14°43′E
- Country: Poland
- Voivodeship: West Pomeranian
- County: Pyrzyce
- Gmina: Bielice
- Population: 382

Parsów [ˈparsuf] (German: Wartenberg) is a village in the administrative district of Gmina Bielice, within Pyrzyce County, West Pomeranian Voivodeship, in north-western Poland. It lies approximately 3 km (2 mi) north-west of Bielice, 15 km (9 mi) north-west of Pyrzyce, and 24 km (15 mi) south of the regional capital Szczecin.

For the history of the region, see History of Pomerania.
