= Sulino, Pyrzyce County =

Sulino
- Village
- Location within Poland
- Coordinates: 52°59′05″N 14°58′51″E
- Country: Poland
- Voivodeship: West Pomeranian
- County: Pyrzyce
- Gmina: Lipiany

Sulino [suˈlinɔ] is a village in the administrative district of Gmina Lipiany, within Pyrzyce County, West Pomeranian Voivodeship, in north-western Poland.
