= Louisenhöhe =

Louisenhöhe may refer to two different villages in Poland called Louisenhöhe in German:

- Będzin, West Pomeranian Voivodeship, a village in northwestern Poland
- Stradzewo, Lubusz Voivodeship, a village of 30 in western Poland
