= Przywodzie, Gmina Przelewice =

Przywodzie
- Village
- Location within Poland
- Coordinates: 53°7′N 15°9′E
- Country: Poland
- Voivodeship: West Pomeranian
- County: Pyrzyce
- Gmina: Przelewice
- Population: 440

Przywodzie [pʂɨˈvɔd͡ʑɛ] (German: Fürstensee) is a village in the administrative district of Gmina Przelewice, within Pyrzyce County, West Pomeranian Voivodeship, in north-western Poland. It lies approximately 6 km (4 mi) east of Przelewice, 18 km (11 mi) east of Pyrzyce, and 51 km (32 mi) south-east of the regional capital Szczecin.

For the history of the region, see History of Pomerania.

The village has an estimated population of 440.
