= Chabówko =

- Village
- Location within Poland
- Coordinates: 53°13′53″N 14°47′57″E
- Country: Poland
- Voivodeship: West Pomeranian
- County: Pyrzyce
- Gmina: Bielice

Chabówko [xaˈbufkɔ] (German: Neu Falkenberg) is a village in the administrative district of Gmina Bielice, within Pyrzyce County, West Pomeranian Voivodeship, in north-western Poland.
