= Czarnowo, West Pomeranian Voivodeship =

Czarnowo
- Village
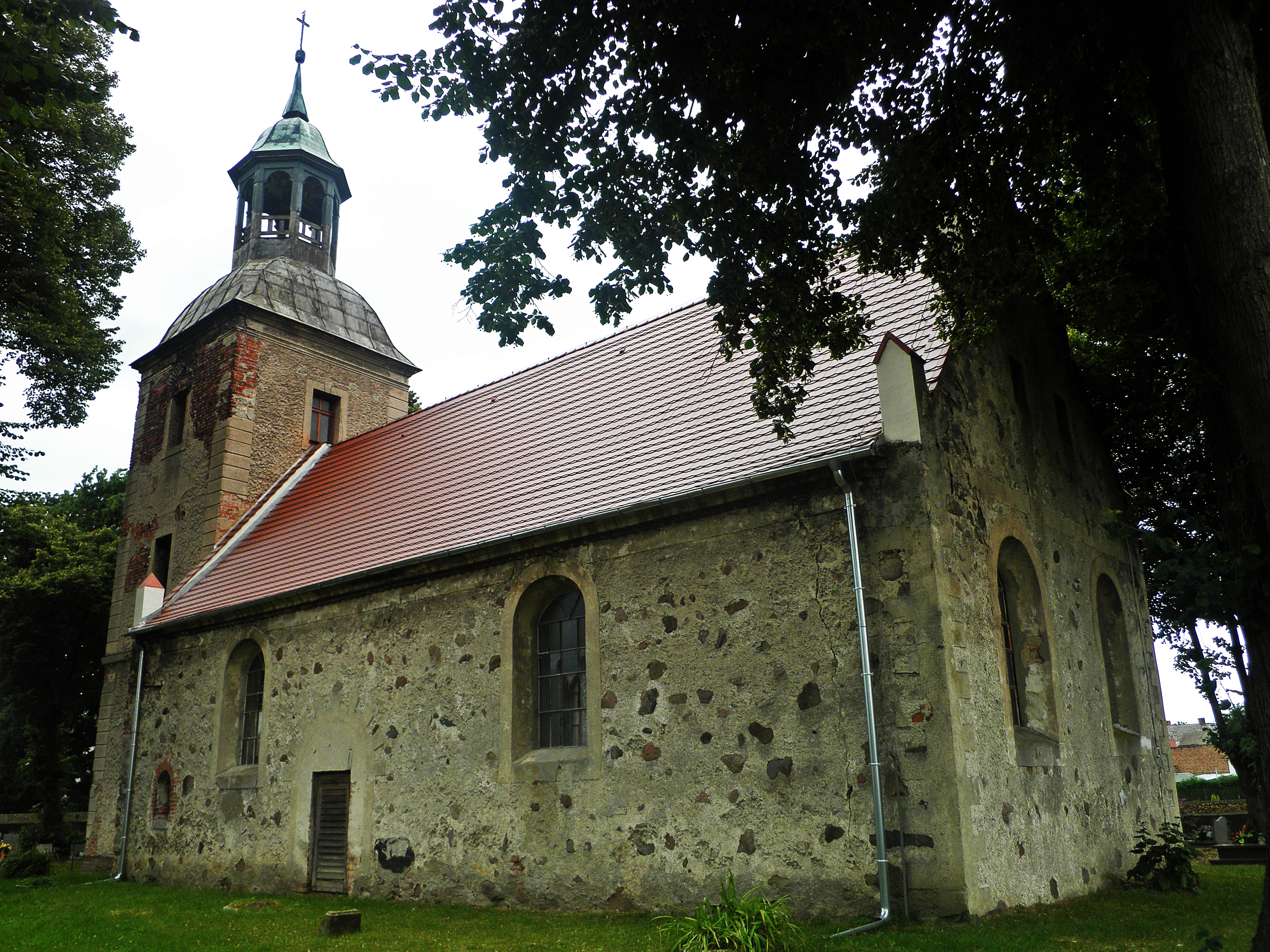
- Holy Spirit church in Czarnowo

- Location within Poland
- Coordinates: 53°08′07″N 14°45′01″E
- Country: Poland
- Voivodeship: West Pomeranian
- County: Pyrzyce
- Gmina: Kozielice
- Time zone: UTC+1 (CET)
  - Summer (DST): UTC+2 (CEST)

Czarnowo [t͡ʂarˈnɔvɔ] is a village in the administrative district of Gmina Kozielice, within Pyrzyce County, West Pomeranian Voivodeship, in north-western Poland.

In 1322 the village was granted to the town of Pyrzyce by Pomeranian Dukes Otto I and Barnim III.
