= Brzostowo, Pyrzyce County =

Brzostowo
- Village
- Location within Poland
- Coordinates: 53°0′26″N 15°1′24″E
- Country: Poland
- Voivodeship: West Pomeranian
- County: Pyrzyce
- Gmina: Lipiany

Brzostowo [bʐɔsˈtɔvɔ] is a village in the administrative district of Gmina Lipiany, within Pyrzyce County, West Pomeranian Voivodeship, in north-western Poland.
