= Marienwerder (disambiguation) =

The German place name Marienwerder refers to:

- Marienwerder, the German name of the city Kwidzyn, in northern Poland
- Mareinwerder, the German name of the village Załęże, in northwestern Poland
- Marienwerder (region), a former government region of Prussia
- Marienwerder (district), a former district of Prussia
- Marienwerder, Brandenburg, a community in the administrative district of Barnim, Germany
- Part of the urban district Herrenhausen-Stöcken in the city of Hanover, Germany
