= Przywodzie, Gmina Lipiany =

Przywodzie
- Settlement
- Location within Poland
- Coordinates: 53°00′22″N 14°55′03″E
- Country: Poland
- Voivodeship: West Pomeranian
- County: Pyrzyce
- Gmina: Lipiany

Przywodzie [pʂɨˈvɔd͡ʑɛ] is a settlement in the administrative district of Gmina Lipiany, within Pyrzyce County, West Pomeranian Voivodeship, in north-western Poland.
