= Zadeklino =

- Village
- Location within Poland
- Coordinates: 53°06′57″N 14°45′26″E
- Country: Poland
- Voivodeship: West Pomeranian
- County: Pyrzyce
- Gmina: Kozielice

Zadeklino [zadɛˈklinɔ] is a village in the administrative district of Gmina Kozielice, within Pyrzyce County, West Pomeranian Voivodeship, in north-western Poland.

For the history of the region, see History of Pomerania.
