= Wołczyn (disambiguation) =

Wołczyn may refer to:

- Wołczyn, a town in the Opole Voivodship, Poland
- Wołczyn, West Pomeranian Voivodeship (north-west Poland)
- Wołczyn, Polish spelling of Vowchyn (Воўчын), a village in Belarus
