= Gardziec =

- Village
- Location within Poland
- Coordinates: 53°06′41″N 15°10′07″E
- Country: Poland
- Voivodeship: West Pomeranian
- County: Pyrzyce
- Gmina: Przelewice

Gardziec [ˈɡard͡ʑɛt͡s] (German: Gartz an der Plöne) is a village in the administrative district of Gmina Przelewice, within Pyrzyce County, West Pomeranian Voivodeship, in north-western Poland.

For the history of the region, see History of Pomerania.
