= Żarnowo, Pyrzyce County =

Żarnowo
- Village
- Location within Poland
- Coordinates: 53°00′29″N 15°00′50″E
- Country: Poland
- Voivodeship: West Pomeranian
- County: Pyrzyce
- Gmina: Lipiany

Żarnowo [ʐarˈnɔvɔ] (German: Ernsthof) is a village in the administrative district of Gmina Lipiany, within Pyrzyce County, West Pomeranian Voivodeship, in north-western Poland.
