= Rutnica =

- Settlement
- Location within Poland
- Coordinates: 53°02′35″N 15°08′30″E
- Country: Poland
- Voivodeship: West Pomeranian
- County: Pyrzyce
- Gmina: Przelewice

Rutnica [rutˈnit͡sa] (German: Wilhelminenhof) is a settlement in the administrative district of Gmina Przelewice, within Pyrzyce County, West Pomeranian Voivodeship, in north-western Poland.

For the history of the region, see History of Pomerania.
