= Babbin =

Babbin is a surname. Notable people with the surname include:

- Jacqueline Babbin (1926–2001), American television writer, producer, and executive
- Jed Babbin (born 1950), American government official, author, and pundit

== See also ==
- Babbin, the former German name for the village of Babin, Pyrzyce County, in western Poland
- Habbin
