= Rosiny =

- Village
- Location within Poland
- Coordinates: 53°06′30″N 15°07′35″E
- Country: Poland
- Voivodeship: West Pomeranian
- County: Pyrzyce
- Gmina: Przelewice

Rosiny [rɔˈɕinɨ] (German: Rosenfelde) is a village in the administrative district of Gmina Przelewice, within Pyrzyce County, West Pomeranian Voivodeship, in north-western Poland.

For the history of the region, see History of Pomerania.
