= Maruszewo, West Pomeranian Voivodeship =

Maruszewo
- Village
- Location within Poland
- Coordinates: 53°2′N 14°44′E
- Country: Poland
- Voivodeship: West Pomeranian
- County: Pyrzyce
- Gmina: Kozielice

Maruszewo [maruˈʂɛvɔ] is a village in the administrative district of Gmina Kozielice, within Pyrzyce County, West Pomeranian Voivodeship, in north-western Poland. It lies approximately 15 km (9 mi) south-west of Pyrzyce and 44 km (27 mi) south of the regional capital Szczecin.

For the history of the region, see History of Pomerania.
