= Lubiatowo =

Lubiatowo may refer to the following places:

- Lubiatowo, Greater Poland Voivodeship (west-central Poland)
- Lubiatowo, Pomeranian Voivodeship (north Poland)
- Lubiatowo, West Pomeranian Voivodeship (north-west Poland)
