= Dołżyn =

- Village
- Location within Poland
- Coordinates: 53°03′24″N 14°54′57″E
- Country: Poland
- Voivodeship: West Pomeranian
- County: Pyrzyce
- Gmina: Lipiany

Dołżyn [ˈdɔu̯ʐɨn] is a village in the administrative district of Gmina Lipiany, within Pyrzyce County, West Pomeranian Voivodeship, in north-western Poland.

For the history of the region, see History of Pomerania.
