= Siemczyn =

- Village
- Location within Poland
- Coordinates: 53°05′42″N 14°48′14″E
- Country: Poland
- Voivodeship: West Pomeranian
- County: Pyrzyce
- Gmina: Kozielice

Siemczyn [ˈɕɛmt͡ʂɨn] is a village in the administrative district of Gmina Kozielice, within Pyrzyce County, West Pomeranian Voivodeship, in north-western Poland.

For the history of the region, see History of Pomerania.
