= Topolinek, West Pomeranian Voivodeship =

Topolinek
- Village
- Location within Poland
- Coordinates: 53°04′53″N 15°06′53″E
- Country: Poland
- Voivodeship: West Pomeranian
- County: Pyrzyce
- Gmina: Przelewice

Topolinek [tɔpɔˈlinɛk] (German: Ernestinenhof) is a village in the administrative district of Gmina Przelewice, within Pyrzyce County, West Pomeranian Voivodeship, in north-western Poland.

For the history of the region, see History of Pomerania.
