= Załęże, West Pomeranian Voivodeship =

Załęże
- Village
- Location within Poland
- Coordinates: 53°1′N 14°48′E
- Country: Poland
- Voivodeship: West Pomeranian
- County: Pyrzyce
- Gmina: Kozielice
- Population (approx.): 200

Załęże [zaˈwɛ̃ʐɛ] (German: Marienwerder) is a village in the administrative district of Gmina Kozielice, within Pyrzyce County, West Pomeranian Voivodeship, in north-western Poland. It lies approximately 10 km (6 mi) south of Kozielice, 15 km (9 mi) south-west of Pyrzyce, and 47 km (29 mi) south of the regional capital Szczecin.

For the history of the region, see History of Pomerania.

The village has an approximate population of 200.
