= Myśliborki =

- Village
- Location within Poland
- Coordinates: 53°06′01″N 15°01′42″E
- Country: Poland
- Voivodeship: West Pomeranian
- County: Pyrzyce
- Gmina: Przelewice

Myśliborki [mɨɕliˈbɔrki] (German: Mützelburg) is a village in the administrative district of Gmina Przelewice, within Pyrzyce County, West Pomeranian Voivodeship, in north-western Poland.

For the region's history, see History of Pomerania.
