= Tetyń =

- Village
- Location within Poland
- Coordinates: 53°2′N 14°46′E
- Country: Poland
- Voivodeship: West Pomeranian
- County: Pyrzyce
- Gmina: Kozielice

Tetyń [ˈtɛtɨɲ] (German: Beyersdorf) is a village in the administrative district of Gmina Kozielice, within Pyrzyce County, West Pomeranian Voivodeship, in north-western Poland. It lies approximately 14 km (9 mi) south-west of Pyrzyce and 45 km (28 mi) south of the regional capital Szczecin.

For the history of the region, see History of Pomerania.
