= Będzin, West Pomeranian Voivodeship =

Będzin
- Village
- Location within Poland
- Coordinates: 52°58′39.36″N 14°58′38.79″E
- Country: Poland
- Voivodeship: West Pomeranian
- County: Pyrzyce
- Gmina: Lipiany
- Village: Osetna
- Time zone: UTC+1 (CET)
  - Summer (DST): UTC+2 (CEST)
- Vehicle registration: ZPY

Będzin (Polish: [ˈbɛɲd͡ʑin]) is a przysiółek, part of the village of Osetna, in the administrative district of Gmina Lipiany, within Pyrzyce County, West Pomeranian Voivodeship, in north-western Poland.
