= Wymykowo =

- Settlement
- Location within Poland
- Coordinates: 53°10′08″N 15°09′03″E
- Country: Poland
- Voivodeship: West Pomeranian
- County: Pyrzyce
- Gmina: Przelewice

Wymykowo [vɨmɨˈkɔvɔ] (German: Jägerthal) is a settlement in the administrative district of Gmina Przelewice, within Pyrzyce County, West Pomeranian Voivodeship, in north-western Poland.

For the history of the region, see History of Pomerania.
