= Ukiernica =

- Village
- Location within Poland
- Coordinates: 53°10′20″N 15°05′04″E
- Country: Poland
- Voivodeship: West Pomeranian
- County: Pyrzyce
- Gmina: Przelewice

Ukiernica [ukʲɛrˈnit͡sa] (German: Ückerhof) is a village in the administrative district of Gmina Przelewice, within Pyrzyce County, West Pomeranian Voivodeship, in north-western Poland.

For the history of the region, see History of Pomerania.
