= Nowe Linie =

- Village
- Location within Poland
- Coordinates: 53°12′10″N 14°46′09″E
- Country: Poland
- Voivodeship: West Pomeranian
- County: Pyrzyce
- Gmina: Bielice

Nowe Linie [ˈnɔvɛ ˈliɲɛ] is a village in the administrative district of Gmina Bielice, within Pyrzyce County, West Pomeranian Voivodeship, in north-western Poland.

For the history of the region, see History of Pomerania.
