= Mielnik, West Pomeranian Voivodeship =

Mielnik
- Village
- Location within Poland
- Coordinates: 53°00′22″N 14°59′19″E
- Country: Poland
- Voivodeship: West Pomeranian
- County: Pyrzyce
- Gmina: Lipiany

Mielnik [ˈmjɛlnik] is a village in the administrative district of Gmina Lipiany, within Pyrzyce County, West Pomeranian Voivodeship, in north-western Poland.
