= Sokolniki, Pyrzyce County =

Sokolniki
- Village
- Location within Poland
- Coordinates: 53°02′05″N 14°59′22″E
- Country: Poland
- Voivodeship: West Pomeranian
- County: Pyrzyce
- Gmina: Lipiany

Sokolniki [sɔkɔlˈɲikʲi] is a village in the administrative district of Gmina Lipiany, within Pyrzyce County, West Pomeranian Voivodeship, in north-western Poland.
