= Lozice =

Lozice may refer to places:

== Czech Republic ==
- Lozice (Chrudim District), a municipality and village in the Pardubice Region

== Poland ==
- Łozice, Podlaskie Voivodeship (northeastern Poland)
- Łozice, Koszalin County in West Pomeranian Voivodeship (northwestern Poland)
- Łozice, Pyrzyce County in West Pomeranian Voivodeship (northwestern Poland)

== Slovenia ==
- Lozice, Vipava, a village in the Municipality of Vipava, southwestern Slovenia

== See also ==
- Lozica (disambiguation)
