= Mierzawy =

- Village
- Location within Poland
- Coordinates: 52°59′36″N 14°57′05″E
- Country: Poland
- Voivodeship: West Pomeranian
- County: Pyrzyce
- Gmina: Lipiany

Mierzawy [mjɛˈʐavɨ] is a village in the administrative district of Gmina Lipiany, within Pyrzyce County, West Pomeranian Voivodeship, in north-western Poland.
