= Czartowo, West Pomeranian Voivodeship =

Czartowo
- Settlement
- Location within Poland
- Coordinates: 53°07′44″N 15°07′27″E
- Country: Poland
- Voivodeship: West Pomeranian
- County: Pyrzyce
- Gmina: Przelewice

Czartowo [t͡ʂarˈtɔvɔ] (German: Teufelsdamm) is a settlement in the administrative district of Gmina Przelewice, within Pyrzyce County, West Pomeranian Voivodeship, in north-western Poland.

For the history of the region, see History of Pomerania.
