= Mielno Pyrzyckie =

- Village
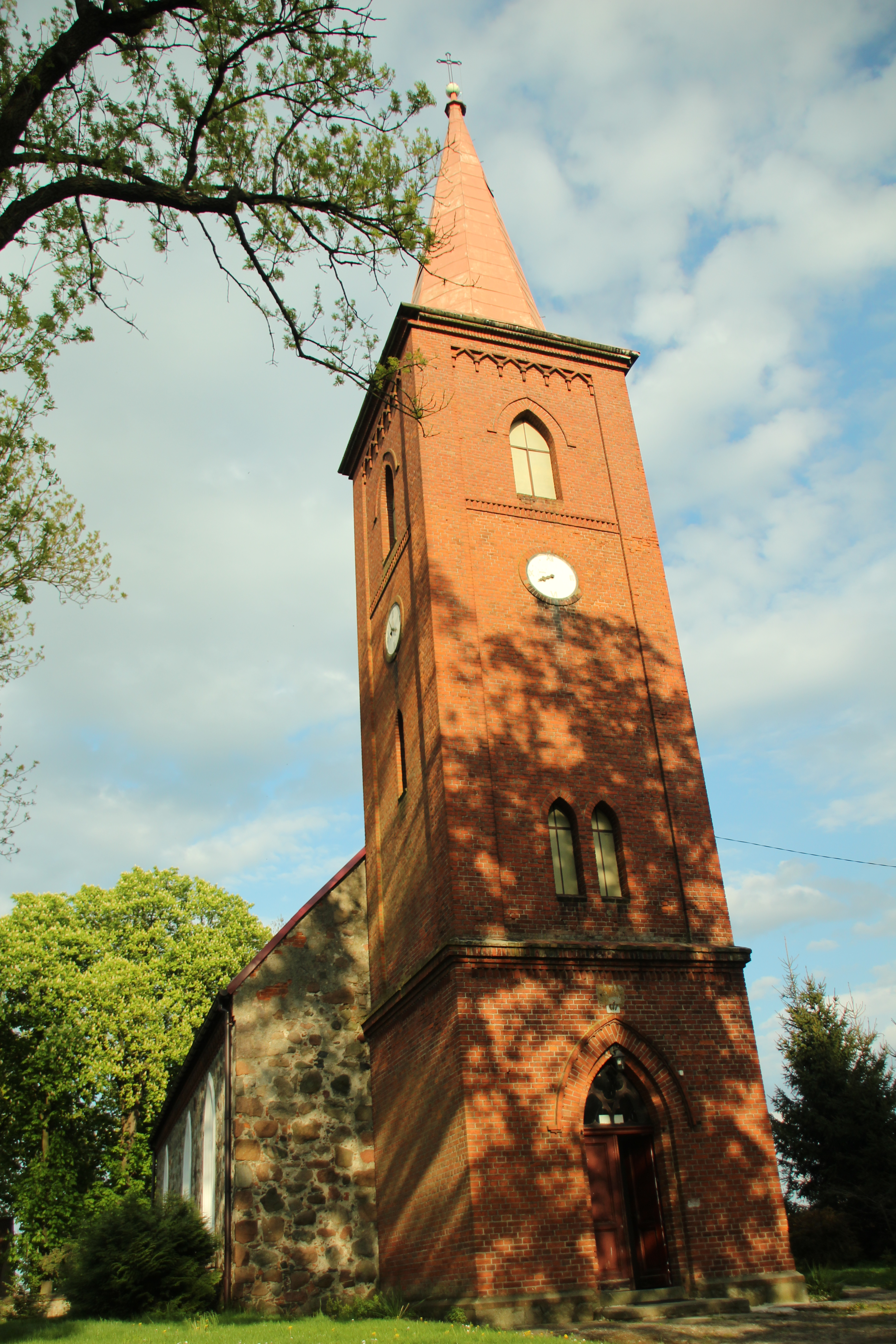
- Church in Mielno Pyrzyckie

- Location within Poland
- Coordinates: 53°05′33″N 14°46′20″E
- Country: Poland
- Voivodeship: West Pomeranian
- County: Pyrzyce
- Gmina: Kozielice

Mielno Pyrzyckie [ˈmjɛlnɔ pɨˈʐɨt͡skʲɛ] (German: Groß Möllen) is a village in the administrative district of Gmina Kozielice, within Pyrzyce County, West Pomeranian Voivodeship, in north-western Poland.

For the history of the region, see History of Pomerania.
