= Trzebórz-Podborze =

- Settlement
- Location within Poland
- Coordinates: 53°04′51″N 14°47′45″E
- Country: Poland
- Voivodeship: West Pomeranian
- County: Pyrzyce
- Gmina: Kozielice

Trzebórz-Podborze [ˈtʂɛbuʂ pɔdˈbɔʐɛ] is a settlement in the administrative district of Gmina Kozielice, within Pyrzyce County, West Pomeranian Voivodeship, in north-western Poland.

For the history of the region, see History of Pomerania.
