= Józefin, West Pomeranian Voivodeship =

Józefin
- Village
- Location within Poland
- Coordinates: 53°01′12″N 14°59′37″E
- Country: Poland
- Voivodeship: West Pomeranian
- County: Pyrzyce
- Gmina: Lipiany
- Postal code: 74-240

Józefin [juˈzɛfin] (German: Albertinenhof) is a village in the administrative district of Gmina Lipiany, within Pyrzyce County, West Pomeranian Voivodeship, in north-western Poland.
