= Lubiatowo, West Pomeranian Voivodeship =

Lubiatowo
- Village
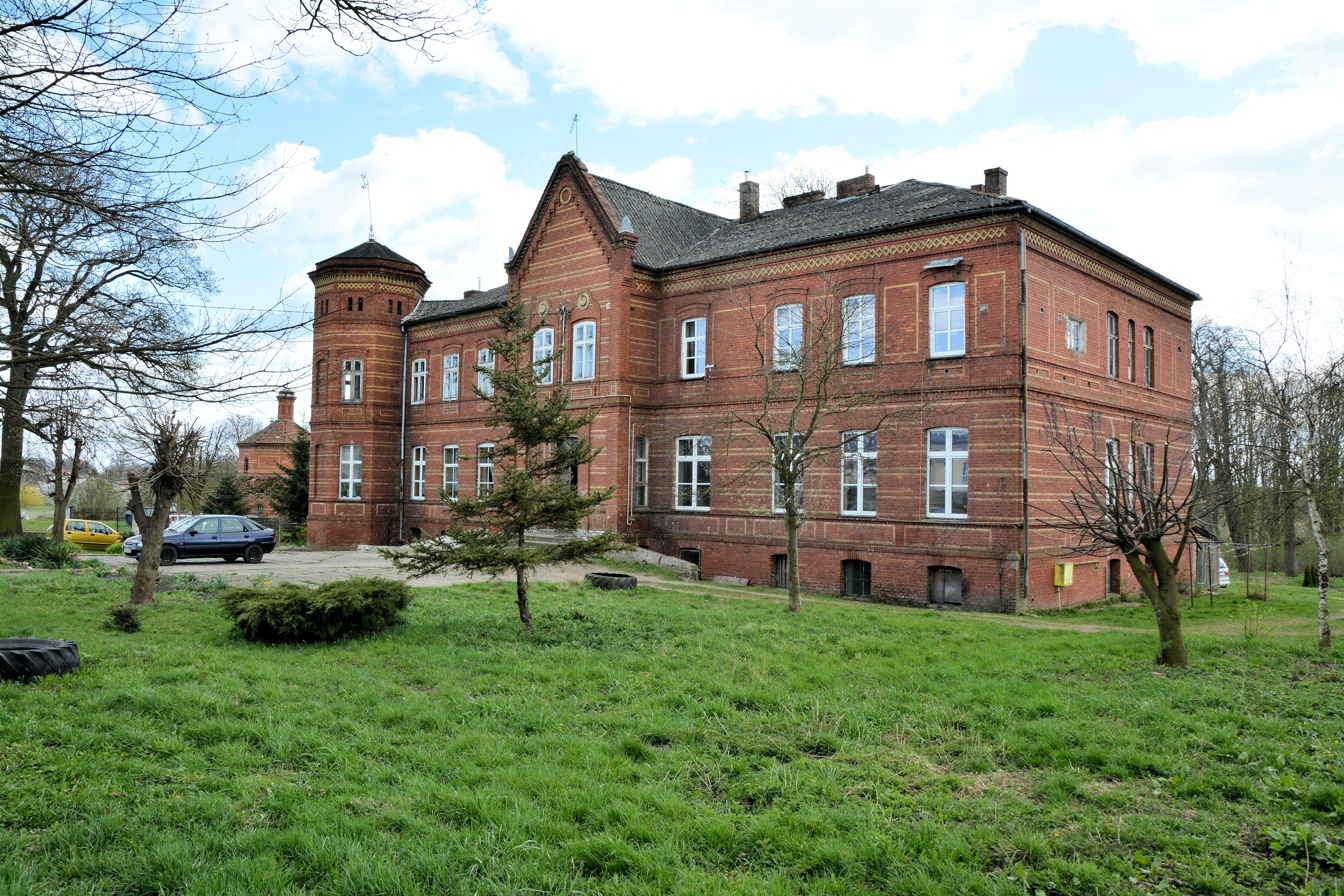
- Lubiatowo Palace

- Location within Poland
- Coordinates: 53°10′N 15°2′E
- Country: Poland
- Voivodeship: West Pomeranian
- County: Pyrzyce
- Gmina: Przelewice
- Time zone: UTC+1 (CET)
  - Summer (DST): UTC+2 (CEST)
- Vehicle registration: ZPY
- Website: http://www.lubiatowo.glt.pl

Lubiatowo ([lubjaˈtɔvɔ]; German: Lübtow) is a village in the administrative district of Gmina Przelewice, within Pyrzyce County, West Pomeranian Voivodeship, in north-western Poland. It lies approximately 8 km (5 mi) north-west of Przelewice, 11 km (7 mi) east of Pyrzyce, and 41 km (25 mi) south-east of the regional capital Szczecin.

It is located in the historic region of Pomerania.
