= Derczewko =

- Village
- Location within Poland
- Coordinates: 53°01′35″N 14°54′46″E
- Country: Poland
- Voivodeship: West Pomeranian
- County: Pyrzyce
- Gmina: Lipiany
- Time zone: UTC+01:00 (CET)
  - Summer (DST): UTC+02:00 (CEST)

Derczewko [dɛrˈt͡ʂɛfkɔ] is a village in the administrative district of Gmina Lipiany, within Pyrzyce County, West Pomeranian Voivodeship, in north-western Poland.
