= Laskowo, West Pomeranian Voivodeship =

Laskowo
- Village
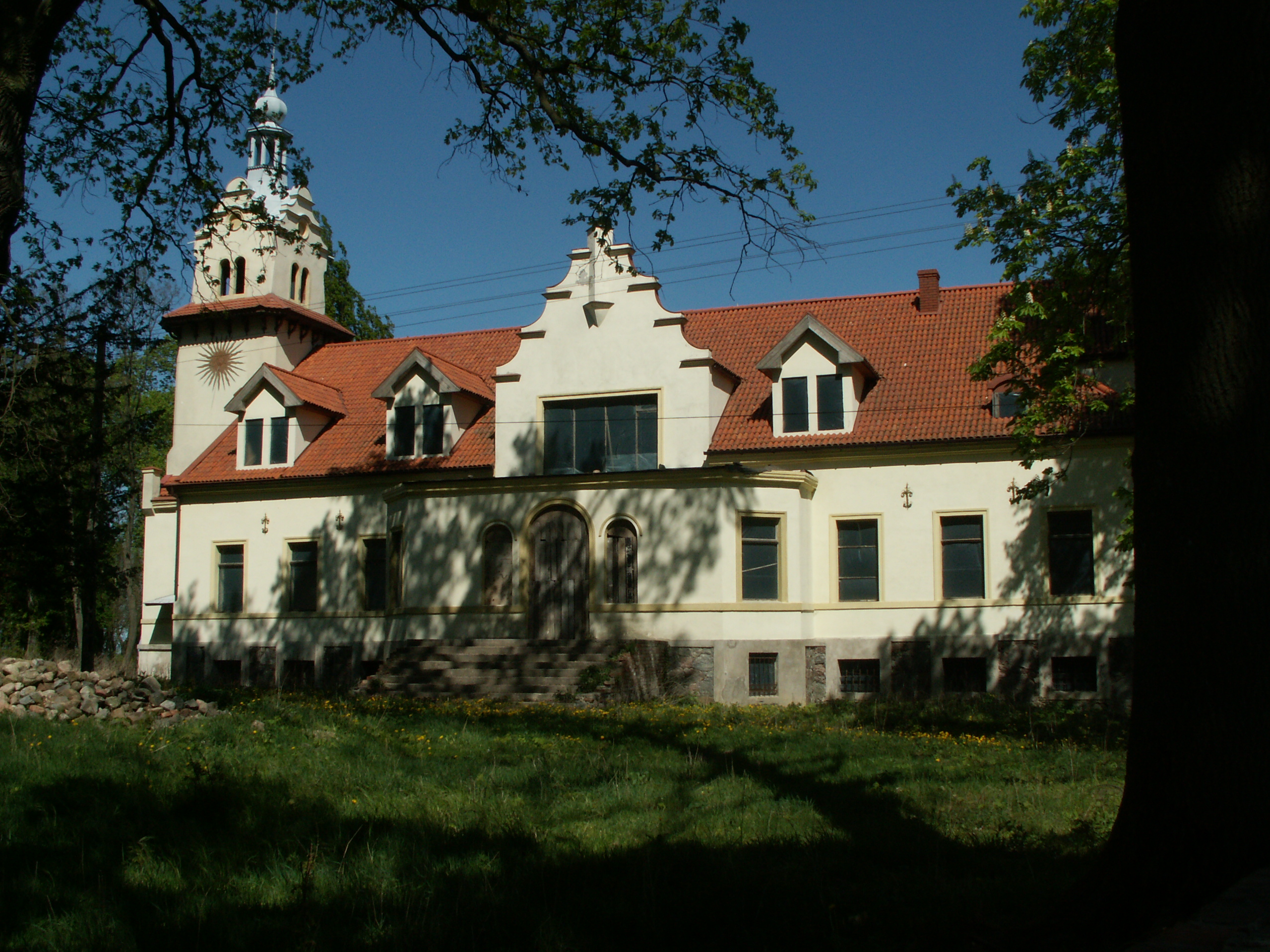
- Laskowo Palace

- Location within Poland
- Coordinates: 53°04′18″N 15°09′45″E
- Country: Poland
- Voivodeship: West Pomeranian
- County: Pyrzyce
- Gmina: Przelewice

Laskowo [lasˈkɔvɔ] (German: Groß Latzkow) is a village in the administrative district of Gmina Przelewice, within Pyrzyce County, West Pomeranian Voivodeship, in north-western Poland.

For the history of the region, see History of Pomerania.
