= Karsko, Pyrzyce County =

Karsko
- Village
- Location within Poland
- Coordinates: 53°08′55″N 15°07′11″E
- Country: Poland
- Voivodeship: West Pomeranian
- County: Pyrzyce
- Gmina: Przelewice

Karsko [ˈkarskɔ] (German: Schöningsburg) is a village in the administrative district of Gmina Przelewice, within Pyrzyce County, West Pomeranian Voivodeship, in north-western Poland.

For the history of the region, see History of Pomerania.
