= Mielęcinek =

- Village
- Location within Poland
- Coordinates: 53°03′36″N 14°54′39″E
- Country: Poland
- Voivodeship: West Pomeranian
- County: Pyrzyce
- Gmina: Lipiany
- Time zone: UTC+1 (CET)
  - Summer (DST): UTC+2 (CEST)
- Vehicle registration: ZPY

Mielęcinek [mjɛlɛnˈt͡ɕinɛk] is a village in the administrative district of Gmina Lipiany, within Pyrzyce County, West Pomeranian Voivodeship, in north-western Poland.
