= Radlice, Pyrzyce County =

Radlice
- Settlement
- Location within Poland
- Coordinates: 53°04′02″N 15°07′43″E
- Country: Poland
- Voivodeship: West Pomeranian
- County: Pyrzyce
- Gmina: Przelewice

Radlice [raˈdlit͡sɛ] (German: Freiburg) is a settlement in the administrative district of Gmina Przelewice, within Pyrzyce County, West Pomeranian Voivodeship, in north-western Poland.

For the history of the region, see History of Pomerania.
