= Przydarłów =

- Village
- Location within Poland
- Coordinates: 53°5′N 14°50′E
- Country: Poland
- Voivodeship: West Pomeranian
- County: Pyrzyce
- Gmina: Kozielice

Przydarłów [pʂɨˈdarwuf] (German: Brederlow) is a village in the administrative district of Gmina Kozielice, within Pyrzyce County, West Pomeranian Voivodeship, in north-western Poland. It lies approximately 7 km (4 mi) south-west of Pyrzyce and 41 km (25 mi) south-east of the regional capital Szczecin.

For the history of the region, see History of Pomerania.
