= Czajczyn =

- Village
- Country: Poland
- Voivodeship: West Pomeranian
- County: Pyrzyce
- Gmina: Lipiany
- Time zone: UTC+01:00 (CET)
  - Summer (DST): UTC+02:00 (CEST)

Czajczyn [ˈt͡ʂai̯t͡ʂɨn] is a village in the administrative district of Gmina Lipiany, within Pyrzyce County, West Pomeranian Voivodeship, in north-western Poland.

For the history of the region, see History of Pomerania.
