= Rokity, West Pomeranian Voivodeship =

Rokity
- Village
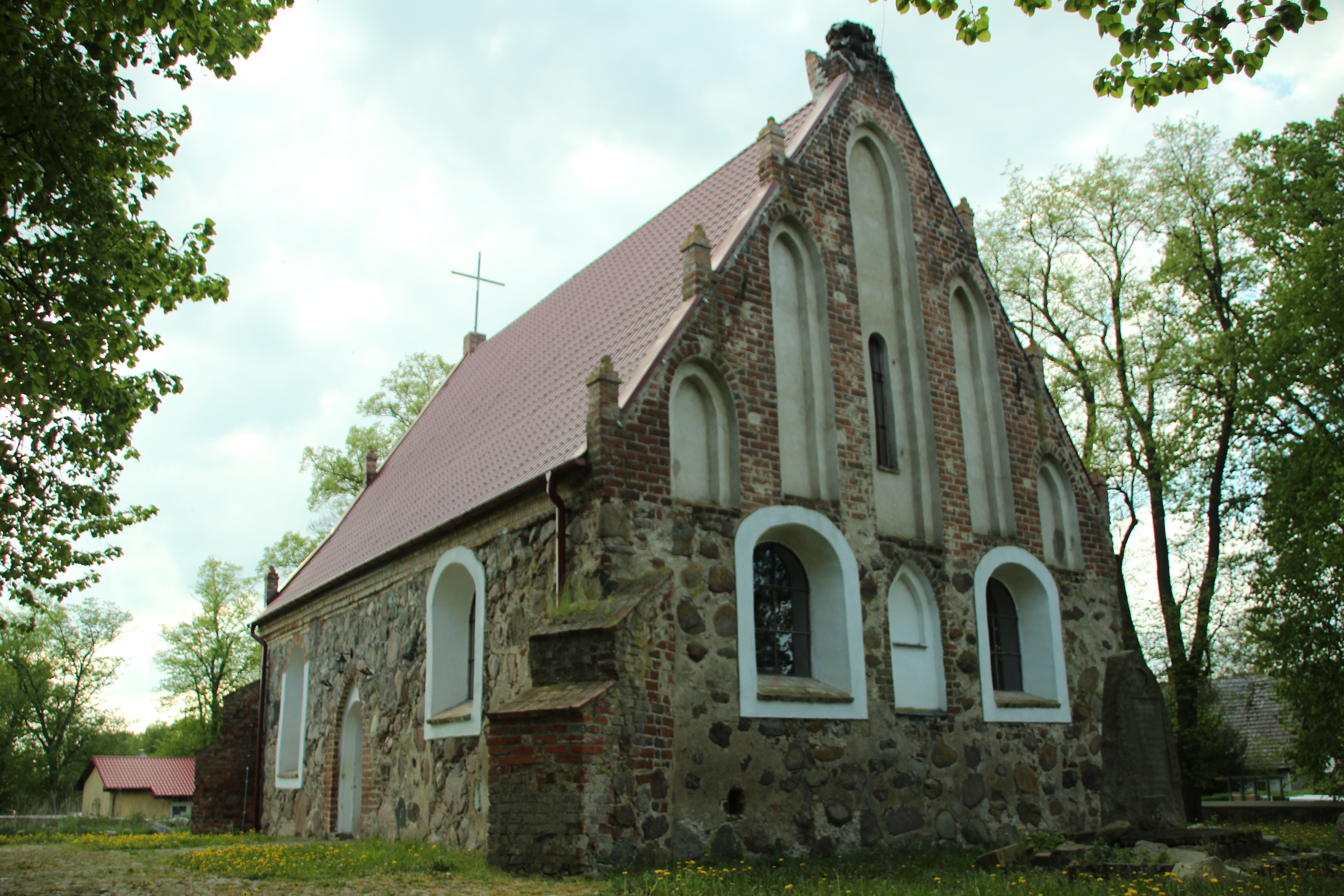
- Church in Rokity

- Location within Poland
- Coordinates: 53°07′51″N 14°49′53″E
- Country: Poland
- Voivodeship: West Pomeranian
- County: Pyrzyce
- Gmina: Kozielice

Rokity [rɔˈkitɨ] (German: Rackitt) is a village in the administrative district of Gmina Kozielice, within Pyrzyce County, West Pomeranian Voivodeship, in north-western Poland.

For the history of the region, see History of Pomerania.
