= Gmina Lipiany =

Gmina Lipiany Lipiany Commune
- Gmina
- Flag Coat of arms
- Interactive map of Gmina Lipiany
- Coordinates (Lipiany): 53°0′1″N 14°57′31″E
- Country: Poland
- Voivodeship: West Pomeranian
- County: Pyrzyce
- Seat: Lipiany

Area
  - Total: 94.62 km^{2} (36.53 sq mi)

Population (2006)
  - Total: 6,033
  - Density: 63.76/km^{2} (165.1/sq mi)
  - Urban: 4,124
  - Rural: 1,909
- Website: http://www.lipiany.pl/

Gmina Lipiany is an urban-rural gmina (administrative district) in Pyrzyce County, West Pomeranian Voivodeship, in north-western Poland. Its seat is the town of Lipiany, which lies approximately 16 kilometres (10 mi) south of Pyrzyce and 53 km (33 mi) south-east of the regional capital Szczecin.

The gmina covers an area of 94.62 square kilometres (36.5 sq mi), and as of 2006 its total population is 6,033 (out of which the population of Lipiany amounts to 4,124, and the population of the rural part of the gmina is 1,909).

== Villages ==
Apart from the town of Lipiany, Gmina Lipiany contains the villages and settlements of Batowo, Będzin, Brzostowo, Czajczyn, Dębiec, Derczewko, Dołżyn, Dzieżno, Głębokie, Jarzębnik, Jedlice, Józefin, Krasne, Łasiczyn, Łosiniec, Małcz, Miedzyn, Mielęcinek, Mielnik, Mierzawy, Mironów, Mokronos, Nowice, Osetna, Piaśnik, Połczyno, Przywodzie, Skrzynka, Sokolniki, Sulino, Świerszczyki, Wądół, Wielice, Wojnowice, Wołczyn and Żarnowo.

== Neighbouring gminas ==
Gmina Lipiany is bordered by the gminas of Barlinek, Myślibórz, Przelewice and Pyrzyce.
