= Jedlice, West Pomeranian Voivodeship =

Jedlice
- Village
- Location within Poland
- Coordinates: 52°59′56″N 15°01′54″E
- Country: Poland
- Voivodeship: West Pomeranian
- County: Pyrzyce
- Gmina: Lipiany

Jedlice [jɛˈdlit͡sɛ] is a village in the administrative district of Gmina Lipiany, within Pyrzyce County, West Pomeranian Voivodeship, in north-western Poland.
