= Przelewice Arboretum =

Botanical garden in Przelewice, Poland

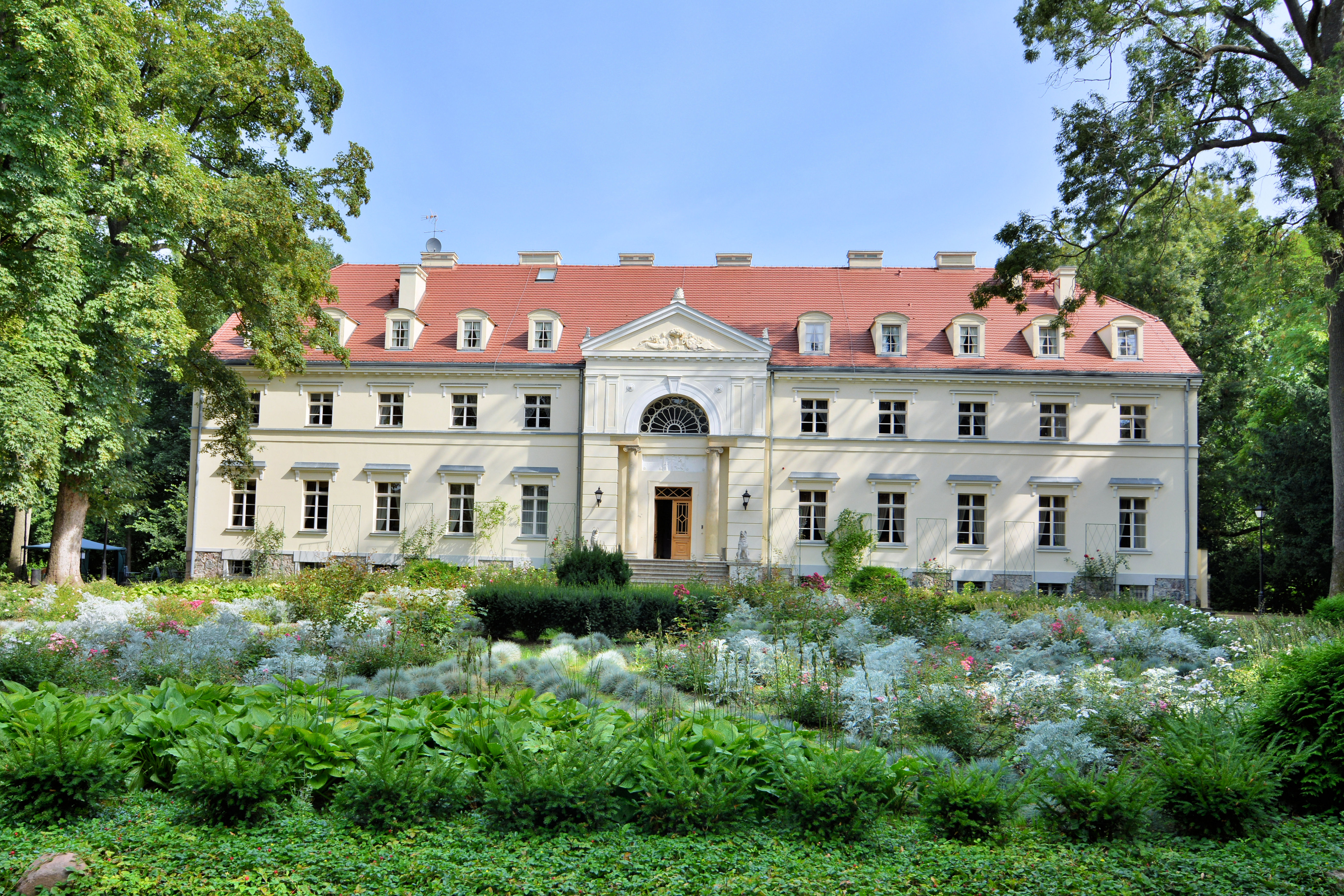
- Palace in Dendrological Garden
- Interactive map of Przelewice Arboretum
- Location: Przelewice, Pyrzyce County, Poland
- Coordinates: 53°6′40.63″N 5°4′56.47″E
- Area: 30 hectares (74 acres)
- Created: 1933
- Open: Yes
- Website: ogrodprzelewice.pl

The Przelewice Arboretum (Polish: Ogród Dendrologiczny w Przelewicach) is a botanical garden, founded in 1933 in Przelewice, Pyrzyce County. It is located to south-east from Pyrzyce, 60 km from the center of the city of Szczecin. The garden occupies 45 hectares.

One of the largest trees in the garden is monumental european white—elm. Its girth was 607 cm and height — 31 m (in 2012).

The identification code of the Dendrological Garden in Przelewice as a member of the Botanic Gardens Conservation International (BGCI), as well as the initials of its herbarium is PRZEL.

Dendrological Garden in Przelewice is a member of the Network of Botanic Gardens in the Baltic Sea region.

== Collection ==
Cultivated taxa over 1000. Special collections: Picea, Chamaecyparis, Juniperus, Abies, Thuja, Taxus, Acer, Malus, Magnolia, Betula, Cotoneaster.

== Gallery ==
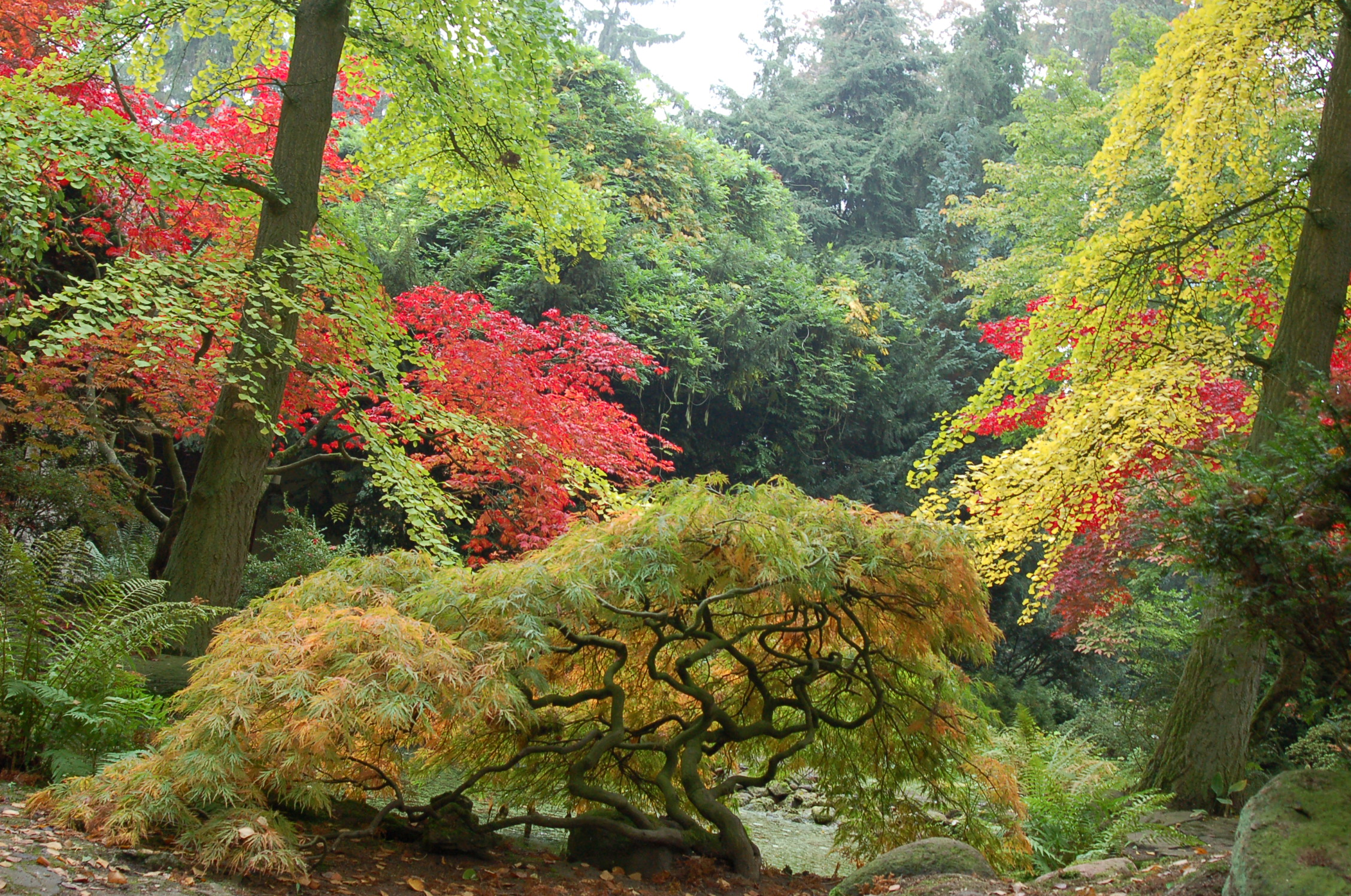
Japanese Garden

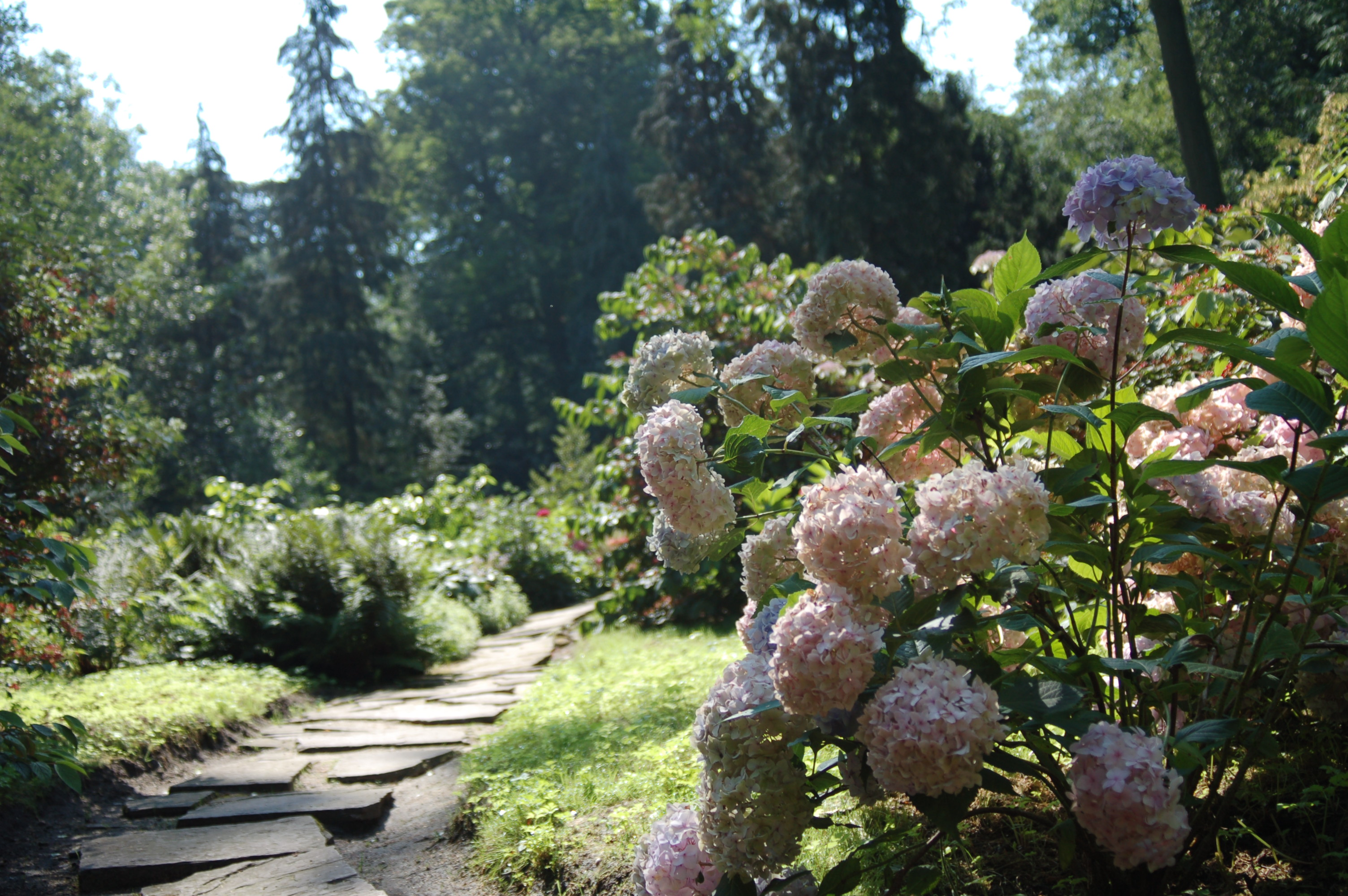
Path in the Garden

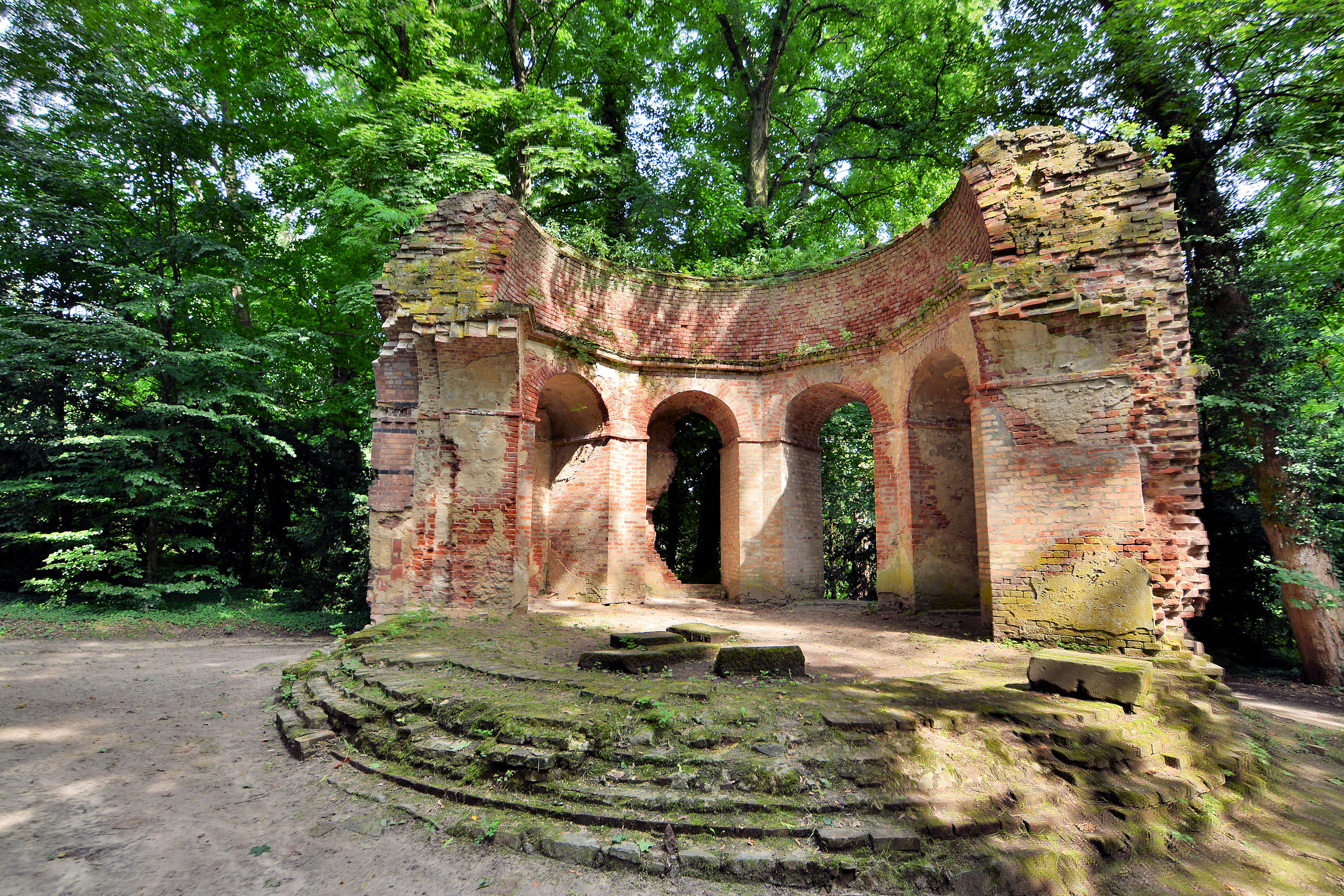
The ruins of the mausoleum

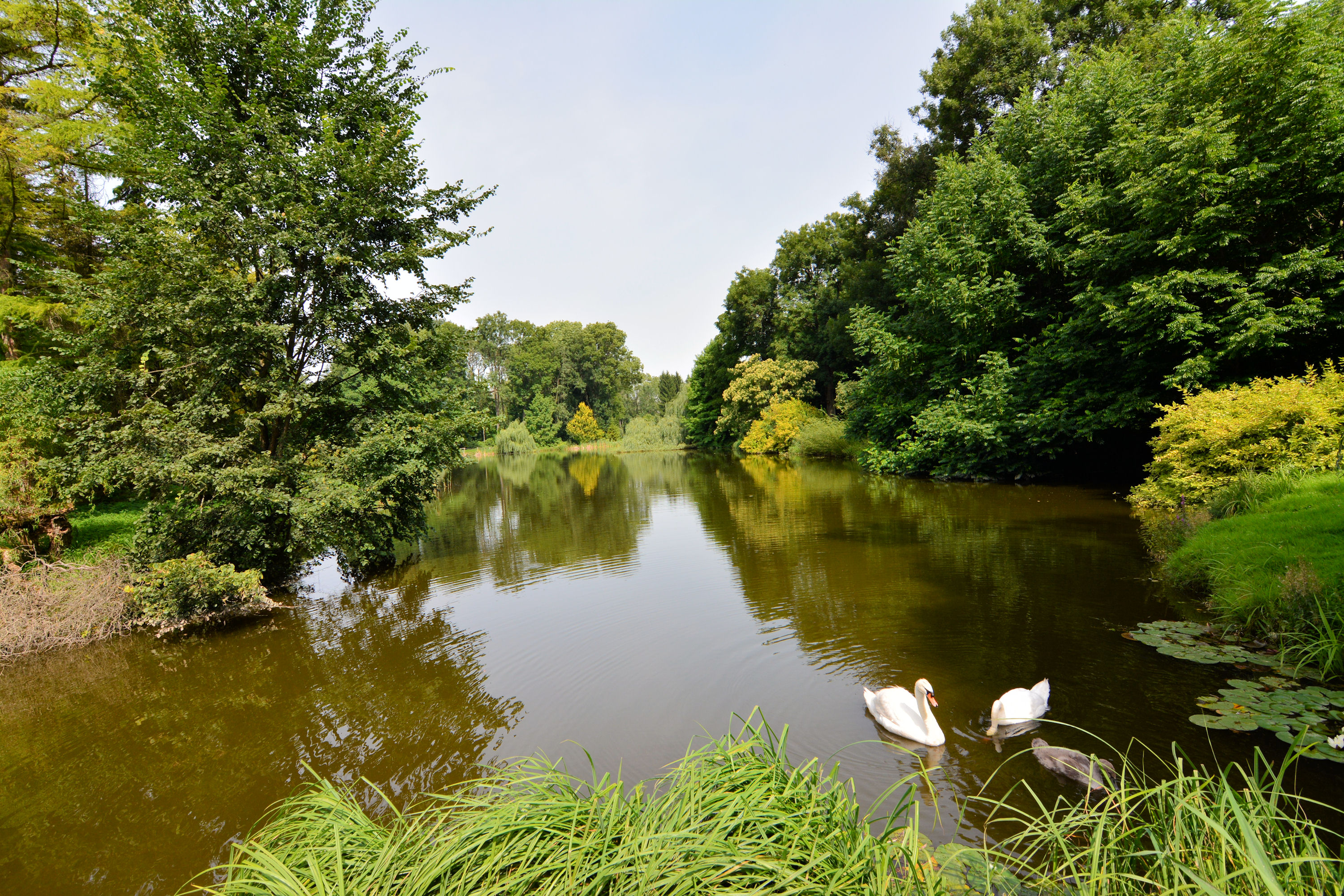
Pond

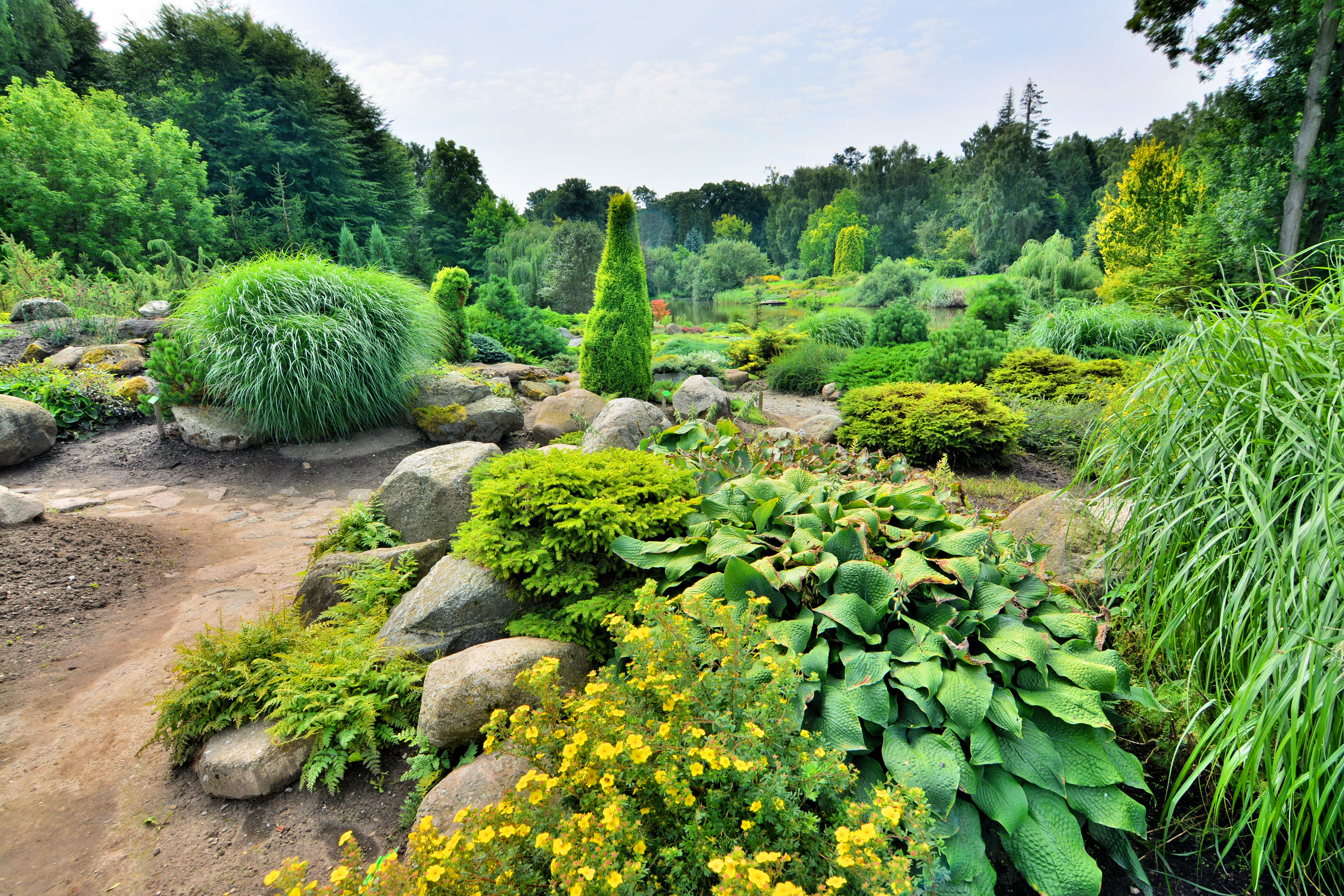
The rock garden

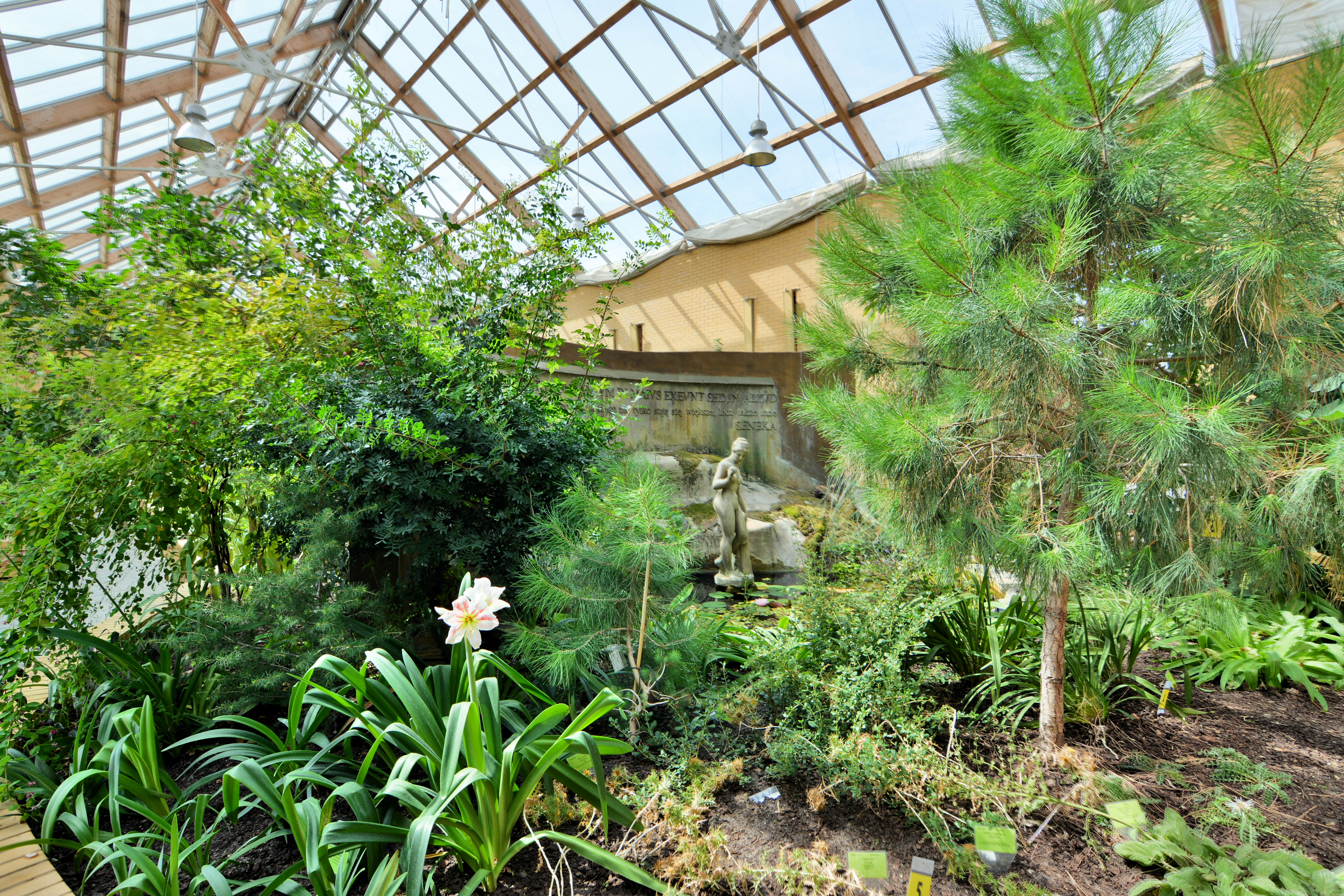
Orangery
