= Alexandra (1914 film) =

1915 film by Curt A. Stark

- Directed by: Curt A. Stark
- Starring: Henny Porten
- Release date: 1914
- Country: Germany
- Language: Silent

Alexandra is a German silent film drama from 1914. It was directed by Curt A. Stark and stars his wife Henny Porten in the lead role. It is based a novel by Richard Voss

== Plot ==
Alexandra, a homeless young woman, meets Count Eberti. When she gets from him the security she had always yearned for, she becomes his lover. But his family detests her for being a commoner. One day, on his mother's exhortation, the Count leaves Alexandra when she is pregnant with his child. Unable to pay her apartment rent she is thrown out with her newborn. On a cold night, Alexandra goes to sleep hugging her child tight.

When she wakes up, there is a crowd around him, beating her. Alexandra's tight clasp had apparently suffocated her infant. She is arrested and convicted as a murderer and received five years in prison. Once she is released, Alexandra only has revenge on her mind, against the man wo took everything from him.

Alexandra ingratiates herself with the Count, who realizes he still has feelings for her. Even his mother is kind and Alexandra is let back into the Count's life. With this change in the family's attitude, Alexandra also is letting go of her plan for revenge. Just then, news of her prison past somehow becomes known. To spare her lover the shame, Alexandra takes her own life.

== Cast ==
- Henny Porten: Alexandra
- Friedrich Fehér: Count Erwin Eberti
- Henny Steinmann: Countess Eberti, his mother
- Ernst Reschke: Anton

== Production ==
The film is based on a play of the same name by Richard Voss.

== Recent screenings ==
The film was screened at the 1986 Berlinale as part of a general retrospective of German film.
