= Łozice, Pyrzyce County =

Łozice
- Village
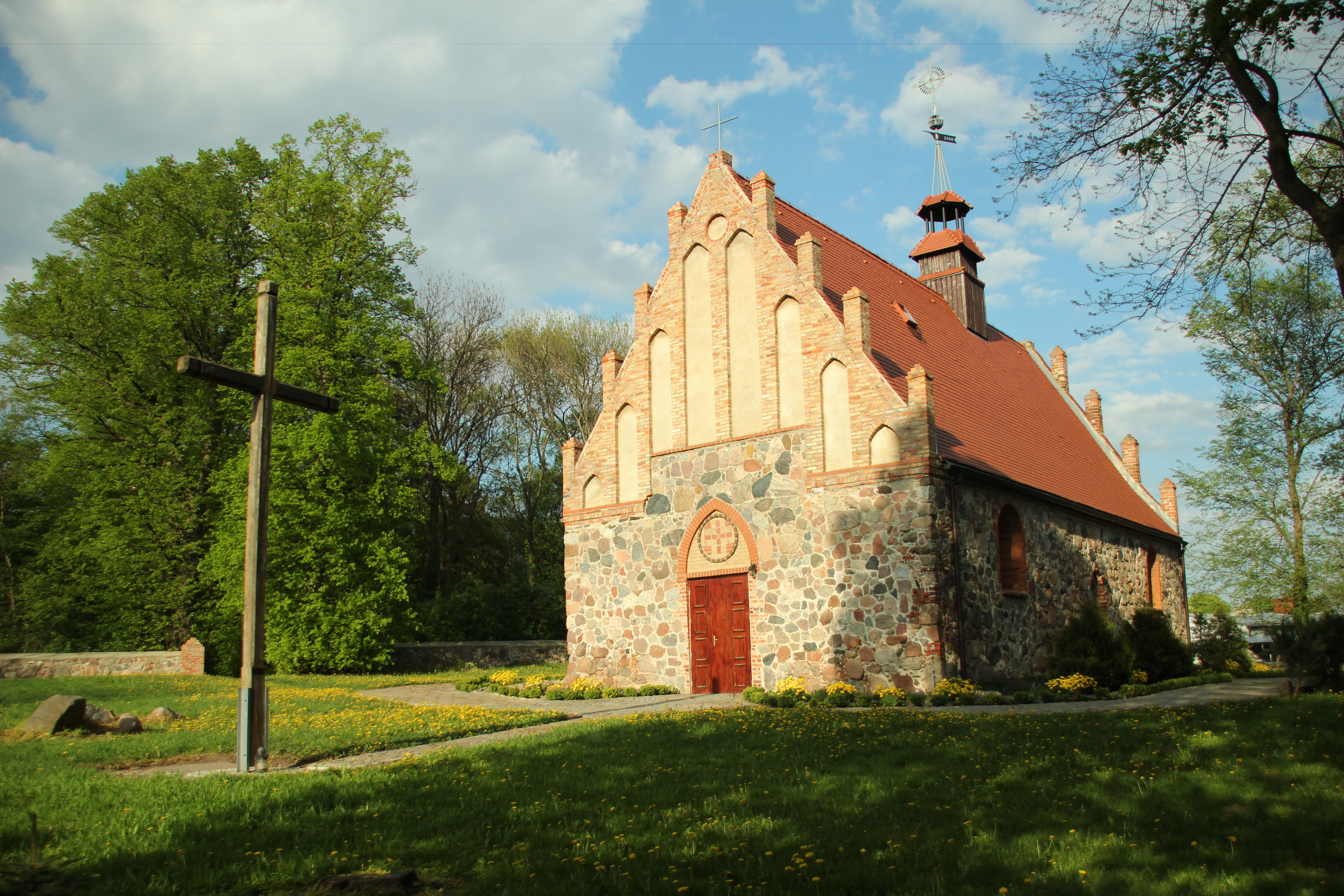

- Location within Poland
- Coordinates: 53°07′34″N 14°47′25″E
- Country: Poland
- Voivodeship: West Pomeranian
- County: Pyrzyce
- Gmina: Kozielice

Łozice [wɔˈʑit͡sɛ] (formerly German Loist) is a village in the administrative district of Gmina Kozielice, within Pyrzyce County, West Pomeranian Voivodeship, in north-western Poland.

For the history of the region, see History of Pomerania.
