= Babin, Pyrzyce County =

Babin
- Village
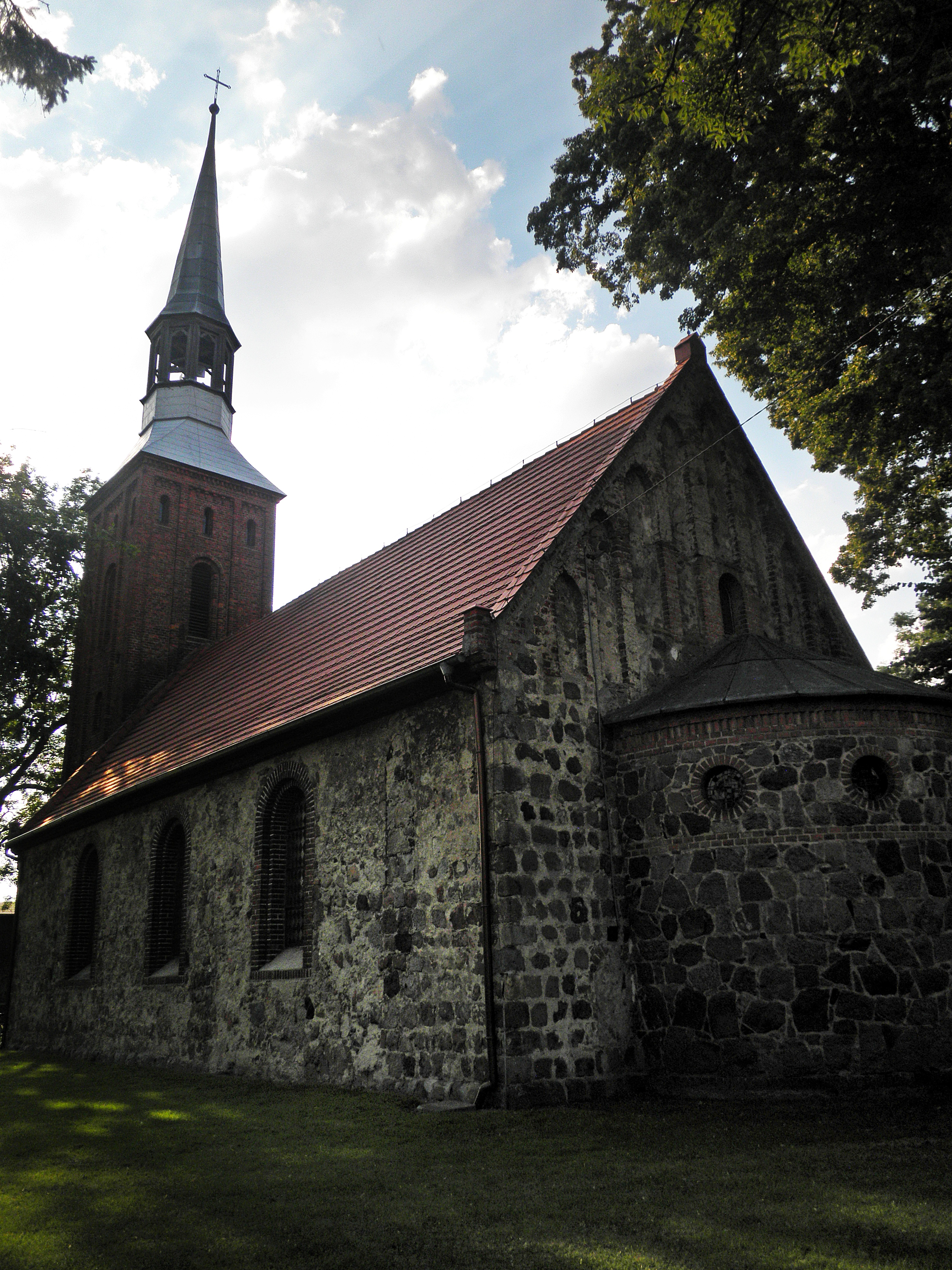

- Location within Poland
- Coordinates: 53°14′0″N 14°44′3″E
- Country: Poland
- Voivodeship: West Pomeranian
- County: Pyrzyce
- Gmina: Bielice
- Population: 290

Babin [ˈbabin] (German Babbin) is a village in the administrative district of Gmina Bielice, within Pyrzyce County, West Pomeranian Voivodeship, in north-western Poland.

The village has a population of 290.
