= Gmina Kozielice =

Gmina Kozielice Kozielice Commune
- Gmina
- Coat of arms
- Interactive map of Gmina Kozielice
- Coordinates (Kozielice): 53°6′N 14°49′E
- Country: Poland
- Voivodeship: West Pomeranian
- County: Pyrzyce
- Seat: Kozielice

Area
  - Total: 94.51 km^{2} (36.49 sq mi)

Population (2006)
  - Total: 2,611
  - Density: 27.63/km^{2} (71.55/sq mi)
- Website: http://www.kozielice.com.pl/

Gmina Kozielice is a rural gmina (administrative district) in Pyrzyce County, West Pomeranian Voivodeship, in north-western Poland. Its seat is the village of Kozielice, which lies approximately 6 kilometres (4 mi) south-west of Pyrzyce and 39 km (24 mi) south-east of the regional capital Szczecin.

The gmina covers an area of 94.51 square kilometres (36.5 sq mi), and as of 2006 its total population is 2,611.

== Villages ==
Gmina Kozielice contains the villages and settlements of Czarnowo, Kozielice, Łozice, Maruszewo, Mielno Pyrzyckie, Przydarłów, Rokity, Siemczyn, Tetyń, Trzebórz, Trzebórz-Podborze, Zadeklino and Załęże.

== Neighbouring gminas ==
Gmina Kozielice is bordered by the gminas of Banie, Bielice, Myślibórz and Pyrzyce.
