= Gmina Bielice =

Gmina Bielice Bielice Commune
- Gmina
- Flag Coat of arms
- Interactive map of Gmina Bielice
- Coordinates (Bielice): 53°11′58″N 14°43′43″E
- Country: Poland
- Voivodeship: West Pomeranian
- County: Pyrzyce
- Seat: Bielice

Area
  - Total: 84.12 km^{2} (32.48 sq mi)

Population (2006)
  - Total: 2,930
  - Density: 34.8/km^{2} (90.2/sq mi)
- Website: http://www.bielice.com.pl/

Gmina Bielice is a rural gmina (administrative district) in Pyrzyce County, West Pomeranian Voivodeship, in north-western Poland. Its seat is the village of Bielice, which lies approximately 13 kilometres (8 mi) north-west of Pyrzyce and 26 km (16 mi) south of the regional capital Szczecin.

The gmina covers an area of 84.12 square kilometres (32.5 sq mi), and as of 2006 its total population is 2,930.

== Villages ==
Gmina Bielice contains the villages and settlements of Babin, Babinek, Bielice, Chabówko, Chabowo, Linie, Nowe Chrapowo, Nowe Linie, Parsów, Stare Chrapowo and Swochowo.

== Neighbouring gminas ==
Gmina Bielice is bordered by the gminas of Banie, Gryfino, Kozielice, Pyrzyce and Stare Czarnowo.
