= Richard Voss =

German dramatist and novelist (1851–1918)

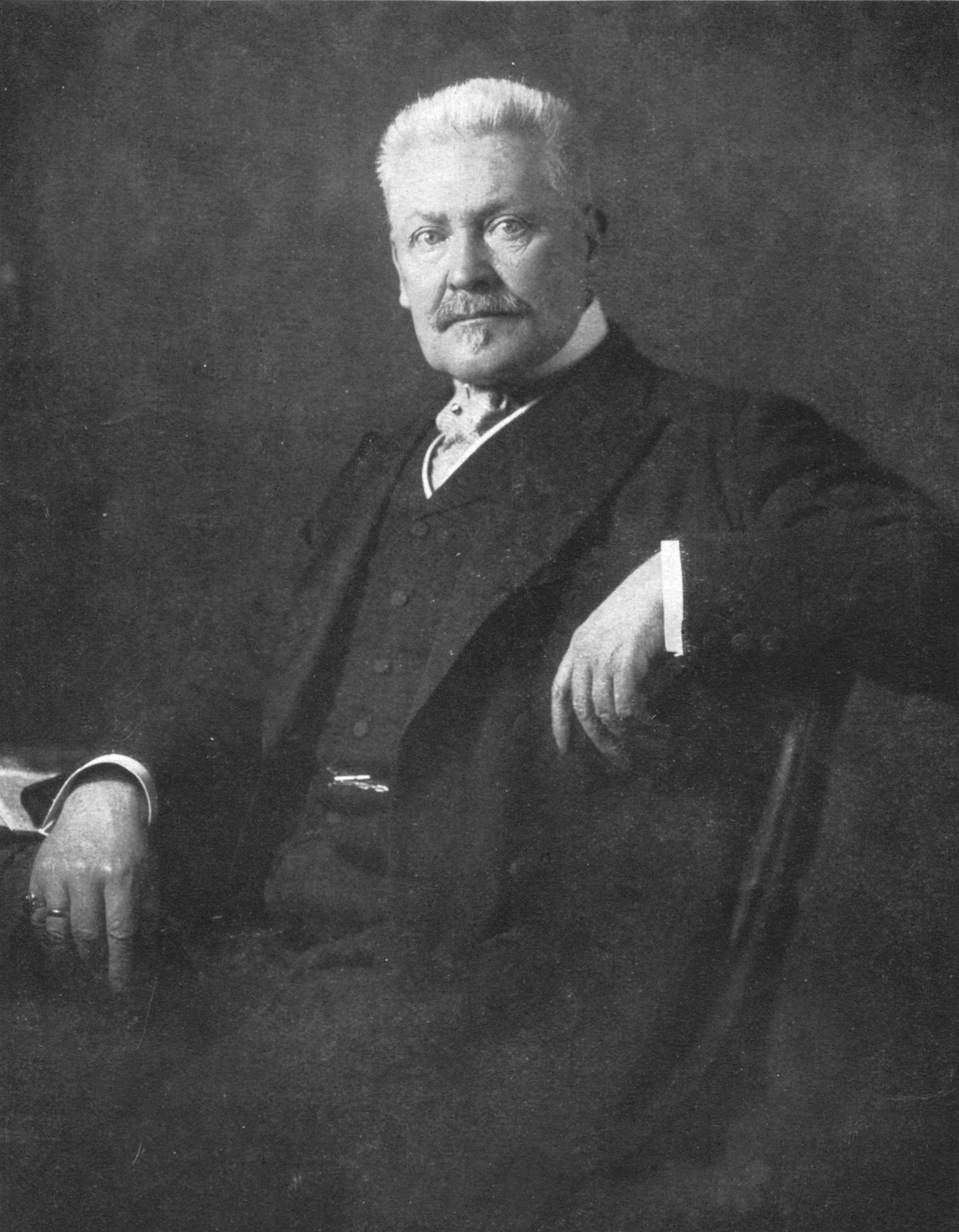
- Voss in 1908
- Born: 2 September 1851; Neu-Grape, Kingdom of Prussia
- Died: 10 June 1918 (aged 66); Berchtesgaden, German Empire
- Education: University of Jena; Ludwig-Maximilians-Universität München
- Occupations: Prose, Dramaturgy
- Writing career
- Genre: Drama
- Literary movement: Realism

Richard Voss (2 September 1851 – 10 June 1918) was a German dramatist and novelist. In standard German orthography, his surname is printed as Voß.

== Biography ==
Voss was born on 2 September 1851, at Neu-Grape, the son of a country squire.

Though intended for the life of a country gentleman, he showed no inclination for outdoor life, and on his return from the war of 1870-71, in which he was wounded, he studied philosophy at the University of Jena and the Ludwig-Maximilians-Universität München, and then settled at Berchtesgaden. In 1884, Charles Alexander, Grand Duke of Saxe-Weimar-Eisenach, appointed Voss as librarian of the Wartburg, but he later resigned the post, due to ill health.

Voss spent 25 years of his life living at Frascati, near Rome, where he wrote many of his novels and plays. He was granted honorary citizenship of the town.

== Main works ==
=== Plays ===
- Savonarola (1878)
- Magda (1879)
- Die Patricierin, a classical drama, which won the Schiller prize in 1896 (The Patrician Dame; 1880)
- Pater Modestus, dealing with the problem of religion (1882)
- Der Mohr des Zaren (1883)
- Unehrlich Volk (1885)
- Alexandra (1888)
- Eva (1889)
- Wehe dem Besiegten (Woe to the Vanquished; 1889)
- Die neue Zeit (1891)
- Schuldig (1892)
- Lebenskünstler (1902)

=== Novels ===
- San Sebastian (1883)
- Der Sohn der Volskerin (1885)
- Die Sabinerin, remarkable for its beautiful descriptions of Italian country (1888)
- Der Mönch von Berchtesgaden (1891)
- Villa Falconieri, the story of a successful poet who lost confidence in his powers (1896)
- Der neue Gott (1898)
- Die Rächerin (1899)
- Amata, a story of Rome in Nero's time (1901)
- Römisches Fieber (1902)
- Allerlei Erlebtes (1902)
- Die Leute von Valdars (1902)
- Die Schuldige, novel in two parts (1907)
- Alpentragödie (1909)
- Zwei Menschen (1911)

== Filmography ==
- Eva, directed by Curt A. Stark (1913)
- Schuldig, directed by Hans Oberländer (1913)
- Alexandra, directed by Curt A. Stark (1914)
- Perjury, directed by Harry F. Millarde (1921)
- Die Schuldige, directed by Fred Sauer (1921)
- Two People, directed by Hanns Schwarz (1924)
- Ein Lebenskünstler, directed by Holger-Madsen (1925)
- Alpine Tragedy, directed by Robert Land (1927)
- Guilty, directed by Johannes Meyer (1928)
- Villa Falconieri, directed by Richard Oswald (1928)
- Two People, directed by Erich Waschneck (1930)
- Two People, directed by Paul May (1952)
