= Wołczyn, West Pomeranian Voivodeship =

Wołczyn
- Village
- Location within Poland
- Coordinates: 53°04′05″N 14°57′57″E
- Country: Poland
- Voivodeship: West Pomeranian
- County: Pyrzyce
- Gmina: Lipiany
- Time zone: UTC+1 (CET)
  - Summer (DST): UTC+2 (CEST)
- Vehicle registration: ZPY

Wołczyn [ˈvɔu̯t͡ʂɨn] is a village in the administrative district of Gmina Lipiany, within Pyrzyce County, West Pomeranian Voivodeship, in north-western Poland.

Between 1975 and 1998, it was administratively located in the Szczecin Voivodeship.
