= Lozitsa =

Lozitsa may refer to the following places of Bulgaria:

- Lozitsa, Burgas Province, a village
- Lozitsa, Pleven Province, a village in Nikopol Municipality
- Lozitsa, a Bulgarian wine region

== See also ==
- Lozica (disambiguation) (pronounced Lozitsa)
- Loznitsa
