= Habbin =

Habbin is a surname. Notable people with the surname include:

- David Habbin, English opera singer
- Dick Habbin (born 1949), English footballer and manager

== See also ==
- Babbin
