= Lozica =

Lozica may refer to:

- Lozica, Croatia, a village in Croatia
- Lozica, Mališevo, a village in Kosovo
- Boško Lozica, Yugoslav water polo player

== See also ==
- Lozitsa (disambiguation)
- Lozice (disambiguation)
