= Gmina Przelewice =

Gmina Przelewice Przelewice Commune
- Gmina
- Coat of arms
- Interactive map of Gmina Przelewice
- Coordinates (Przelewice): 53°6′12″N 15°4′42″E
- Country: Poland
- Voivodeship: West Pomeranian
- County: Pyrzyce
- Seat: Przelewice

Area
  - Total: 162.20 km^{2} (62.63 sq mi)

Population (2006)
  - Total: 5,254
  - Density: 32.39/km^{2} (83.90/sq mi)
- Website: http://www.przelewice.pl/

Gmina Przelewice is a rural gmina (administrative district) in Pyrzyce County, West Pomeranian Voivodeship, in north-western Poland. Its seat is the village of Przelewice, which lies approximately 14 kilometres (9 mi) east of Pyrzyce and 48 km (30 mi) south-east of the regional capital Szczecin.

The gmina covers an area of 162.20 square kilometres (62.6 sq mi), and as of 2006 its total population is 5,254.

== Villages ==
Gmina Przelewice contains the villages and settlements of Bylice, Czartowo, Gardziec, Jesionowo, Karsko, Kłodzino, Kluki, Kosin, Laskowo, Lubiatowo, Lucin, Myśliborki, Oćwieka, Płońsko, Przelewice, Przywodzie, Radlice, Rosiny, Rutnica, Ślazowo, Topolinek, Ukiernica, Wołdowo, Wymykowo and Żuków.

== Neighbouring gminas ==
Gmina Przelewice is bordered by the gminas of Barlinek, Dolice, Lipiany, Pyrzyce and Warnice.
