= Kozielice, Pyrzyce County =

Kozielice
- Village
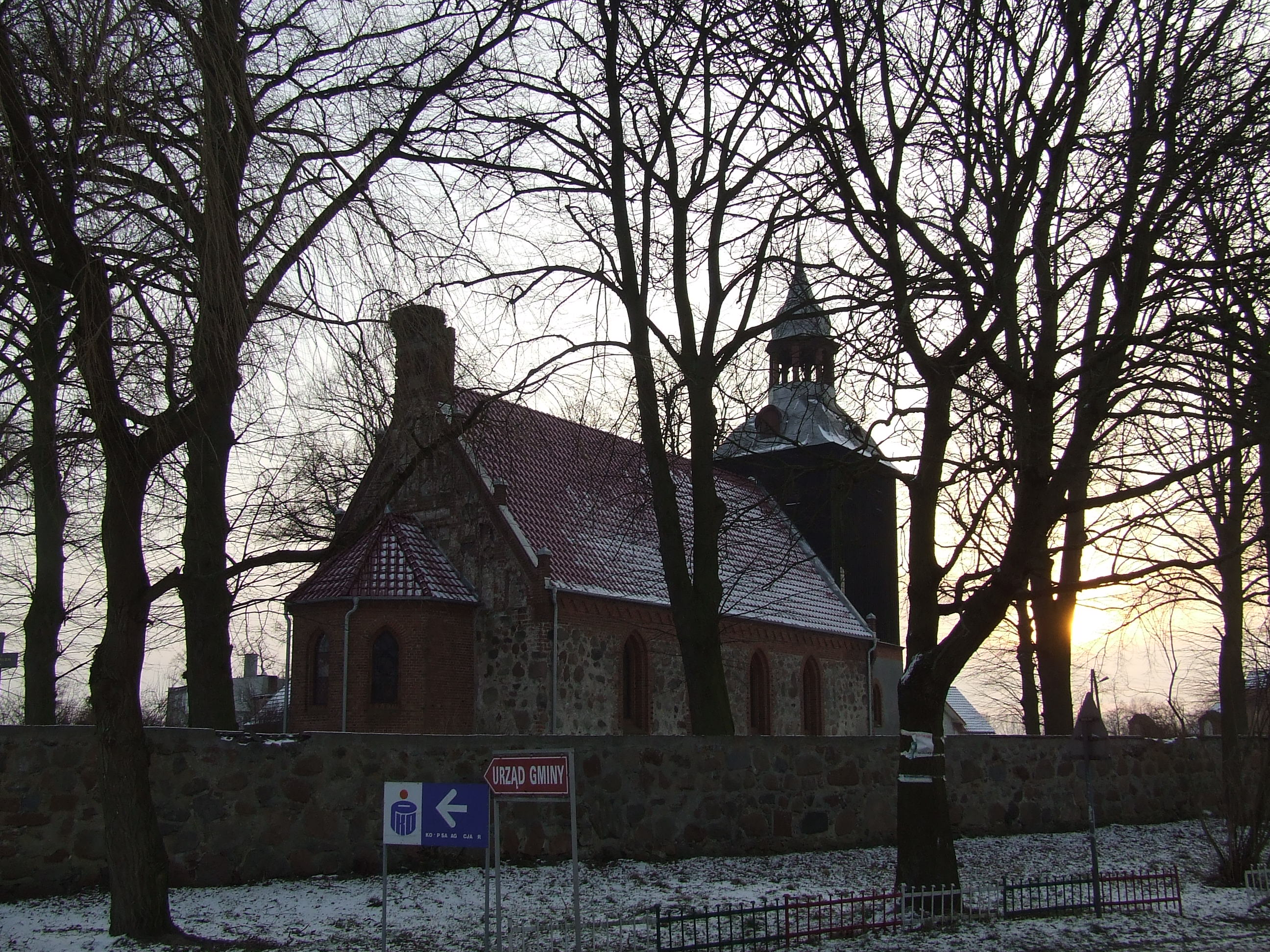
- Church of Saint Stanislaus

- Location within Poland
- Coordinates: 53°6′N 14°49′E
- Country: Poland
- Voivodeship: West Pomeranian
- County: Pyrzyce
- Gmina: Kozielice

Kozielice [kɔʑɛˈlit͡sɛ] (German: Köselitz) is a village in Pyrzyce County, West Pomeranian Voivodeship, in north-western Poland. It is the seat of the gmina (administrative district) called Gmina Kozielice. It lies approximately 6 km (4 mi) south-west of Pyrzyce and 39 km (24 mi) south-east of the regional capital Szczecin.

For the history of the region, see History of Pomerania.
