= Lipiany =

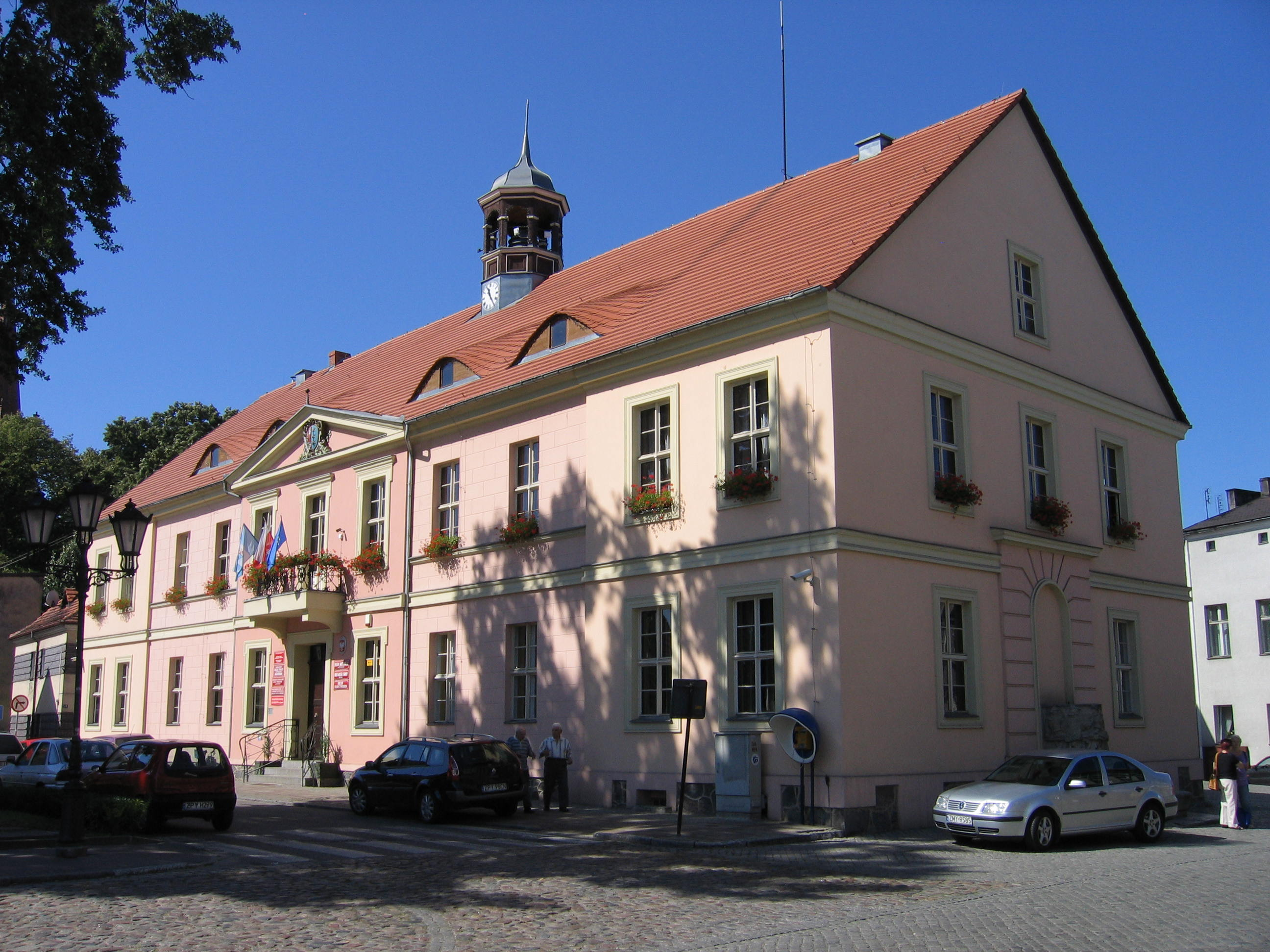
- Town hall

- Flag Coat of arms

- Location within Poland
- Coordinates: 53°0′1″N 14°57′31″E
- Country: Poland
- Voivodeship: West Pomeranian
- County: Pyrzyce
- Gmina: Lipiany
- Town rights: before 1302

Area
  - Total: 5.5 km^{2} (2.1 sq mi)
- Elevation: 54 m (177 ft)

Population (2010)
  - Total: 4,048
  - Density: 740/km^{2} (1,900/sq mi)
- Time zone: UTC+1 (CET)
  - Summer (DST): UTC+2 (CEST)
- Postal code: 74-240
- Vehicle registration: ZPY
- Website: http://www.lipiany.pl

Lipiany [lʲiˈpʲanɨ] (German: Lippehne) is a town in the Pyrzyce County in the West Pomeranian Voivodeship in north-western Poland, with 4,048 inhabitants (2010).

It was granted town rights before 1302.

== Culture ==
The Zaczynaj beer is a traditional beverage of Lipiany, as designated by the Ministry of Agriculture and Rural Development of Poland.

== Demographics ==
Historical population

Year	Pop.	±%
1871	3,253	—
1880	3,813	+17.2%
1890	3,911	+2.6%
1900	3,878	−0.8%
1910	4,056	+4.6%

Year	Pop.	±%
1925	4,303	+6.1%
1939	4,374	+1.7%
1950	3,316	−24.2%
1960	3,955	+19.3%
2010	4,048	+2.4%

== International relations ==
=== Twin towns — Sister cities ===
Lipiany is twinned with:

- Saint-Genest-d'Ambière, France
- Wietzendorf, Germany
