= Bielice, Pyrzyce County =

Bielice
- Village
- Location within Poland
- Coordinates: 53°11′58″N 14°43′43″E
- Country: Poland
- Voivodeship: West Pomeranian
- County: Pyrzyce
- Gmina: Bielice
- Population: 560

Bielice [bjɛˈlit͡sɛ] (German: Beelitz) is a village in Pyrzyce County, West Pomeranian Voivodeship, in north-western Poland. It is the seat of the gmina (administrative district) called Gmina Bielice. It lies approximately 13 km (8 mi) north-west of Pyrzyce and 26 km (16 mi) south of the regional capital Szczecin.

The village has a population of 560.
