= Przelewice, Pyrzyce County =

Przelewice
- Village
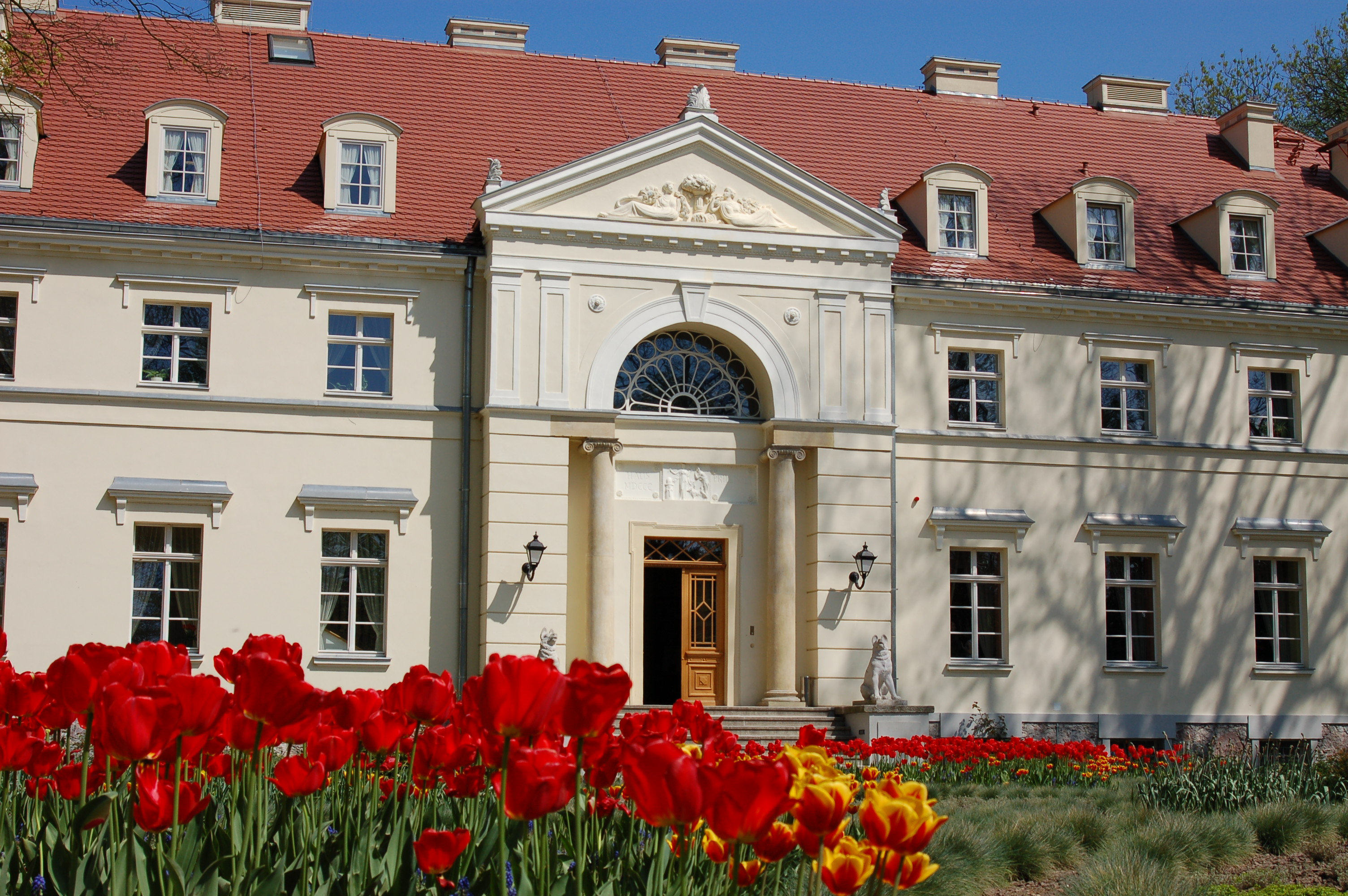
- Przelewice Palace

- Location within Poland
- Coordinates: 53°6′12″N 15°4′42″E
- Country: Poland
- Voivodeship: West Pomeranian
- County: Pyrzyce
- Gmina: Przelewice
- Population: 770
- Time zone: UTC+1 (CET)
  - Summer (DST): UTC+2 (CEST)
- Vehicle registration: ZPY

Przelewice ([pʂɛlɛˈvit͡sɛ]; German: Prillwitz) is a village in Pyrzyce County, West Pomeranian Voivodeship, in north-western Poland. It is the seat of the gmina (administrative district) called Gmina Przelewice. It lies approximately 14 km (9 mi) east of Pyrzyce and 48 km (30 mi) south-east of the regional capital Szczecin. The village has a population of 770.

Landmarks of Przelewice are the Dendrological Garden in Przelewice with the palace and the medieval Regina Mundi church.

== Cuisine ==
The officially protected traditional food of Przelewice and other nearby village, as designated by the Ministry of Agriculture and Rural Development of Poland, is the Przelewice Honey, which comes in several varieties, i.e. multi-flower honey, honeydew nectar honey, buckwheat honey, heather honey, phacelia honey, rapeseed honey, linden honey, cornflower honey and goldenrod honey.

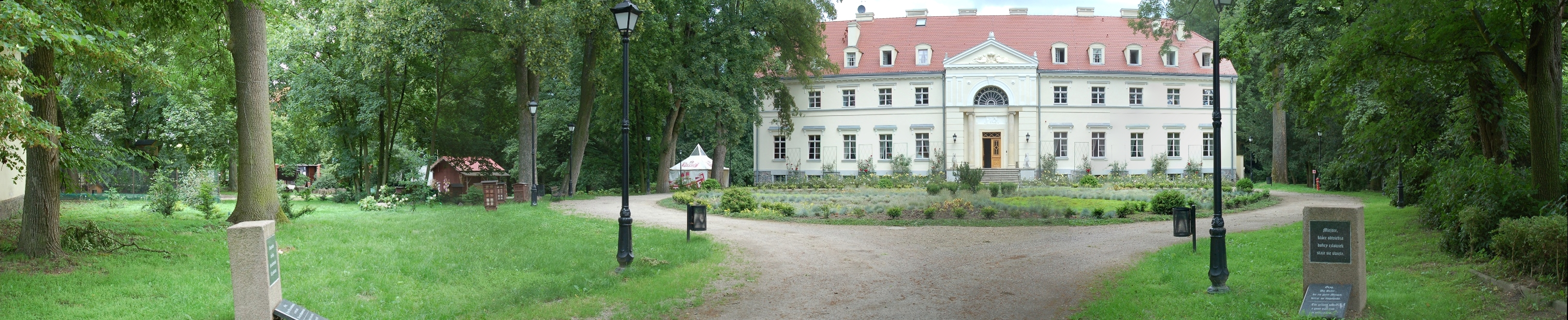
View of the Palace at the Garden in Przelewice
