= Pyrzyce County =

Pyrzyce County Powiat pyrzycki
- County
- Flag Coat of arms

- Location within the voivodeship

- Division into gminas
- Coordinates (Pyrzyce): 53°8′N 14°53′E
- Country: Poland
- Voivodeship: West Pomeranian
- Seat: Pyrzyce
- Gminas: Total 6: Gmina Bielice; Gmina Kozielice; Gmina Lipiany; Gmina Przelewice; Gmina Pyrzyce; Gmina Warnice

Area
  - Total: 725.71 km^{2} (280.20 sq mi)

Population (2006)
  - Total: 39,931
  - Density: 55.023/km^{2} (142.51/sq mi)
  - Urban: 16,766
  - Rural: 23,165
- Car plates: ZPY
- Website: www.pyrzyce.pl

Pyrzyce County (Polish: powiat pyrzycki) is a unit of territorial administration and local government (powiat) in West Pomeranian Voivodeship, north-western Poland. It came into being on January 1, 1999, as a result of the Polish local government reforms passed in 1998. Its administrative seat and largest town is Pyrzyce, which lies 38 kilometres (24 mi) south-east of the regional capital Szczecin. The only other town in the county is Lipiany, lying 16 km (10 mi) south of Pyrzyce.

The county covers an area of 725.71 square kilometres (280.2 sq mi). As of 2006 its total population is 39,931, out of which the population of Pyrzyce is 12,642, that of Lipiany is 4,124, and the rural population is 23,165.

== Neighbouring counties ==
Pyrzyce County is bordered by Stargard County to the north, Myślibórz County to the south and Gryfino County to the west.

== Administrative divisions ==
The county is subdivided into six gminas (two urban-rural and four rural). These are listed in the following table, in descending order of population.

Gmina	Type	Area (km^{2})	Population (2006)	Seat
Gmina Pyrzyce	urban-rural	204.4	19,515	Pyrzyce
Gmina Lipiany	urban-rural	94.6	6,033	Lipiany
Gmina Przelewice	rural	162.2	5,254	Przelewice
Gmina Warnice	rural	85.9	3,588	Warnice
Gmina Bielice	rural	84.1	2,930	Bielice
Gmina Kozielice	rural	94.5	2,611	Kozielice
