= List of German exonyms in the West Pomeranian Voivodeship =

This is a list of German language place names in Poland, now exonyms for towns and villages in Western Pomerania.

| Polish name | German name |
|---|---|
| Babigoszcz | Hammer |
| Baczysław | Batzlaff |
| Barlinek | Berlinchen |
| Barnim | Barnimskunow |
| Barwice | Bärwalde |
| Batowo | Batow |
| Będargowo, Choszczno County | Groß Mandelkow, Mandelkow (historically) |
| Będargowo, Police County | Mandelkow |
| Będgoszcz | Schützenaue |
| Biała, Stargard County | Ball |
| Biała, Szczecinek County | Groß Wittfelde |
| Biała Góra | Ballenberg |
| Białogard | Belgard |
| Białuń, Goleniów County | Gollnowshagen |
| Białuń, Stargard County | Müggenhall |
| Biały Bór | Baldenburg |
| Bobolice | Bublitz |
| Borne Sulinowo | Gross-Born |
| Borzym | Borin |
| Brzezin | Briesen |
| Brzeźniak | Birkholz |
| Brzeżno | Briesen bei Schivelbein |
| Brzózki | Althagen |
| Budzień | Schützendorf |
| Budzieszewice | Luttmannshagen |
| Bukowo | Buchholz |
| Cedynia | Zehden |
| Chojna | Königsberg in der Neumark |
| Chomętówko | Kolonie Gumtow |
| Chomętowo, Choszczno County | Großgut |
| Chomętowo, Gryfice County | Gumtow |
| Chomętowo, Świdwin County | Gumtow |
| Cieszyno | Teschendorf |
| Chociwel | Freienwalde in Pommern |
| Choszczno | Arnswalde |
| Czaplice, Gryfice County | Neu Zapplin |
| Czaplice, Wałcz County | Gramsthal |
| Czaplinek | Tempelburg |
| Czarnocin | Zartenthin |
| Czarnogłowy | Zarnglaff |
| Czarnowo | Groß Zarnow |
| Czernice, Choszczno County | Stadtziegelei |
| Czernice, Pyrzyce County | Sehmsdorf |
| Człopa | Schloppe |
| Dargobądz | Dargebanz |
| Darłowo | Rügenwalde |
| Darłówko | Rügenwaldermünde |
| Dębica, Kołobrzeg County | Damitz |
| Dębica, Pyrzyce County | Damnitz |
| Dębno | Neudamm |
| Dębostrów | Damuster |
| Dłusko | Gramswalde |
| Dobra | Daber |
| Dobrzany | Jacobshagen, Jakobshagen |
| Dominikowo | Mienken |
| Drawno | Neuwedell |
| Drawsko Pomorskie | Dramburg |
| Drzonowo Wałeckie | Drahnow |
| Drzonowo ZR | Gut Drahnow |
| Dzieszkowo | Neu Dischenhagen |
| Dzisna | Dischenhagen |
| Dziwnów | Dievenow |
| Dziwnówek | Klein Dievenow |
| Dźwirzyno | Kolberger Deep |
| Dzwonowo | Schönow |
| Gąsierzyno | Ganserin |
| Głusza | Bärenlager |
| Golczewo | Gülzow |
| Goleniów | Gollnow |
| Golin | Gollin |
| Gościno | Groß Jestin |
| Gozdowice | Güstebiese |
| Grabowo, Gryfino County | Grabow |
| Grabowo, Kamień County | Grabow |
| Grabowo, Kołobrzeg County | Stubbenberg |
| Grabowo, Łobez County | Grabow |
| Grabowo, Sławno County | Martinshagen, Alt Martinshagen |
| Grabowo, Stargard County | Buchholz |
| Grabowo, Szczecin | Stettin-Grabow |
| Grabowo, Szczecinek County | Grabau |
| Grędziec | Schöningen |
| Gryfice | Greifenberg in Pommern |
| Gryfino | Greifenhagen |
| Grzędzice | Seefeld |
| Grzybowo | Griebow |
| Ińsko | Nörenberg |
| Jaglice | Jagolitz |
| Jarosławiec | Jershöft |
| Jarszewko | Jassow am Haff |
| Jarszewo | Jassow |
| Jarzębowo | Jarmbow |
| Jelenie | Bußberg |
| Jeleni Róg | Dype, Düpe |
| Kalisz Pomorski | Kallies |
| Kamieniec | Schöningen |
| Kamień Pomorski | Cammin in Pommern |
| Karnocice | Karzig |
| Karlino | Körlin an der Persante |
| Kąty | Kattenhof |
| Kłęby, Kamień County | Klemmen |
| Kłęby, Pyrzyce County | Klemmen |
| Klępino | Klempin |
| Kluczkówko | Klützkower Mühle |
| Kluczkowo | Klützkow |
| Kodrąb | Codram, Kodram (1937-45) |
| Kodrąbek | Neu Kodram |
| Kołbaskowo | Kolbitzow, Colbitzow (historically) |
| Kołobrzeg | Kolberg, Colberg (historically) |
| Kopice | Köplitz |
| Korytowo, Choszczno County | Kürtow |
| Korytowo, Goleniów County | Walsleben |
| Kośnik | Hirschfelde |
| Koszalin | Köslin |
| Koszanowo | Kussenow |
| Koszewko | Klein Küssow |
| Koszewo | Groß Küssow |
| Kozy | Kashagen |
| Krajnik Dolny | Nieder-Kränig |
| Krajnik Górny | Hohen Kränig |
| Krąpiel | Krumpohl |
| Krasowo | Kerngrund |
| Krosino, Świdwin County | Grössin |
| Krosino, Szczecinek County | Groß Krössin |
| Kunowo, Gryfino County | Kunow |
| Kunowo, Stargard County | Kunow an der Straße |
| Kunowo, Świdwin County | Kuhnow |
| Kurcewo | Krüssow |
| Łeba | Leba |
| Linie | Leine |
| Linówko | Klein Lienichen |
| Lipiany | Lippehne |
| Lipnik | Lindenberg |
| Lisowo, Gryfice County | Leitzow |
| Lisowo, Koszalin County | Feldkaten |
| Lisowo, Stargard County | Vossberg |
| Łobez | Labes |
| Lubanowo | Liebenow |
| Lubin, Gryfice County | Lebbin |
| Lubin, Kamień County | Lebbin |
| Lutkowo | Rehwinkel |
| Machowica | Elis |
| Małkocin | Mulkenthin |
| Marszewo, Goleniów County | Marsdorf |
| Marszewo, Sławno County | Marsow |
| Maszewo | Massow |
| Mazańczyce | Neu Ziegenort |
| Miastko | Rummelsburg |
| Międzyzdroje | Misdroy |
| Miękowo, Goleniów County | Münchendorf |
| Miękowo, Szczecinek County | Münchowshof, Münchershof |
| Mielęcin, Choszczno County | Marienhof |
| Mielęcin, Pyrzyce County | Mellentin |
| Mielęcin, Wałcz County | Mellentin |
| Mielęcinek | Neu Mellentin |
| Mieszkowice | Bärwalde in der Neumark |
| Miłogoszcz, Koszalin County | Hohenfelde |
| Miłogoszcz, Łobez County | Sophienhof |
| Miłogoszcz, Wałcz County | Mehlgast |
| Miłowo | Flacke |
| Miodowice | Medewitz |
| Miradź | Grüneberg |
| Mirosławiec | Märkisch Friedland |
| Młyny | Möllendorf |
| Moczyły | Schillersdorf |
| Mokrzyca Mała | Klein Mokratz |
| Mokrzyca Wielka | Groß Mokratz |
| Moracz | Moratz |
| Moryń | Mohrin |
| Mrzeżyno | Deep, Treptower Deep |
| Myślibórz | Soldin |
| Nieborowo | Isinger |
| Niechorze | Horst |
| Niekłończyca | Königsfelde |
| Nosowo, Koszalin County | Nassow |
| Nosowo, Stargard County | Güntersberg |
| Nowe Chrapowo | Neu Grape |
| Nowe Warpno | Neuwarp |
| Nowice | Neuwitz |
| Nowogard | Naugard |
| Nowy Przylep | Neu Prilipp |
| Obryta | Groß Schönfeld |
| Okunica | Friedrichsthal in Pommern |
| Pargowo | Pargow |
| Pełczyce | Bernstein |
| Pęzino | Pansin |
| Piaski Małe | Paatzig |
| Pieczyska | Bevilsthal |
| Płocin | Plötzin |
| Płoty | Plathe an der Rega |
| Pobierowo | Poberow |
| Poczernin | Pützerlin |
| Polanów | Pollnow |
| Półchleb | Polchlep |
| Połczyno | Gustava |
| Połczyn-Zdrój | Bad Polzin |
| Police | Pölitz |
| Przelewice | Prellwitz |
| Przewłoki | Heinrichsthal |
| Przybiernów | Pribbernow |
| Pustelnia | Salmer Teerofen |
| Pyrzyce | Pyritz |
| Rąbino | Groß Rambin |
| Racimierz | Hermannsthal |
| Recz | Reetz |
| Reńsko | Schönbrunn |
| Resko | Regenwalde |
| Rokita | Rackitt |
| Rosówek | Neu Rosow |
| Rożnowo | Rosenfelde |
| Rusinowo, Gmina Tuczno | Ruschendorf |
| Rusinowo, Gmina Wałcz | Ruschendorf |
| Rusinowo, Sławno County | Rützenhagen |
| Rusinowo, Świdwin County | Rützenhagen |
| Ryszewko | Klein Rischow |
| Ryszewo | Groß Rischow |
| Rzystnowo | Rißnow |
| Sadłowo | Zadelow |
| Sarbinowo | Zorndorf |
| Siadło Dolne | Niederzahden |
| Siadło Górne | Hohenzahden |
| Sianów | Zanow |
| Siekierki | Zäckerick |
| Skalin | Schellin |
| Skoszewo | Paulsdorf |
| Sławno | Schlawe |
| Słodkówko | Klein Schlatikow |
| Słodkowo | Groß Schlatikow |
| Słupsk | Stolp |
| Śmięć | Schminz |
| Sobiemyśl | Frankenberg |
| Sobieszewo | Matthishof |
| Sokoliniec | Falkenwalde |
| Sosnowice, Goleniów County | Heinrichshof |
| Sosnowice, Kamień County | Heinrichshof |
| Sosnowo, Gryfino County | Gebersdorf |
| Sosnowo, Łobez County | Zozenow |
| Sowno | Hinzendorf |
| Stara Rudnica | Alt Rüdnitz |
| Stare Chrapowo | Alt Grape |
| Stare Czarnowo | Neumark |
| Stargard | Stargard in Pommern |
| Stary Błeszyn | Alt-Blessin |
| Stary Kostrzynek | Altküstrinchen |
| Stary Przylep | Alt Prilipp |
| Stepnica | Stepenitz, Bad Stepenitz |
| Stepniczka | Sandhof |
| Strzaliny | Strahlenberg |
| Strzebielewo | Strebelow |
| Strzyżno | Streesen |
| Suchań | Zachan |
| Suchanówko | Schwanenbeck |
| Suliszewo, Choszczno County | Zühlsdorf |
| Suliszewo, Drawsko County | Zülshagen |
| Sułomino | Soldemin |
| Świdwin | Schivelbein |
| Święte | Schwendt |
| Świętoszewko | Schwanteshagener Mühle |
| Świętoszewo | Schwanteshagen |
| Świętowice | Schwantefitz, Schwantewitz |
| Świnoujście | Swinemünde |
| Swochowo | Schwochow |
| Szadzko | Saatzig |
| Szczecin | Stettin |
| Szczecinek | Neustettin |
| Szczuczarz | Zützer |
| Trzcińsko-Zdrój | Bad Schönfließ |
| Trzebianowo | Trebenow |
| Trzebiatów | Treptow, Treptow an der Rega |
| Trzebież | Ziegenort |
| Trzebin | Trebbin |
| Tuczno | Tütz, Tietz (historically) |
| Turze, Drawsko County | Thurbruch |
| Turze, Myślibórz County | Thur |
| Turze, Pyrzyce County | Horst |
| Tychowo | Groß Tychow |
| Tyczewo | Tietzow |
| Ulikowo | Wulkow |
| Uniemyśl | Wilhelmsdorf |
| Unin | Tonnin, Alt-Tonnin |
| Ustronie Morskie | Henkenhagen, Ostseebad Henkenhagen |
| Wałcz | Deutsch Krone |
| Wapnica | Kalkofen |
| Wardyń | Wardin |
| Warnice, Myślibórz County | Warnitz |
| Warnice, Pyrzyce County | Warnitz |
| Warnołęka | Wahrlang |
| Węgorzyno | Wangerin |
| Wicko | Vietzig |
| Widuchowa | Fiddichow |
| Widzieńsko | Hohenbrück |
| Wierzchosław | Amalienhof |
| Wilczkowo, Gryfice County | Völschenhagen |
| Wilczkowo, Świdwin County | Völzkow |
| Wisełka | Neuendorf |
| Witkowo I | Wittichow |
| Witkowo II | Wittichow bei Stargard |
| Włodzisław, Goleniów County | Baumgarten |
| Włodzisław, Sławno County | Lerchenhain |
| Wójcin | Waitendorf |
| Wojnowice | Ohnewitz |
| Wołczyn | Kinderfreude |
| Wołowe Lasy | Eichfier |
| Wysoka Kamieńska | Wietstock |
| Zabierzewo | Sabessow |
| Zaborsko | Sabes |
| Żabów | Sabow |
| Żabówko | Klein Sabow |
| Żabowo | Groß Sabow |
| Zagozd | Neu Schönwalde |
| Załom | Salm |
| Żarnówko | Neu Sarnow |
| Żarnowo, Goleniów County | Alt Sarnow |
| Żarnowo, Pyrzyce County | Ernsthof |
| Żarowo | Saarow |
| Zdbowo | Stibbe |
| Zielonczyn | Graseberg |
| Złocieniec | Falkenburg |
| Żółwia Błoć | Barfußdorf |
| Żukowo, Gryfice County | Suckowshof |
| Żukowo, Sławno County | Suckow |
| Żukowo, Stargard County | Suckow an der Ihna |

== See also ==
- List of German exonyms for places in Poland
