= Cieszynka =

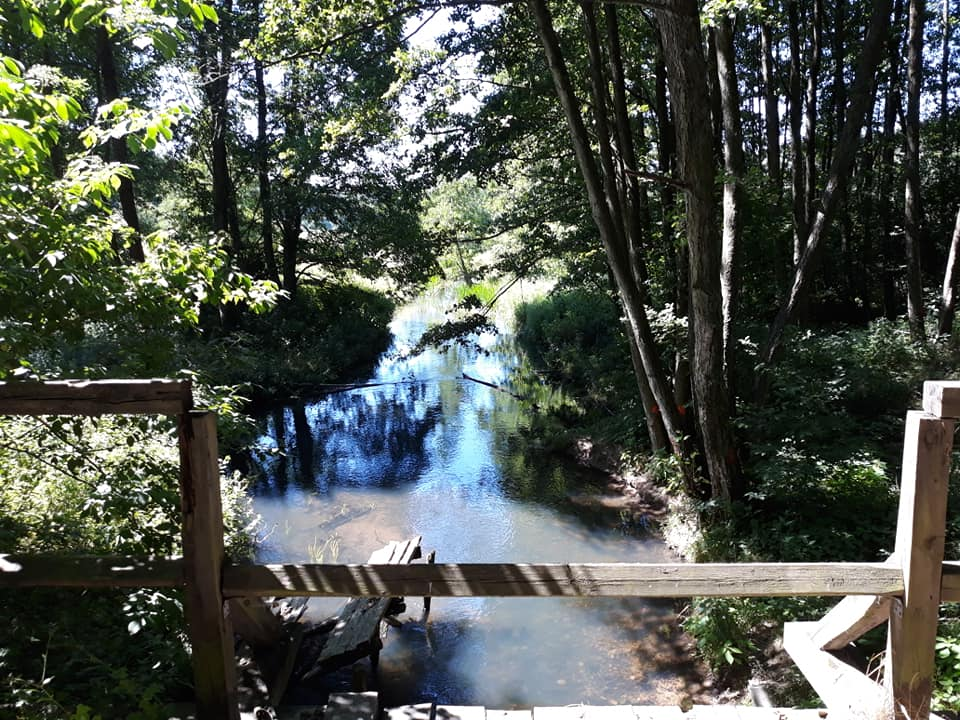
- Cieszynka nea Bukowo

Location
- Country: Poland
- Voivodeship: West Pomeranian

Physical characteristics
- Source
  - location: near Mielęcin
  - coordinates: 53°07′19.0″N 16°16′17.0″E
- Mouth: Płociczna
  - location: West of Jeleni Róg
  - coordinates: 53°05′11″N 15°59′53″E
  - elevation: 57 m (187 ft)
- Length: 26.89 km (16.71 mi)

Basin features
- Progression: Płociczna→ Drawa→ Noteć→ Warta→ Oder→ Baltic Sea

Cieszynka is a river of Poland, a tributary of the Płociczna. It passes through Człopa, West Pomeranian Voivodeship. In German it was known as the Dessel.
