= Barnim (disambiguation) =

Barnim is a district in Brandenburg, Germany.

Barnim may also refer to:

- Barnim (name)
- Barnim Plateau
- Barnim, West Pomeranian Voivodeship, a village in north-western Poland
