= Reczek =

Location
- Country: Poland
- Voivodeship: West Pomeranian
- County (Powiat): Stargard

Physical characteristics
- Source: Lake Sierakowskie
  - location: east of Sierakowo, Gmina Dobrzany
  - coordinates: 53°18′38″N 15°27′23″E
- Mouth: Ina
  - location: southeast of Suchanówko, Gmina Suchań
  - coordinates: 53°15′14″N 15°20′17″E
  - elevation: 27 m (89 ft)
- Length: 16.79 km (10.43 mi)
- Basin size: 60 km^{2} (23 mi^{2})

Basin features
- Progression: Ina→ Oder→ Baltic Sea

Reczek (also: Reczyca) is a river of Poland, a right tributary of the Ina near Suchań.
