= Więcław, Świdwin County =

Więcław
- Village
- Location within Poland
- Coordinates: 53°41′N 15°47′E
- Country: Poland
- Voivodeship: West Pomeranian
- County: Świdwin
- Gmina: Brzeżno

Więcław [ˈvjɛnt͡swaf] (German: Venzlaffshagen) is a village in the administrative district of Gmina Brzeżno, within Świdwin County, West Pomeranian Voivodeship, in north-western Poland. It lies approximately 4 km (2 mi) south of Brzeżno, 12 km (7 mi) south of Świdwin, and 85 km (53 mi) east of the regional capital Szczecin.

== See also ==
History of Pomerania
