= David Hollatz =

David Hollatz may refer to:

- David Hollatz (dogmatician) (1648–1713), Lutheran dogmatician
- David Hollatz (writer) (died 1771), German Lutheran minister, grandson of the dogmatician
