= Ininy =

- Village
- Location within Poland
- Coordinates: 53°15′34″N 15°25′53″E
- Country: Poland
- Voivodeship: West Pomeranian
- County: Stargard
- Gmina: Suchań

Ininy [iˈninɨ] (German: Ihnau) is a village in the administrative district of Gmina Suchań, within Stargard County, West Pomeranian Voivodeship, in north-western Poland. It lies approximately 8 km (5 mi) east of Suchań, 28 km (17 mi) east of Stargard, and 60 km (37 mi) east of the regional capital Szczecin.
