= Janowo, Pyrzyce County =

Janowo
- Settlement
- Location within Poland
- Coordinates: 53°11′21″N 14°59′55″E
- Country: Poland
- Voivodeship: West Pomeranian
- County: Pyrzyce
- Gmina: Warnice

Janowo [jaˈnɔvɔ] is a settlement in the administrative district of Gmina Warnice, within Pyrzyce County, West Pomeranian Voivodeship, in north-western Poland. It lies approximately 8 km (5 mi) south of Warnice, 10 km (6 mi) north-east of Pyrzyce, and 38 km (24 mi) south-east of the regional capital Szczecin.

== See also ==
- History of Pomerania
