= Słonowice, West Pomeranian Voivodeship =

Słonowice
- Village
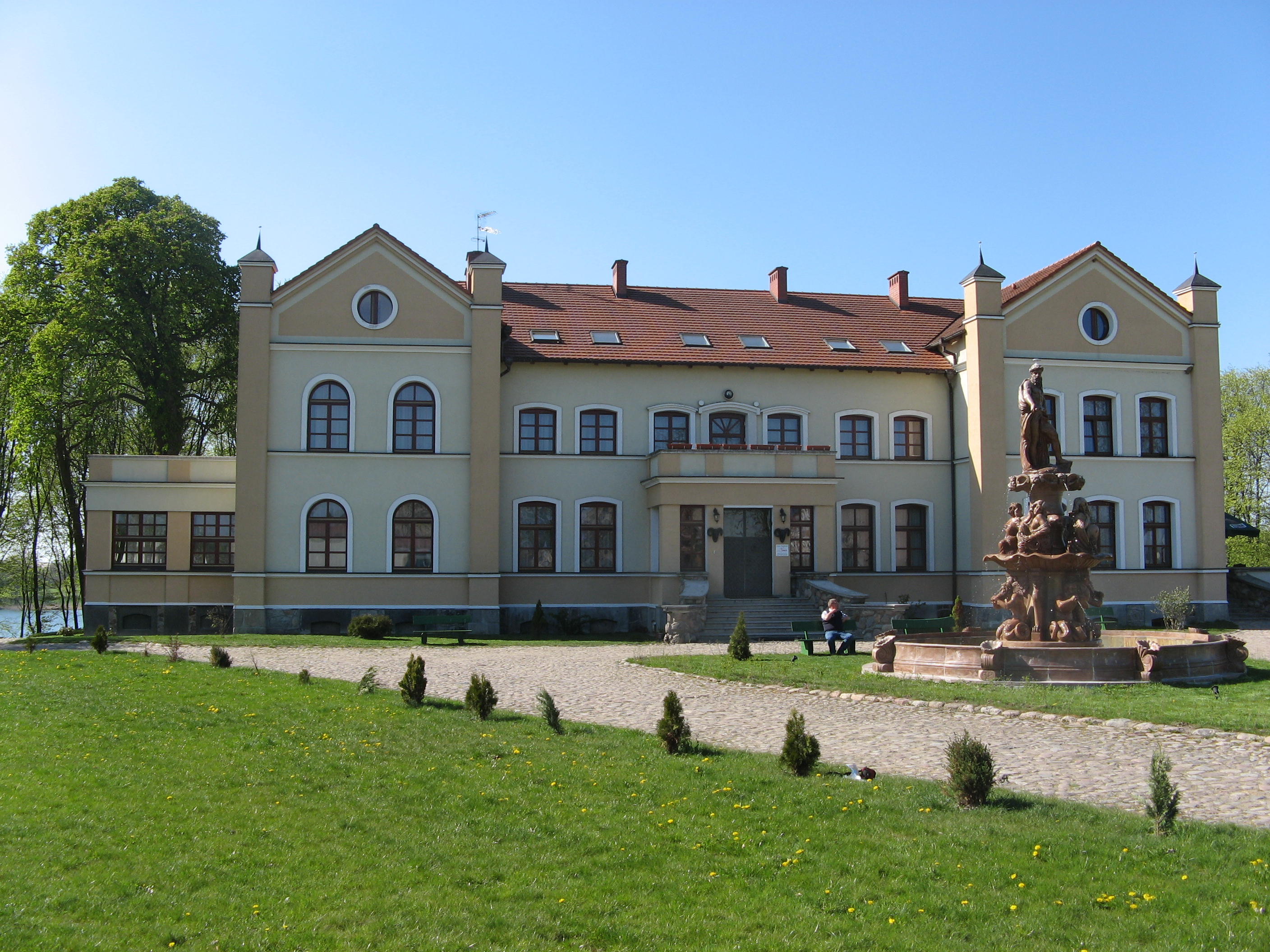
- Słonowice Palace

- Location within Poland
- Coordinates: 53°42′N 15°42′E
- Country: Poland
- Voivodeship: West Pomeranian
- County: Świdwin
- Gmina: Brzeżno
- Time zone: UTC+1 (CET)
  - Summer (DST): UTC+2 (CEST)
- Vehicle registration: ZSD

Słonowice [swɔnɔˈvit͡sɛ] is a village in the administrative district of Gmina Brzeżno, within Świdwin County, West Pomeranian Voivodeship, in north-western Poland. It lies approximately 5 km (3 mi) south-west of Brzeżno, 11 km (7 mi) south-west of Świdwin, and 81 km (50 mi) north-east of the regional capital Szczecin.

It is located in the historic region of Pomerania.
