= Zastawie, West Pomeranian Voivodeship =

Zastawie
- Settlement
- Location within Poland
- Coordinates: 53°16′28″N 15°21′40″E
- Country: Poland
- Voivodeship: West Pomeranian
- County: Stargard
- Gmina: Suchań

Zastawie [zasˈtavjɛ] (German: Alt Teich) is a settlement in the administrative district of Gmina Suchań, within Stargard County, West Pomeranian Voivodeship, in north-western Poland. It lies approximately 3 km (2 mi) east of Suchań, 23 km (14 mi) east of Stargard, and 55 km (34 mi) east of the regional capital Szczecin.

For the history of the region, see History of Pomerania.
