= Hans-Jürgen Schlieker =

German painter (1924–2004)

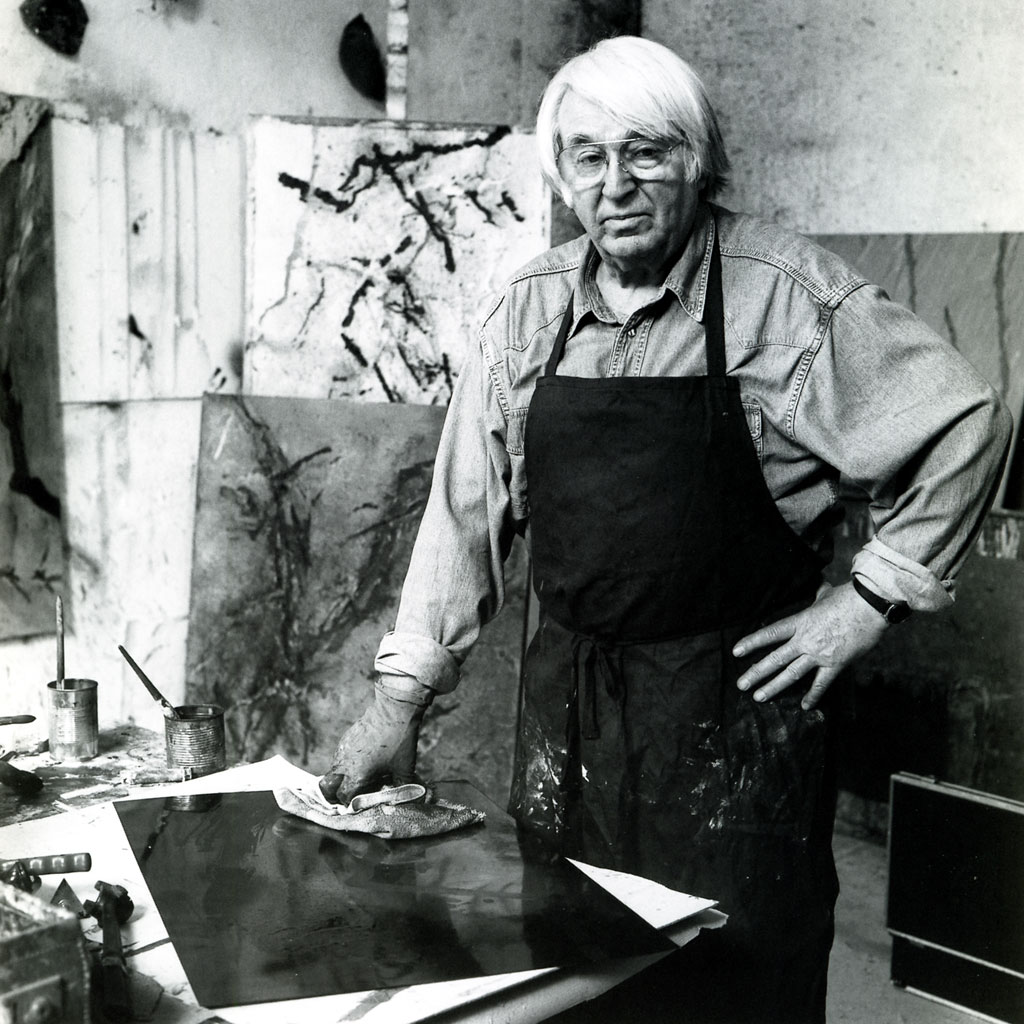
- Born: April 8, 1924; Grędziec (earlier Schöningen)
- Died: March 12, 2004 (aged 79); Bochum
- Education: Art College Hamburg, Erich Hartmann
- Known for: painting, etching
- Movement: German Informal Art

Hans-Jürgen Schlieker (April 8, 1924 – March 12, 2004) was a German abstract painter, grouped in importance with Hans Hartung, Bernard Schultze and Emil Schumacher.

== Biography ==
Schlieker was born in 1924 in Schöningen (today Grędziec, Poland), East Pomerania, where he grew up and completed a formal education before deciding to study applied arts at a local studio. After a period of focused study, he served as a soldier for three years in the German army, an experience which he later expressed pictorially in flamboyant 50s colours and through artistic work groups. (These have returned to new importance thanks to the lectures of the poet, Baudelaire [Les fleurs du mal].)

After the war and a temporary stay at an artist's centre in Mecklenburg, Schlieker moved to Hamburg to study at the Kunsthochschule (arts college) under Erich Hartmann. Upon completing his studies in 1951, he married Gisela Chrambach and moved to Bochum in the Ruhr Valley, where he began life as a freelance artist. His only daughter, Claudia, was born in 1952.

In 1954, he travelled the Mediterranean on the German Orient Line and visited Spain, Algeria, Tunisia, Greece and Turkey. The trip left a deep impression and instilled a wanderlust. After completing a major in 1957-1958, he and his family moved to San Pol, Spain, a pristine bay on the Mediterranean.

Schlieker won two art prizes, the Westphalian Art Association's '‘Jungwestfalen award’' in 1958, and Maler sehen Stuttgart (Painters see Stuttgart) in 1959.

For the next few years, Schlieker taught at a gymnasium in Bochum before moving to Ruhr University in 1968 to build up its fine arts department. Managing the entire programme, he soon became mentor to countless students seeking guidance and inspiration in the arts.

In 1989, he retired from teaching and was awarded the Verdienstorden des Landes Nordrhein-Westfalen (Order of Merit of North Rhine-Westphalia) for his work. Other winners that year were K. O. Götz, Adolf Luther, Bernard Schultze, Hann Trier and Günther Uecker.

Schlieker entered the classroom three more times to hold seminars on etching at the Academy of Fine Arts Vienna in 1994, 1996 and 1997. He died on March 12, 2004 in Bochum.

== Examples of work ==
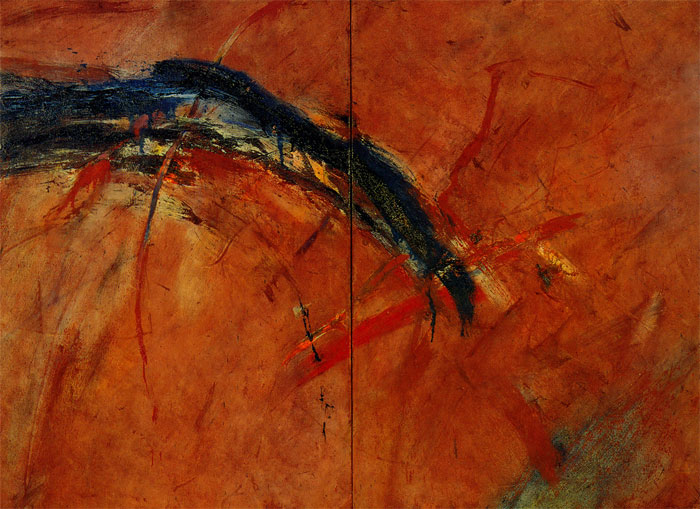
Spring 91, oil on canvas, 160x220cm

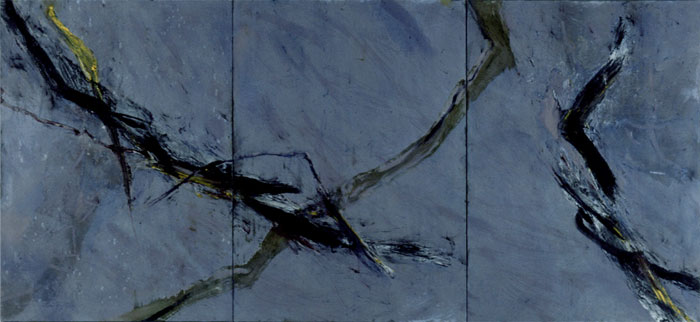
Blue Image 1990, oil on canvas, 190x400cm

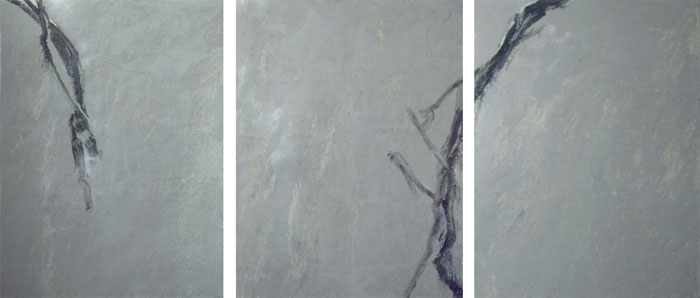
January 83/2, oil on canvas, 170x400cm

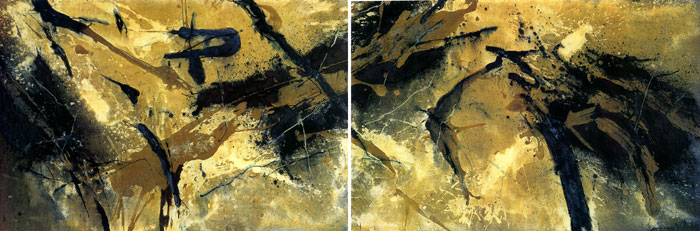
May 13, 2000, oil on canvas, 100x300cm

A comprehensive collection of works by the artist is shown on his official website

== Schlieker Haus ==
The Schlieker Haus, opened in 2005 in the Querenburg suburb of Bochum, serves the purpose of documenting the life and work of the artist. In addition to a comprehensive collection of Schlieker paintings, the Schlieker Haus regularly organizes exhibitions of 20th and 21st century art.
