= Krajewo, West Pomeranian Voivodeship =

Krajewo
- Settlement
- Location within Poland
- Coordinates: 53°41′52″N 15°43′09″E
- Country: Poland
- Voivodeship: West Pomeranian
- County: Świdwin
- Gmina: Brzeżno
- Time zone: UTC+1 (CET)
  - Summer (DST): UTC+2 (CEST)
- Postal code: 78-316
- Area code: +48 94

Krajewo (Polish: [kraˈjɛ.vɔ]) is a settlement in the West Pomeranian Voivodeship, Poland, located within the Gmina Brzeżno, Świdwin County.
