= Karsibór (disambiguation) =

Karsibór is an island forming part of the Polish port town of Świnoujście.

- Karsibór, a village on the above island previously called Kaseburg.

Karsibór may also refer to the following villages in Poland:

- Karsibór, Świdwin County
- Karsibór, Wałcz County
