= Wapnica, Stargard County =

Wapnica
- Village
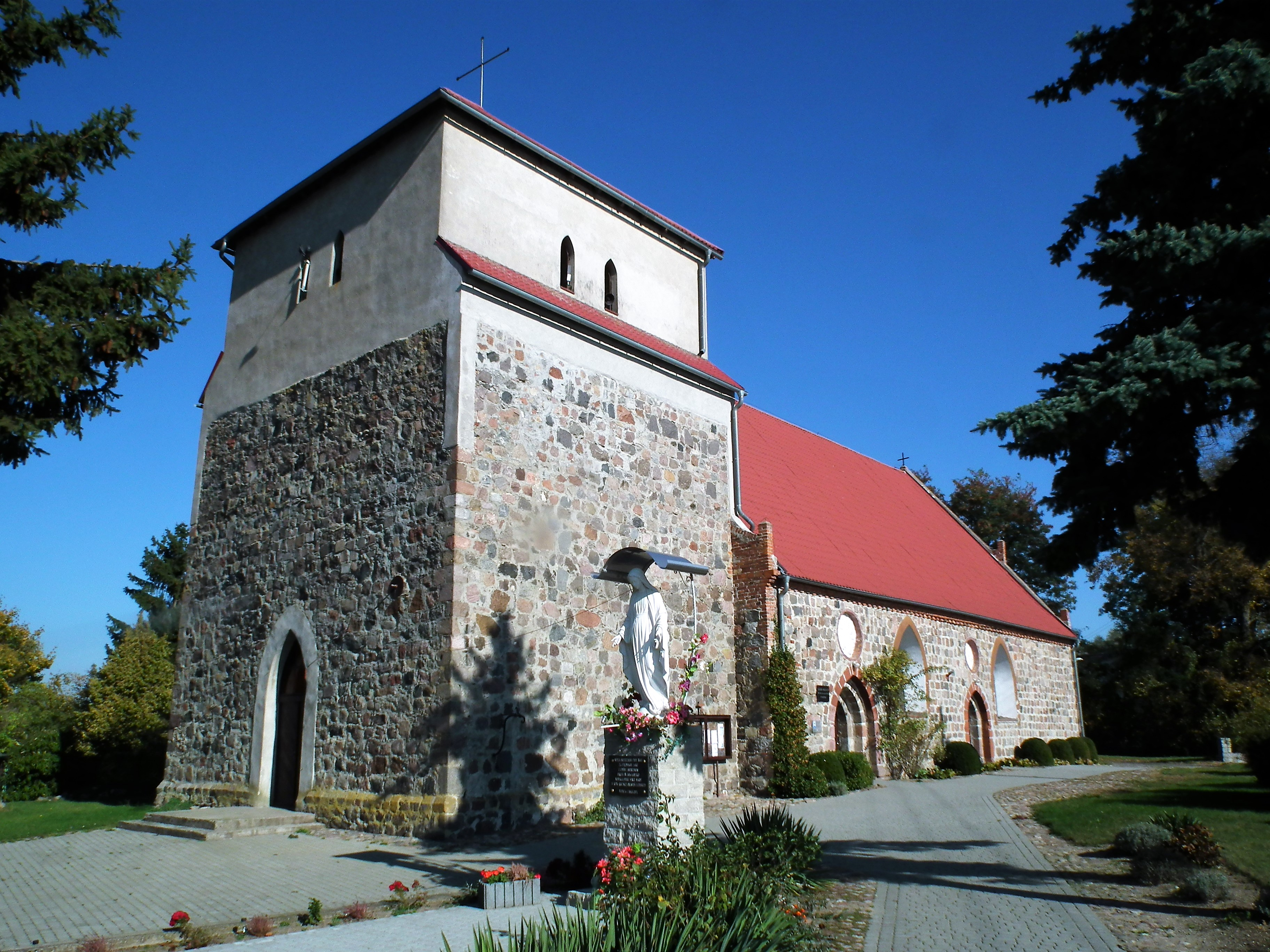
- Medieval Saint John Cantius church in Wapnica

- Location within Poland
- Coordinates: 53°16′30″N 15°27′43″E
- Country: Poland
- Voivodeship: West Pomeranian
- County: Stargard
- Gmina: Suchań
- Time zone: UTC+1 (CET)
  - Summer (DST): UTC+2 (CEST)
- Vehicle registration: ZST

Wapnica [vapˈnit͡sa] is a village in the administrative district of Gmina Suchań, within Stargard County, West Pomeranian Voivodeship, in north-western Poland. It lies approximately 10 km (6 mi) east of Suchań, 30 km (19 mi) east of Stargard, and 61 km (38 mi) east of the regional capital Szczecin.

During World War II, the German administration operated a forced labour subcamp of the Stalag II-D prisoner-of-war camp in the village.
