= Wierzbno, West Pomeranian Voivodeship =

Wierzbno
- Village
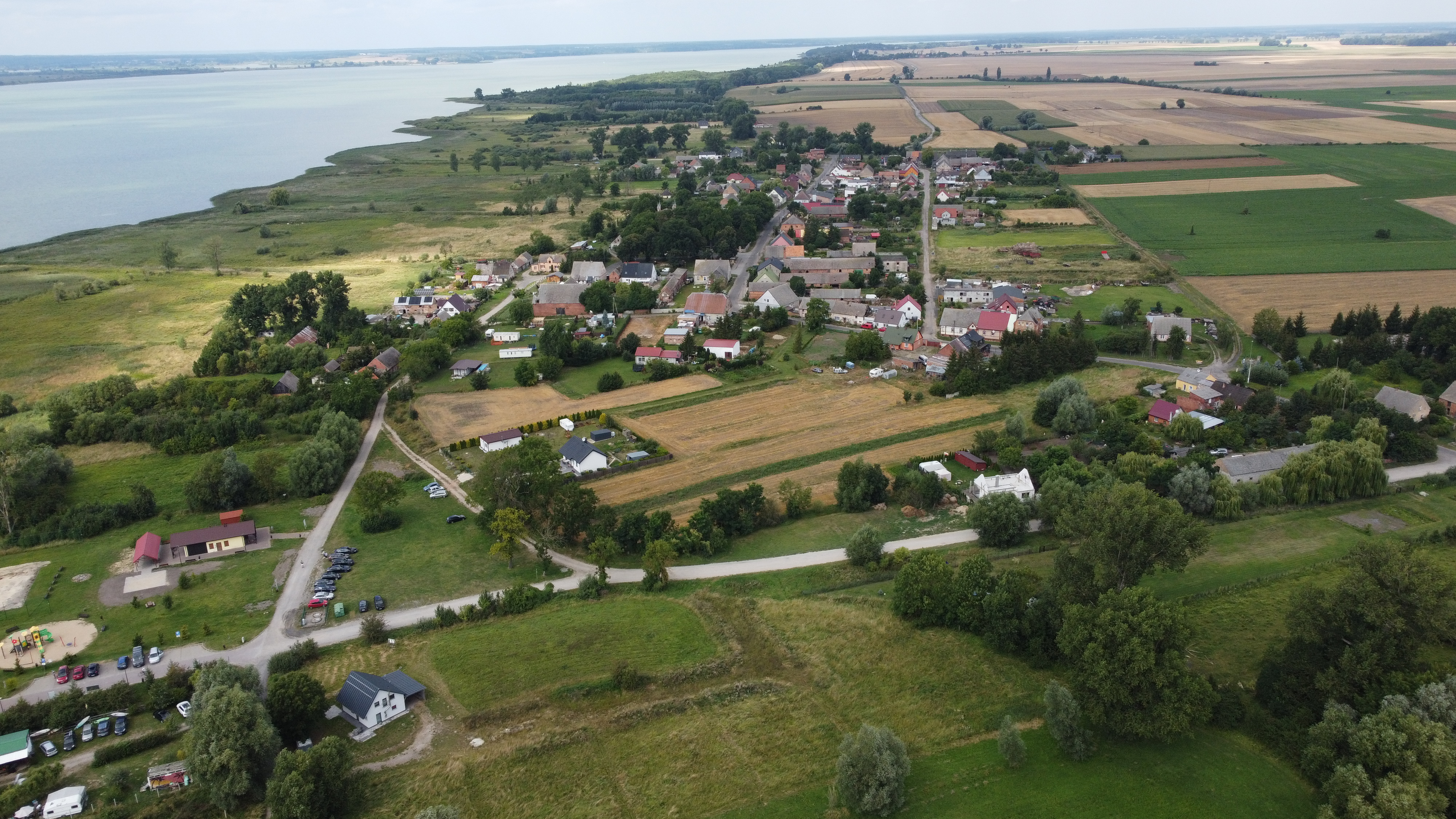

- Location within Poland
- Coordinates: 53°14′N 14°54′E
- Country: Poland
- Voivodeship: West Pomeranian
- County: Pyrzyce
- Gmina: Warnice

Population
  - Total: 400
- Time zone: UTC+1 (CET)
  - Summer (DST): UTC+2 (CEST)
- Vehicle registration: ZPY

Wierzbno [ˈvjɛʐbnɔ] (German: Werben) is a village in the administrative district of Gmina Warnice, within Pyrzyce County, West Pomeranian Voivodeship, in north-western Poland. It lies approximately 6 km (4 mi) west of Warnice, 12 km (7 mi) north of Pyrzyce, and 30 km (19 mi) south-east of the regional capital Szczecin. The village has a population of 400.

== See also ==
- History of Pomerania
