= Dzwonowo =

Dzwonowo may refer to the following places:

- Dzwonowo, Greater Poland Voivodeship (west-central Poland)
- Dzwonowo, Stargard County in West Pomeranian Voivodeship (north-west Poland)
- Dzwonowo, Wałcz County in West Pomeranian Voivodeship (north-west Poland)
- Dzwonowo (hamlet), Wałcz County in West Pomeranian Voivodeship (north-west Poland)
