= Tarnowo, Stargard County =

Tarnowo
- Village
- Location within Poland
- Coordinates: 53°18′29″N 15°22′12″E
- Country: Poland
- Voivodeship: West Pomeranian
- County: Stargard
- Gmina: Suchań
- Population: 300

Tarnowo [tarˈnɔvɔ] (German: Tornow) is a village in the administrative district of Gmina Suchań located within Stargard County, West Pomeranian Voivodeship in north-western Poland. It lies approximately 5 km (3 mi) north-east of Suchań, 23 km (14 mi) east of Stargard and 54 km (34 mi) east of the regional capital Szczecin.

For the history of the region, see History of Pomerania.

The village has a population of 300.
