= Suchanki =

- Village
- Location within Poland
- Coordinates: 53°17′37″N 15°21′51″E
- Country: Poland
- Voivodeship: West Pomerania
- County: Stargard
- Gmina: Suchań
- Population: 52

Suchanki [suˈxanki] is a village in the administrative district of Gmina Suchań, within Stargard County, West Pomeranian Voivodeship, in north-western Poland. It lies approximately 4 km (2 mi) north-east of Suchań, 23 km (14 mi) east of Stargard, and 54 km (34 mi) east of the regional capital Szczecin.

For the history of the region, see History of Pomerania.

The village has a population of 52.
