= Podłęcze, Stargard County =

Podłęcze
- Village
- Location within Poland
- Coordinates: 53°15′31″N 15°27′40″E
- Country: Poland
- Voivodeship: West Pomeranian
- County: Stargard
- Gmina: Suchań

Podłęcze [pɔdˈwɛnt͡ʂɛ] (German: Lenzhof) is a village in the administrative district of Gmina Suchań, within Stargard County, West Pomeranian Voivodeship, in north-western Poland. It lies approximately 10 km (6 mi) east of Suchań, 30 km (19 mi) east of Stargard, and 61 km (38 mi) east of the regional capital Szczecin.

For the history of the region, see History of Pomerania.
