= Brudzewice, West Pomeranian Voivodeship =

Brudzewice
- Village
- Location within Poland
- Coordinates: 53°18′48″N 15°14′54″E
- Country: Poland
- Voivodeship: West Pomeranian
- County: Stargard
- Gmina: Suchań

Brudzewice [brud͡zɛˈvit͡sɛ], (German: Brüsewitz) is a village in the administrative district of Gmina Suchań, within Stargard County, West Pomeranian Voivodeship, in north-western Poland. It lies approximately 7 km (4 mi) north-west of Suchań, 15 km (9 mi) east of Stargard, and 46 km (29 mi) east of the regional capital Szczecin.
