= Przyrzecze, West Pomeranian Voivodeship =

Przyrzecze
- Village
- Location within Poland
- Coordinates: 53°42′N 15°53′E
- Country: Poland
- Voivodeship: West Pomeranian
- County: Świdwin
- Gmina: Brzeżno

Przyrzecze [pʂɨˈʐɛt͡ʂɛ] (German Wartenstein) is a village in the administrative district of Gmina Brzeżno, within Świdwin County, West Pomeranian Voivodeship, in north-western Poland. It lies approximately 8 km (5 mi) east of Brzeżno, 13 km (8 mi) south-east of Świdwin, and 92 km (57 mi) east of the regional capital Szczecin.

For the history of the region, see History of Pomerania.
