= Załom =

Załom may refer to the following places in Poland:

- Załom, Goleniów County
- Załom, Wałcz County
- Załom, Szczecin
