= David Hollatz (writer) =

German Lutheran Grandson

David Hollatz (the younger) (1704 – 14 June 1771) was a German Lutheran minister grandson of the dogmatician David Hollatz. He was preacher at Güntersberg, near Zachan, in Pomerania from 1730 till his death. After a controversy between Hollatz and Siegmund Jakob Baumgarten of Halle orthodox Lutherans looked upon him with disfavor. He steadily receded more and more from the church doctrines and adopted the views of the Moravians, among whom he found greater sympathy.

== Works ==
He wrote devotional books which were much read and translated (e.g., Gebahnte Pilgerstrasse nach dem Berge Zion, Basel, 1866; Evangelische Gnadenordnungen, Basel, 1894; Eng. transl., The Order of Evangelical Grace in the Economy of Salvation, London, 1838; Verherrlichung Christi in seinem theueren and unschätzbaren Blute, Basel 1894). His Sämtliche erbauliche Schriften were published in two parts at Görlitz, 1772–1773, and Frankfort, 1782.
