= Barnim, West Pomeranian Voivodeship =

Barnim
- Village
- Location within Poland
- Coordinates: 53°14′N 15°0′E
- Country: Poland
- Voivodeship: West Pomeranian
- County: Pyrzyce
- Gmina: Warnice

Barnim [ˈbarnim] (German: Barnimskunow) is a village in the administrative district of Gmina Warnice, within Pyrzyce County, West Pomeranian Voivodeship, in north-western Poland. It lies approximately 3 km (2 mi) south-east of Warnice, 14 km (9 mi) north-east of Pyrzyce, and 35 km (22 mi) south-east of the regional capital Szczecin.

== See also ==
History of Pomerania
