= Dębica, Pyrzyce County =

Dębica
- Village
- Location within Poland
- Coordinates: 53°15′12″N 14°57′48″E
- Country: Poland
- Voivodeship: West Pomeranian
- County: Pyrzyce
- Gmina: Warnice

Dębica [dɛmˈbit͡sa] (German: Damnitz) is a village in the administrative district of Gmina Warnice, within Pyrzyce County, West Pomeranian Voivodeship, in north-western Poland. It lies approximately 2 km (1 mi) west of Warnice, 15 km (9 mi) north of Pyrzyce, and 32 km (20 mi) south-east of the regional capital Szczecin.

== See also ==
History of Pomerania
