= Jelenie, West Pomeranian Voivodeship =

Jelenie
- Village
- Location within Poland
- Coordinates: 53°9′17″N 15°59′21″E
- Country: Poland
- Voivodeship: West Pomeranian
- County: Wałcz
- Gmina: Człopa

Population
  - Total: 64
- Time zone: UTC+1 (CET)
  - Summer (DST): UTC+2 (CEST)
- Vehicle registration: ZWA

Jelenie [jɛˈlɛɲɛ] (formerly German: Bußberg) is a village in the administrative district of Gmina Człopa, within Wałcz County, West Pomeranian Voivodeship, in north-western Poland. It lies approximately 13 km (8 mi) north-west of Człopa, 35 km (22 mi) west of Wałcz, and 98 km (61 mi) east of the regional capital Szczecin.

The village has a population of 64.
