= Przelewice, Wałcz County =

Przelewice
- Village
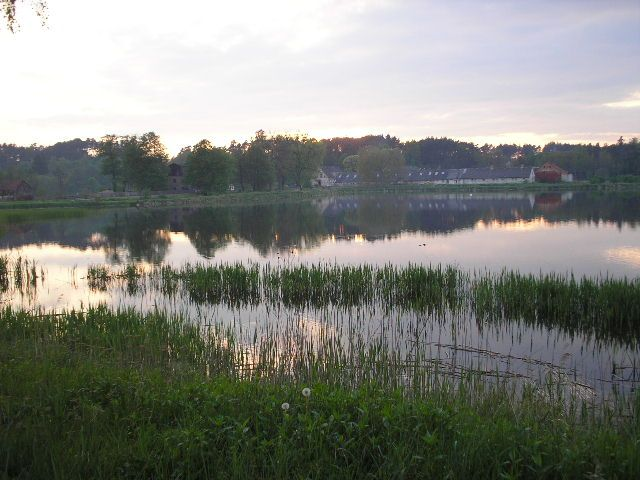

- Location within Poland
- Coordinates: 53°2′N 16°7′E
- Country: Poland
- Voivodeship: West Pomeranian
- County: Wałcz
- Gmina: Człopa

Population
  - Total: 200
- Time zone: UTC+1 (CET)
  - Summer (DST): UTC+2 (CEST)
- Vehicle registration: ZWA

Przelewice [pʂɛlɛˈvit͡sɛ] (German: Prellwitz) is a village in the administrative district of Gmina Człopa, within Wałcz County, West Pomeranian Voivodeship, in north-western Poland. It lies approximately 6 km (4 mi) south of Człopa, 35 km (22 mi) south-west of Wałcz, and 111 km (69 mi) south-east of the regional capital Szczecin.

The village has a population of 200.

== History ==
The area was part of the Kingdom of Poland until the First Partition of Poland in 1772, then part of Prussia and Germany in 1772–1945. It became again part of Poland following the defeat of Germany in World War II in 1945.
