= Rzepczyno =

- Village
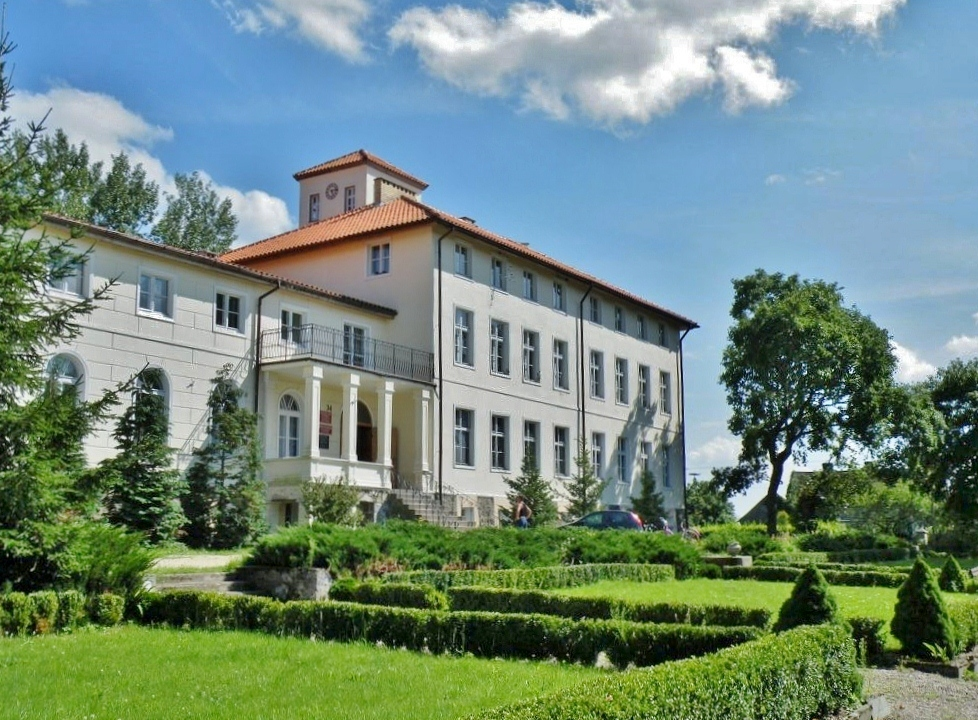
- Rzepczyno Palace

- Location within Poland
- Coordinates: 53°42′N 15°49′E
- Country: Poland
- Voivodeship: West Pomeranian
- County: Świdwin
- Gmina: Brzeżno
- Time zone: UTC+1 (CET)
  - Summer (DST): UTC+2 (CEST)
- Vehicle registration: ZSD

Rzepczyno [ʐɛpˈt͡ʂɨnɔ] is a village in the administrative district of Gmina Brzeżno, within Świdwin County, West Pomeranian Voivodeship, in north-western Poland. It lies approximately 10 km (6 mi) south of Świdwin and 88 km (55 mi) east of the regional capital Szczecin.
