= Nałęcze, West Pomeranian Voivodeship =

Nałęcze
- Village
- Location within Poland
- Coordinates: 53°06′32″N 16°10′06″E
- Country: Poland
- Voivodeship: West Pomeranian
- County: Wałcz
- Gmina: Człopa
- Population: 41

Nałęcze [naˈwɛnt͡ʂɛ] is a village in the administrative district of Gmina Człopa, within Wałcz County, West Pomeranian Voivodeship, in north-western Poland.

The village has a population of 41.
