= Karsibór, Świdwin County =

Karsibór
- Village
- Location within Poland
- Coordinates: 53°40′N 15°52′E
- Country: Poland
- Voivodeship: West Pomeranian
- County: Świdwin
- Gmina: Brzeżno

Karsibór [karˈɕibur] (German Karsbaum) is a village in the administrative district of Gmina Brzeżno, within Świdwin County, West Pomeranian Voivodeship, in north-western Poland. It lies approximately 9 km (6 mi) south-east of Brzeżno, 15 km (9 mi) south-east of Świdwin, and 90 km (56 mi) east of the regional capital Szczecin.
