= Jagoda, West Pomeranian Voivodeship =

Jagoda
- Settlement
- Location within Poland
- Coordinates: 53°03′46″N 16°00′38″E
- Country: Poland
- Voivodeship: West Pomeranian
- County: Wałcz
- Gmina: Człopa

Population
  - Total: 0
- Time zone: UTC+1 (CET)
  - Summer (DST): UTC+2 (CEST)
- Vehicle registration: ZWA

Jagoda [jaˈɡɔda] is a former settlement in the administrative district of Gmina Człopa, within Wałcz County, West Pomeranian Voivodeship, in north-western Poland.
