= Nosowo, Stargard County =

Nosowo
- Village
- Location within Poland
- Coordinates: 53°16′10″N 15°24′21″E
- Country: Poland
- Voivodeship: West Pomeranian
- County: Stargard
- Gmina: Suchań

Nosowo [nɔˈsɔvɔ], (formerly German: Güntersberg) is a village in the administrative district of Gmina Suchań, within Stargard County, West Pomeranian Voivodeship, in north-western Poland. It lies approximately 6 km (4 mi) east of Suchań, 26 km (16 mi) east of Stargard, and 58 km (36 mi) east of the regional capital Szczecin.

For the history of the region, see History of Pomerania.

== Notable residents ==
- David Hollatz (writer) (died 14 June 1771), German Lutheran ministerm
