= Chomętowo, Świdwin County =

Chomętowo
- Village
- Location within Poland
- Coordinates: 53°44′N 15°50′E
- Country: Poland
- Voivodeship: West Pomeranian
- County: Świdwin
- Gmina: Brzeżno

Chomętowo [xɔmɛnˈtɔvɔ] (German: Gumtow) is a village in the administrative district of Gmina Brzeżno, within Świdwin County, West Pomeranian Voivodeship, in north-western Poland. It lies approximately 5 km (3 mi) north-east of Brzeżno, 8 km (5 mi) south-east of Świdwin, and 90 km (56 mi) north-east of the regional capital Szczecin.
