= Podlesie, Wałcz County =

Podlesie
- Settlement
- Location within Poland
- Coordinates: 53°06′18″N 16°07′50″E
- Country: Poland
- Voivodeship: West Pomeranian
- County: Wałcz
- Gmina: Człopa
- Population: 6

Podlesie [pɔdˈlɛɕɛ] is a settlement in the administrative district of Gmina Człopa, within Wałcz County, West Pomeranian Voivodeship, in north-western Poland.

The settlement has a population of 6.
