= Sadłowo, West Pomeranian Voivodeship =

Sadłowo
- Village
- Location within Poland
- Coordinates: 53°16′43″N 15°16′18″E
- Country: Poland
- Voivodeship: West Pomeranian
- County: Stargard
- Gmina: Suchań

Sadłowo [saˈdwɔvɔ] (German: Zadelow) is a village in the administrative district of Gmina Suchań, within Stargard County, West Pomeranian Voivodeship, in north-western Poland. It lies approximately 4 km (2 mi) west of Suchań, 17 km (11 mi) east of Stargard, and 49 km (30 mi) east of the regional capital Szczecin.

For the history of the region, see History of Pomerania.
