= Obryta =

- Village
- Location within Poland
- Coordinates: 53°13′N 14°58′E
- Country: Poland
- Voivodeship: West Pomeranian
- County: Pyrzyce
- Gmina: Warnice

Population
  - Total: 250
- Time zone: UTC+1 (CET)
  - Summer (DST): UTC+2 (CEST)

Obryta [ɔˈbrɨta] is a village in the administrative district of Gmina Warnice, within Pyrzyce County, West Pomeranian Voivodeship, in north-western Poland. It lies approximately 5 km (3 mi) south-west of Warnice, 11 km (7 mi) north-east of Pyrzyce, and 34 km (21 mi) south-east of the regional capital Szczecin.

The village has a population of approximately 250.

During World War II, the Germans operated a forced labour subcamp of the Stalag II-D prisoner-of-war camp in the village.
