= Sonino, Poland =

Sonino
- Settlement
- Location within Poland
- Coordinates: 53°41′04″N 15°49′51″E
- Country: Poland
- Voivodeship: West Pomeranian
- County: Świdwin
- Gmina: Brzeżno

Sonino [sɔˈninɔ] (German: Brandenbruch) is a settlement in the administrative district of Gmina Brzeżno, within Świdwin County, West Pomeranian Voivodeship, in north-western Poland.

== See also ==
- History of Pomerania
