= Pęczerzyński Młyn =

- Settlement
- Location within Poland
- Coordinates: 53°40′45″N 15°46′40″E
- Country: Poland
- Voivodeship: West Pomeranian
- County: Świdwin
- Gmina: Brzeżno

Pęczerzyński Młyn [pɛnt͡ʂɛˈʐɨɲski ˈmwɨn] is a settlement in the administrative district of Gmina Brzeżno, within Świdwin County, West Pomeranian Voivodeship, in north-western Poland.

For the history of the region, see History of Pomerania.
