= Miłoszewice =

- Settlement
- Location within Poland
- Coordinates: 53°41′26″N 15°49′07″E
- Country: Poland
- Voivodeship: West Pomeranian
- County: Świdwin
- Gmina: Brzeżno

Miłoszewice [miwɔʂɛˈvit͡sɛ] is a settlement in the administrative district of Gmina Brzeżno, within Świdwin County, West Pomeranian Voivodeship, in north-western Poland.

For the history of the region, see History of Pomerania.
