= Pęczerzyno =

- Village
- Location within Poland
- Coordinates: 53°41′N 15°44′E
- Country: Poland
- Voivodeship: West Pomeranian
- County: Świdwin
- Gmina: Brzeżno

Pęczerzyno [pɛnt͡ʂɛˈʐɨnɔ] (German Panzerin) is a village in the administrative district of Gmina Brzeżno, within Świdwin County, West Pomeranian Voivodeship, in north-western Poland. It lies approximately 12 km (7 mi) south of Świdwin and 82 km (51 mi) east of the regional capital Szczecin.

For the history of the region, see History of Pomerania.
