= Koszanowo, West Pomeranian Voivodeship =

Koszanowo
- Village
- Location within Poland
- Coordinates: 53°44′N 15°48′E
- Country: Poland
- Voivodeship: West Pomeranian
- County: Świdwin
- Gmina: Brzeżno

Koszanowo [kɔʂaˈnɔvɔ] (German Kussenow) is a village in the administrative district of Gmina Brzeżno, within Świdwin County, West Pomeranian Voivodeship, in north-western Poland. It lies approximately 3 km (2 mi) north-east of Brzeżno, 6 km (4 mi) south of Świdwin, and 88 km (55 mi) north-east of the regional capital Szczecin.

For the history of the region, see History of Pomerania.
