= Gmina Człopa =

Gmina Człopa Człopa Commune
- Gmina
- Flag Coat of arms
- Interactive map of Gmina Człopa
- Coordinates (Człopa): 53°5′N 16°8′E
- Country: Poland
- Voivodeship: West Pomeranian
- County: Wałcz
- Seat: Człopa

Area
  - Total: 348.37 km^{2} (134.51 sq mi)

Population (2006)
  - Total: 5,124
  - Density: 14.71/km^{2} (38.09/sq mi)
  - Urban: 2,390
  - Rural: 2,734
- Website: http://www.czlopa.pl/

Gmina Człopa is an urban-rural gmina (administrative district) in Wałcz County, West Pomeranian Voivodeship, in north-western Poland. Its seat is the town of Człopa, which lies approximately 31 kilometres (19 mi) south-west of Wałcz and 110 km (68 mi) east of the regional capital Szczecin.

The gmina covers an area of 348.37 square kilometres (134.5 sq mi), and as of 2006 its total population is 5,124 (out of which the population of Człopa amounts to 2,390, and the population of the rural part of the gmina is 2,734).

== Villages ==
Apart from the town of Człopa, Gmina Człopa contains the villages and settlements of Brzeźniak, Bukowo, Czaplice, Dłusko, Drzonowo Wałeckie, Drzonowo ZR, Dzwonowo, Golin, Jaglice, Jagoda, Jeleni Róg, Jelenie, Krąpiel, Mielęcin, Miradź, Nałęcze, Orzeń, Pieczyska, Podgórze, Podlesie, Przelewice, Pustelnia, Rybakówka, Szczuczarz, Trzcinno, Trzebin, Wołowe Lasy, Załom and Zwierz.

== Neighbouring gminas ==
Gmina Człopa is bordered by the gminas of Dobiegniew, Drawno, Krzyż Wielkopolski, Trzcianka, Tuczno, Wałcz and Wieleń.
