= Słodkowo =

- Village
- Location within Poland
- Coordinates: 53°17′40″N 15°19′7″E
- Country: Poland
- Voivodeship: West Pomeranian
- County: Stargard
- Gmina: Suchań

Słodkowo [swɔtˈkɔvɔ] (German: Groß Schlatikow) is a village in the administrative district of Gmina Suchań, within Stargard County, West Pomeranian Voivodeship, in north-western Poland. It is located approximately 2 km (1 mi) north of Suchań, 20 km (12 mi) east of Stargard, and 51 km (32 mi) east of the regional capital Szczecin.

For the history of the region, see History of Pomerania.
