= Grąbczewo, West Pomeranian Voivodeship =

Grąbczewo
- Settlement
- Location within Poland
- Coordinates: 53°40′58″N 15°51′28″E
- Country: Poland
- Voivodeship: West Pomeranian
- County: Świdwin
- Gmina: Brzeżno

Grąbczewo [ɡrɔmpˈt͡ʂɛvɔ] is a settlement in the administrative district of Gmina Brzeżno in Świdwin County, West Pomeranian Voivodeship, northwestern Poland.

For the region's history, see History of Pomerania.
