= Rybakówka, West Pomeranian Voivodeship =

Rybakówka
- Settlement
- Location within Poland
- Coordinates: 53°05′09″N 16°05′21″E
- Country: Poland
- Voivodeship: West Pomeranian
- County: Wałcz
- Gmina: Człopa
- Population: 12

Rybakówka [rɨbaˈkufka] is a settlement in the administrative district of Gmina Człopa, within Wałcz County, West Pomeranian Voivodeship, in north-western Poland.

== Demographics ==
The settlement has a population of 12.
