= Zaborsko, West Pomeranian Voivodeship =

Zaborsko
- Village
- Location within Poland
- Coordinates: 53°11′N 15°1′E
- Country: Poland
- Voivodeship: West Pomeranian
- County: Pyrzyce
- Gmina: Warnice

Zaborsko [zaˈbɔrskɔ] (German: Sabes) is a village in the administrative district of Gmina Warnice, within Pyrzyce County, West Pomeranian Voivodeship, in north-western Poland. It lies approximately 8 km (5 mi) south of Warnice, 11 km (7 mi) north-east of Pyrzyce, and 39 km (24 mi) south-east of the regional capital Szczecin.

== See also ==
- History of Pomerania
