= Grądzkie, West Pomeranian Voivodeship =

Grądzkie
- Settlement
- Location within Poland
- Coordinates: 53°42′20″N 15°52′28″E
- Country: Poland
- Voivodeship: West Pomeranian
- County: Świdwin
- Gmina: Brzeżno

Grądzkie [ˈɡrɔnt͡skʲɛ] (German: Langenhaken) is a settlement in the administrative district of Gmina Brzeżno, within Świdwin County, West Pomeranian Voivodeship, in north-western Poland. It lies approximately 12 km (7 mi) south-east of Świdwin and 92 km (57 mi) east of the regional capital Szczecin.
