= Mulite =

- Village
- Location within Poland
- Coordinates: 53°43′4″N 15°49′47″E
- Country: Poland
- Voivodeship: West Pomeranian
- County: Świdwin
- Gmina: Brzeżno

Mulite [muˈlitɛ] (German: Barenwinkel) is a village in the administrative district of Gmina Brzeżno, within Świdwin County, West Pomeranian Voivodeship, in north-western Poland. It lies approximately 9 km (6 mi) south-east of Świdwin and 89 km (55 mi) east of the regional capital Szczecin.

For the history of the region, see History of Pomerania.
