= Gmina Warnice =

Gmina Warnice Warnice Commune
- Gmina
- Flag Coat of arms
- Interactive map of Gmina Warnice
- Coordinates (Warnice): 53°15′9″N 14°59′34″E
- Country: Poland
- Voivodeship: West Pomeranian
- County: Pyrzyce
- Seat: Warnice

Area
  - Total: 85.86 km^{2} (33.15 sq mi)

Population (2006)
  - Total: 3,588
  - Density: 41.79/km^{2} (108.2/sq mi)
- Website: http://www.warnice.pl/

Gmina Warnice is a rural gmina (administrative district) in Pyrzyce County, West Pomeranian Voivodeship, in north-western Poland. Its seat is the village of Warnice, which lies approximately 16 kilometres (10 mi) north-east of Pyrzyce and 33 km (21 mi) south-east of the regional capital Szczecin.

The gmina covers an area of 85.86 square kilometres (33.2 sq mi), and as of 2006 its total population is 3,588.

== Villages ==
Gmina Warnice contains the villages and settlements of Barnim, Cieszysław, Dębica, Grędziec, Janowo, Kłęby, Nowy Przylep, Obryta, Reńsko, Stary Przylep, Warnice, Wierzbno, Wójcin and Zaborsko.

== Neighbouring gminas ==
Gmina Warnice is bordered by the town of Stargard and by the gminas of Dolice, Przelewice, Pyrzyce, Stare Czarnowo and Stargard.
