= Półchleb, Gmina Brzeżno =

Półchleb
- Settlement
- Location within Poland
- Coordinates: 53°43′44″N 15°44′28″E
- Country: Poland
- Voivodeship: West Pomeranian
- County: Świdwin
- Gmina: Brzeżno

Półchleb [ˈpuu̯xlɛp] (German: Polchlep) is a settlement in the administrative district of Gmina Brzeżno, within Świdwin County, West Pomeranian Voivodeship, in north-western Poland.

For the history of the region, see History of Pomerania.
