= Czaplice, Wałcz County =

Czaplice
- Village
- Location within Poland
- Coordinates: 53°5′37″N 16°9′15″E
- Country: Poland
- Voivodeship: West Pomeranian
- County: Wałcz
- Gmina: Człopa
- Population: 204

Czaplice [t͡ʂaˈplit͡sɛ] (formerly German: Gramsthal) is a village in the administrative district of Gmina Człopa, within Wałcz County, West Pomeranian Voivodeship, in north-western Poland. It lies approximately 2 km (1 mi) north-east of Człopa, 29 km (18 mi) south-west of Wałcz, and 111 km (69 mi) east of the regional capital Szczecin.

The village has a population of 204.
