= Żukowo, Stargard County =

Żukowo
- Village
- Location within Poland
- Coordinates: 53°16′N 15°12′E
- Country: Poland
- Voivodeship: West Pomeranian
- County: Stargard
- Gmina: Suchań
- Population: 320

Żukowo [ʐuˈkɔvɔ] (German: Suckow an der Ihna) is a village in the administrative district of Gmina Suchań, within Stargard County, West Pomeranian Voivodeship, in north-western Poland. It lies approximately 9 km (6 mi) west of Suchań, 14 km (9 mi) south-east of Stargard, and 45 km (28 mi) east of the regional capital Szczecin.

For the history of the region, see History of Pomerania.

The village has a population of 320.
