= Słodkówko =

- Village
- Location within Poland
- Coordinates: 53°18′17″N 15°16′46″E
- Country: Poland
- Voivodeship: West Pomeranian
- County: Stargard
- Gmina: Suchań

Słodkówko [swɔtˈkufkɔ] (German: Klein Schlatikow) is a village in the administrative district of Gmina Suchań, within Stargard County, West Pomeranian Voivodeship, in north-western Poland. It lies approximately 5 km (3 mi) north-west of Suchań, 17 km (11 mi) east of Stargard, and 48 km (30 mi) east of the regional capital Szczecin.

For the history of the region, see History of Pomerania.
