= Kłęby, Pyrzyce County =

Kłęby
- Village
- Location within Poland
- Coordinates: 53°12′50″N 15°2′30″E
- Country: Poland
- Voivodeship: West Pomeranian
- County: Pyrzyce
- Gmina: Warnice

Kłęby [ˈkwɛmbɨ] (German: Klemmen) is a village in the administrative district of Gmina Warnice, within Pyrzyce County, West Pomeranian Voivodeship, in north-western Poland. It lies approximately 6 km (4 mi) south-east of Warnice, 14 km (9 mi) north-east of Pyrzyce, and 38 km (24 mi) south-east of the regional capital Szczecin.

== See also ==
- History of Pomerania
