= Kłącko =

- Settlement
- Location within Poland
- Coordinates: 52°37′54″N 17°25′50″E
- Country: Poland
- Voivodeship: West Pomeranian
- County: Świdwin
- Gmina: Brzeżno

Kłącko [ˈkwɔnt͡skɔ] (German: Klanzig) is a settlement in the administrative district of Gmina Brzeżno, within Świdwin County, West Pomeranian Voivodeship, in north-western Poland.

For the history of the region, see History of Pomerania.
