= Wilczkowo, Świdwin County =

Wilczkowo
- Settlement
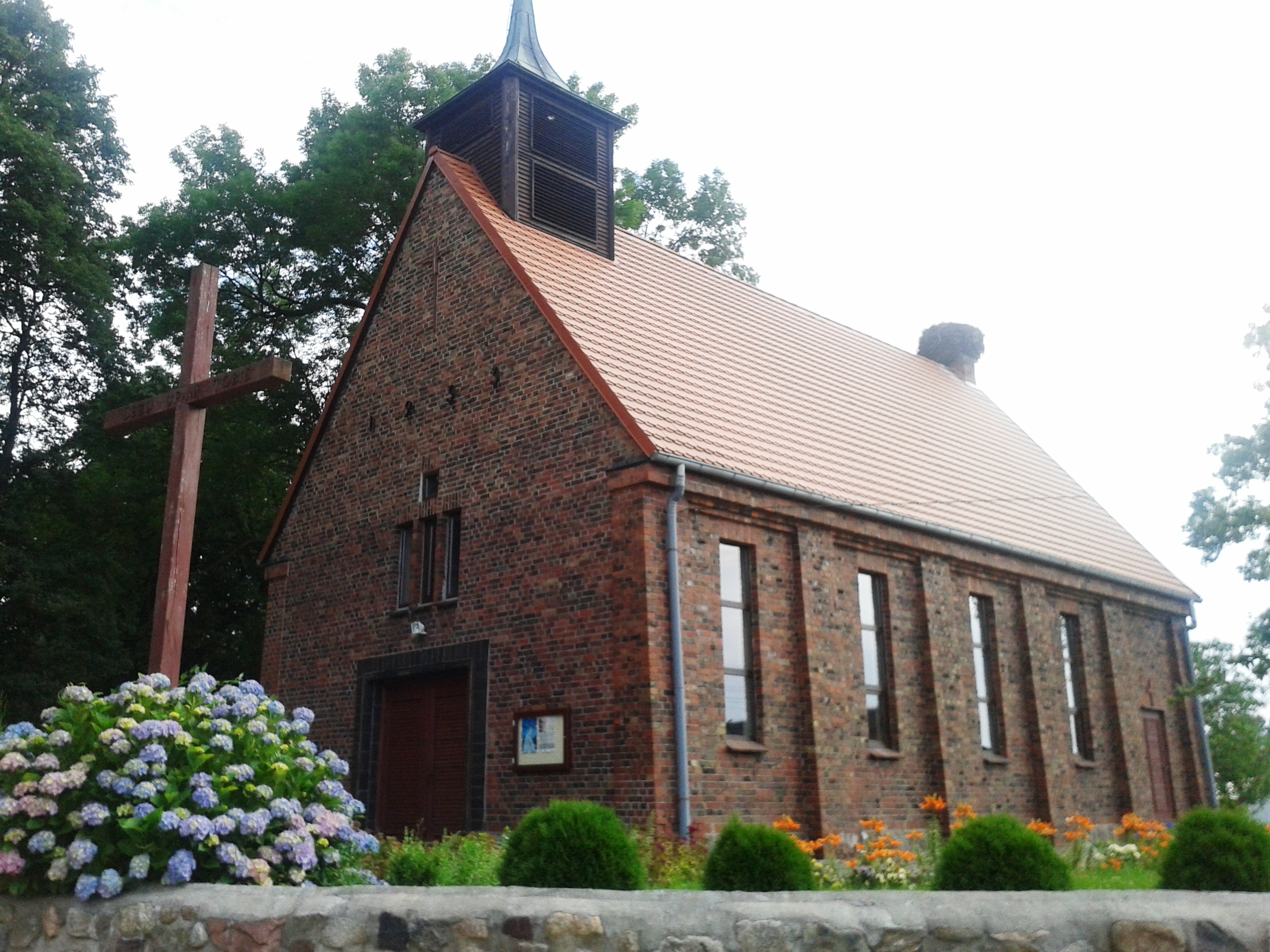
- Wilczkowo - church

- Location within Poland
- Coordinates: 53°43′38″N 15°46′38″E
- Country: Poland
- Voivodeship: West Pomeranian
- County: Świdwin
- Gmina: Brzeżno

Wilczkowo [vilt͡ʂˈkɔvɔ] (German: Völzkow) is a settlement in the administrative district of Gmina Brzeżno, within Świdwin County, West Pomeranian Voivodeship, in north-western Poland. It lies approximately 7 km (4 mi) south of Świdwin and 87 km (54 mi) north-east of the regional capital Szczecin.

== See also ==
- History of Pomerania
