= Chomętówko =

- Village
- Location within Poland
- Coordinates: 53°43′44″N 15°50′28″E
- Country: Poland
- Voivodeship: West Pomeranian
- County: Świdwin
- Gmina: Brzeżno

Chomętówko [xɔmɛnˈtufkɔ] (German: Kolonie Gumtow) is a village in the administrative district of Gmina Brzeżno, within Świdwin County, West Pomeranian Voivodeship, in north-western Poland.
