= Gmina Suchań =

Gmina Suchań Suchań Commune
- Gmina
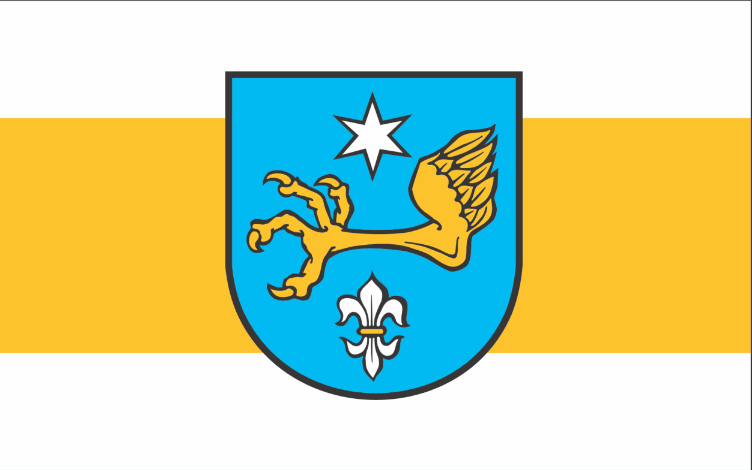
- Flag Coat of arms
- Interactive map of Gmina Suchań
- Coordinates (Suchań): 53°16′43″N 15°19′29″E
- Country: Poland
- Voivodeship: West Pomeranian
- County: Stargard
- Seat: Suchań

Area
  - Total: 132.80 km^{2} (51.27 sq mi)

Population (2006)
  - Total: 4,324
  - Density: 32.56/km^{2} (84.33/sq mi)
  - Urban: 1,446
  - Rural: 2,878
- Website: http://www.suchan.pl/

Gmina Suchań is an urban-rural gmina (administrative district) in Stargard County, West Pomeranian Voivodeship, in north-western Poland. Its seat is the town of Suchań, which lies approximately 21 kilometres (13 mi) east of Stargard and 52 km (32 mi) east of the regional capital Szczecin.

The gmina covers an area of 132.80 square kilometres (51.3 sq mi), and as of 2006 its total population is 4,324 (out of which the population of Suchań amounts to 1,446, and the population of the rural part of the gmina is 2,878).

== Villages ==
Apart from the town of Suchań, Gmina Suchań contains the villages and settlements of Brudzewice, Ininy, Kolonia Brudzewice, Kolonia Zaolzie, Modrzewo, Nosowo, Podłęcze, Sadłowo, Słodkówko, Słodkowo, Suchanki, Suchanówko, Tarnowo, Wapnica, Zastawie and Żukowo.

== Neighbouring gminas ==
Gmina Suchań is bordered by the gminas of Choszczno, Dobrzany, Dolice, Marianowo, Recz and Stargard.
