= Reńsko, West Pomeranian Voivodeship =

Reńsko
- Village
- Location within Poland
- Coordinates: 53°14′09″N 14°57′31″E
- Country: Poland
- Voivodeship: West Pomeranian
- County: Pyrzyce
- Gmina: Warnice

Reńsko [ˈrɛɲskɔ] (German: Schönbrunn) is a village in the administrative district of Gmina Warnice, within Pyrzyce County, West Pomeranian Voivodeship, in north-western Poland.

== See also ==
- History of Pomerania
