= Pustelnia, West Pomeranian Voivodeship =

Pustelnia
- Settlement
- Location within Poland
- Coordinates: 53°07′26″N 15°59′23″E
- Country: Poland
- Voivodeship: West Pomeranian
- County: Wałcz
- Gmina: Człopa

Population
  - Total: 1
- Time zone: UTC+1 (CET)
  - Summer (DST): UTC+2 (CEST)
- Vehicle registration: ZWA

Pustelnia [pusˈtɛlɲa] (formerly German: Salmer Teerofen) is a settlement in the administrative district of Gmina Człopa, within Wałcz County, West Pomeranian Voivodeship, in north-western Poland.

The settlement has a population of 1.

== History ==
The area was part of the Kingdom of Poland until the First Partition of Poland in 1772, then part of Prussia and Germany in 1772–1945. It became again part of Poland following the defeat of Germany in World War II in 1945.
