= Stary Przylep =

- Village
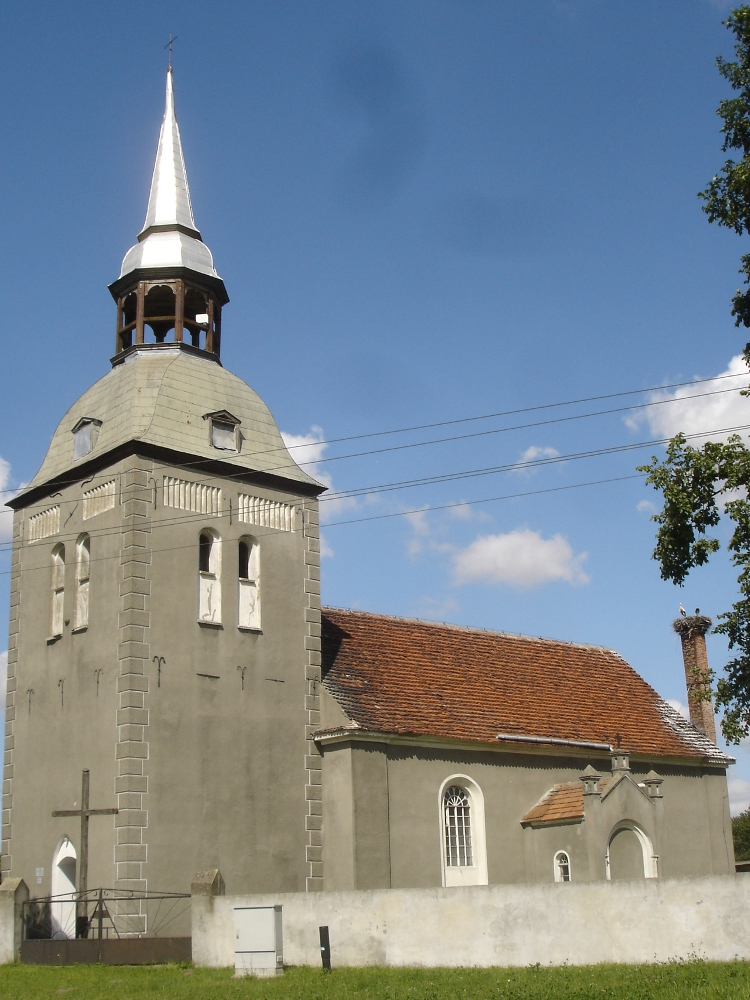

- Location within Poland
- Coordinates: 53°12′00″N 14°59′25″E
- Country: Poland
- Voivodeship: West Pomeranian
- County: Pyrzyce
- Gmina: Warnice

Stary Przylep [ˈstarɨ ˈpʂɨlɛp] (German: Alt Prilipp) is a village in the administrative district of Gmina Warnice, within Pyrzyce County, West Pomeranian Voivodeship, in north-western Poland.

== See also ==
- History of Pomerania
