= Bukowo, Wałcz County =

Bukowo
- Village
- Location within Poland
- Coordinates: 53°6′N 16°12′E
- Country: Poland
- Voivodeship: West Pomeranian
- County: Wałcz
- Gmina: Człopa

Bukowo [buˈkɔvɔ] (German: Buchholz) is a village in the administrative district of Gmina Człopa, within Wałcz County, West Pomeranian Voivodeship, in north-western Poland. It lies approximately 5 km (3 mi) north-east of Człopa, 26 km (16 mi) south-west of Wałcz, and 114 km (71 mi) east of the regional capital Szczecin.
