= Wójcin, West Pomeranian Voivodeship =

Wójcin
- Village
- Location within Poland
- Coordinates: 53°13′35″N 15°02′04″E
- Country: Poland
- Voivodeship: West Pomeranian
- County: Pyrzyce
- Gmina: Warnice

Wójcin [ˈvui̯t͡ɕin] (German: Waitendorf) is a village in the administrative district of Gmina Warnice, within Pyrzyce County, West Pomeranian Voivodeship, in north-western Poland.

== See also ==
- History of Pomerania
