= Nowy Przylep =

- Village
- Location within Poland
- Coordinates: 53°12′54″N 15°01′11″E
- Country: Poland
- Voivodeship: West Pomeranian
- County: Pyrzyce
- Gmina: Warnice

Nowy Przylep [ˈnɔvɨ ˈpʂɨlɛp] (German: Neu Prilipp) is a village in the administrative district of Gmina Warnice, within Pyrzyce County, West Pomeranian Voivodeship, in north-western Poland.

== See also ==
History of Pomerania
