= Barnim (name) =

Barnim is a Pomeranian Slavic origin given name derived from names: Barnimir, Barnisław (which contain word "barni, broni" - to protect Notable people with the name include:

- Barnim I the Good (1217–1278), duke of Pomerania
- Barnim II (1277–1295), duke of Pomerania-Stettin
- Barnim III the Great (1300–1368), duke of Pomerania-Stettin
- Barnim IV the Good (1325–1365), duke of Pomerania-Wolgast
- Barnim V (1369–1403), duke of Pomerania-Schlawe-Stolp
- Barnim VI (1365–1405), duke of Pomerania-Wolgast and Barth
- Barnim VII (1403–1451), duke of Pomerania-Wolgast
- Barnim VIII (1405–1451), duke of Pomerania-Barth-Rügen-->
- Barnim IX (1501–1573), also known as Barnim XI the Old, duke of Pomerania-Stettin
- Barnim X (1549–1603), also known as Barnim XII, duke of Pomerania-Rügenwalde and Bütow
- Wilhelm Barnim Dames, German paleontologist
