= Gmina Brzeżno =

Gmina Brzeżno Brzeżno Commune
- Gmina
- Coat of arms
- Interactive map of Gmina Brzeżno
- Coordinates (Brzeżno): 53°43′N 15°46′E
- Country: Poland
- Voivodeship: West Pomeranian
- County: Świdwin
- Seat: Brzeżno

Area
  - Total: 110.84 km^{2} (42.80 sq mi)

Population (2006)
  - Total: 2,856
  - Density: 25.77/km^{2} (66.74/sq mi)
- Website: http://www.brzezno.pl/

Gmina Brzeżno is a rural gmina (administrative district) in Świdwin County, West Pomeranian Voivodeship, in north-western Poland. Its seat is the village of Brzeżno, which lies approximately 12 kilometres (7 mi) south of Świdwin and 80 km (50 mi) north-east of the regional capital Szczecin.

The gmina covers an area of 110.84 square kilometres (42.8 sq mi). As of 2006, its total population is 2,856.

== Villages ==
Gmina Brzeżno contains the villages and settlements of Brzeżno, Chomętówko, Chomętowo, Grąbczewo, Grądzkie, Karsibór, Kłącko, Koszanowo, Miłoszewice, Mulite, Pęczerzyno, Pęczerzyński Młyn, Półchleb, Przyrzecze, Rzepczyno, Słonowice, Sonino, Więcław and Wilczkowo.

== Neighbouring gminas ==
Gmina Brzeżno is bordered by the town of Świdwin and by the gminas of Drawsko Pomorskie, Łobez, Ostrowice and Świdwin.
