= Jeleni Róg =

- Settlement
- Location within Poland
- Coordinates: 53°05′40″N 16°01′51″E
- Country: Poland
- Voivodeship: West Pomeranian
- County: Wałcz
- Gmina: Człopa

Population
  - Total: 6
- Time zone: UTC+1 (CET)
  - Summer (DST): UTC+2 (CEST)
- Vehicle registration: ZWA

Jeleni Róg [jɛˈlɛni ˈruk] (formerly German: Dype, or Düpe) is a settlement in the administrative district of Gmina Człopa, within Wałcz County, West Pomeranian Voivodeship, in north-western Poland.

The settlement has a population of 6.
