= Grędziec =

- Village
- Location within Poland
- Coordinates: 53°12′44″N 14°56′16″E
- Country: Poland
- Voivodeship: West Pomeranian
- County: Pyrzyce
- Gmina: Warnice

Grędziec [ˈɡrɛnd͡ʑɛt͡s] (German: Schöningen) is a village in the administrative district of Gmina Warnice, within Pyrzyce County, West Pomeranian Voivodeship, in north-western Poland.

== See also ==
- History of Pomerania
