= Dzwonowo, Wałcz County =

Dzwonowo
- Village
- Location within Poland
- Coordinates: 53°04′12″N 16°05′12″E
- Country: Poland
- Voivodeship: West Pomeranian
- County: Wałcz
- Gmina: Człopa
- Postal code: 78-630
- Area code: +48 67

Dzwonowo [d͡zvɔˈnɔvɔ] (German: Schönow) is a village in the administrative district of Gmina Człopa, within Wałcz County, West Pomeranian Voivodeship, in north-western Poland.
