= Brzeżno =

- Village
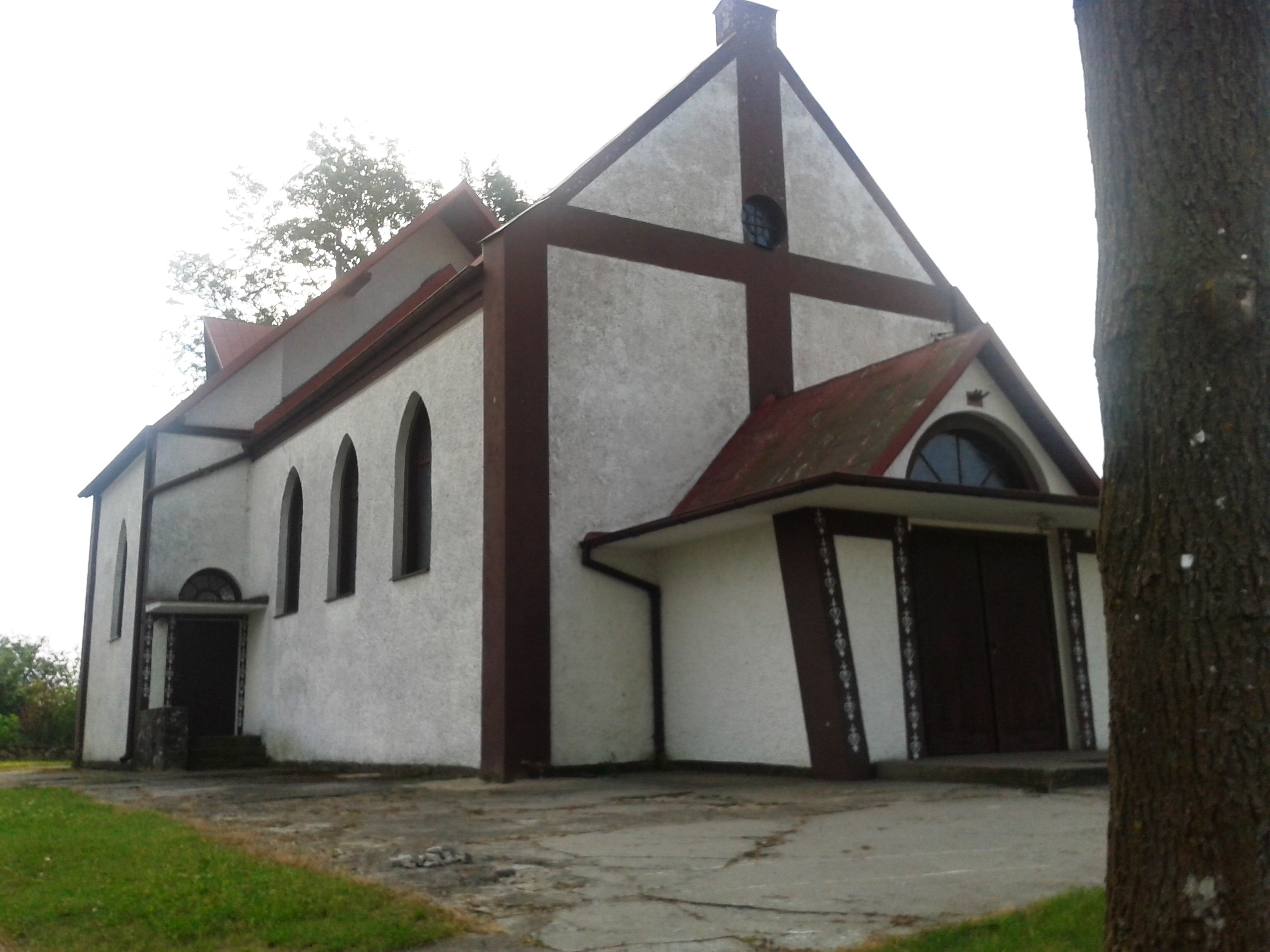
- Brzeżno - church

- Location within Poland
- Coordinates: 53°43′N 15°46′E
- Country: Poland
- Voivodeship: West Pomeranian
- County: Świdwin
- Gmina: Brzeżno
- Population: 970

Brzeżno [ˈbʐɛʐnɔ] (formerly German: Briesen bei Schivelbein) is a village in Świdwin County, West Pomeranian Voivodeship, in north-western Poland. It is the seat of the gmina (administrative district) called Gmina Brzeżno. It lies approximately 8 km (5 mi) south of Świdwin and 86 km (53 mi) north-east of the regional capital Szczecin.

For the history of the region, see History of Pomerania.

The village has a population of 970.
