= Warnice, Pyrzyce County =

Warnice
- Village
- Location within Poland
- Coordinates: 53°15′N 14°59′E
- Country: Poland
- Voivodeship: West Pomeranian
- County: Pyrzyce
- Gmina: Warnice
- Website: http://warnice.pl

Warnice [varˈnit͡sɛ] (German: Warnitz) is a village in Pyrzyce County, West Pomeranian Voivodeship, in north-western Poland. It is the seat of the gmina (administrative district) called Gmina Warnice. It lies approximately 15 km (9 mi) north-east of Pyrzyce and 33 km (21 mi) south-east of the regional capital Szczecin.

== See also ==
- History of Pomerania
