= Suchań =

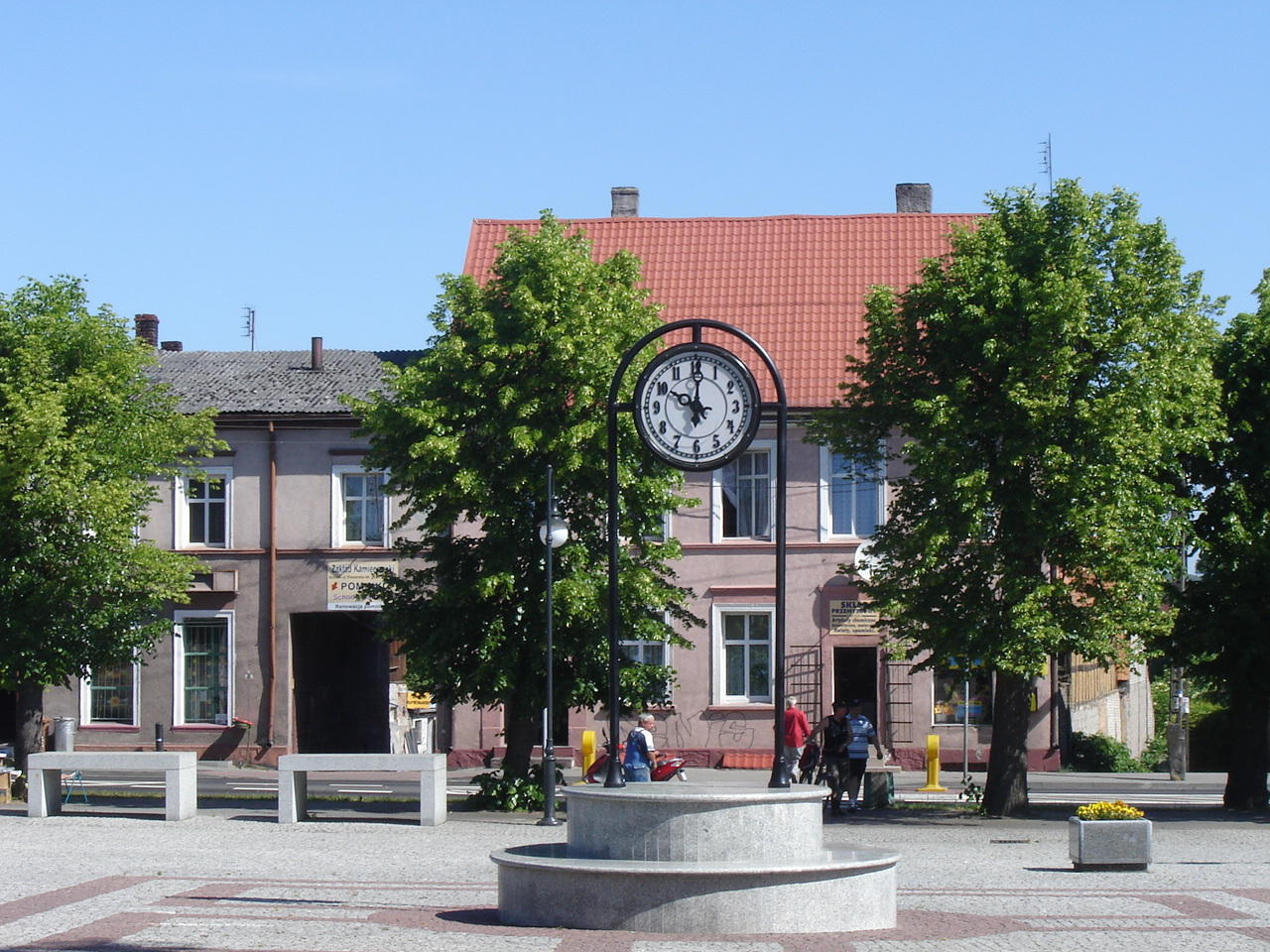
- Market Square (Rynek)

- Coat of arms

- Location within Poland
- Coordinates: 53°16′43″N 15°19′29″E
- Country: Poland
- Voivodeship: West Pomeranian
- County: Stargard
- Gmina: Suchań
- Established: 10th century
- First mentioned: 1269

Government
  - Mayor: Stanisława Bodnar

Area
  - Total: 3.57 km^{2} (1.38 sq mi)

Population (2018)
  - Total: 1,490
  - Density: 417/km^{2} (1,080/sq mi)
- Time zone: UTC+1 (CET)
  - Summer (DST): UTC+2 (CEST)
- Area code: +48 91
- Vehicle registration: ZST
- Website: http://www.suchan.pl/

Suchań [ˈsuxaɲ] (German: Zachan) is a town in Stargard County, West Pomeranian Voivodeship, in north-western Poland. It is the seat of Gmina Suchań. Its recorded population is 1,490 (2018).

Suchań is positioned on the Reczek river, a tributary of the Ina which in turn feeds into the River Oder.

The town's main historic landmarks are the Gothic church of Our Lady of Perpetual Help and the old watermill.

== History ==
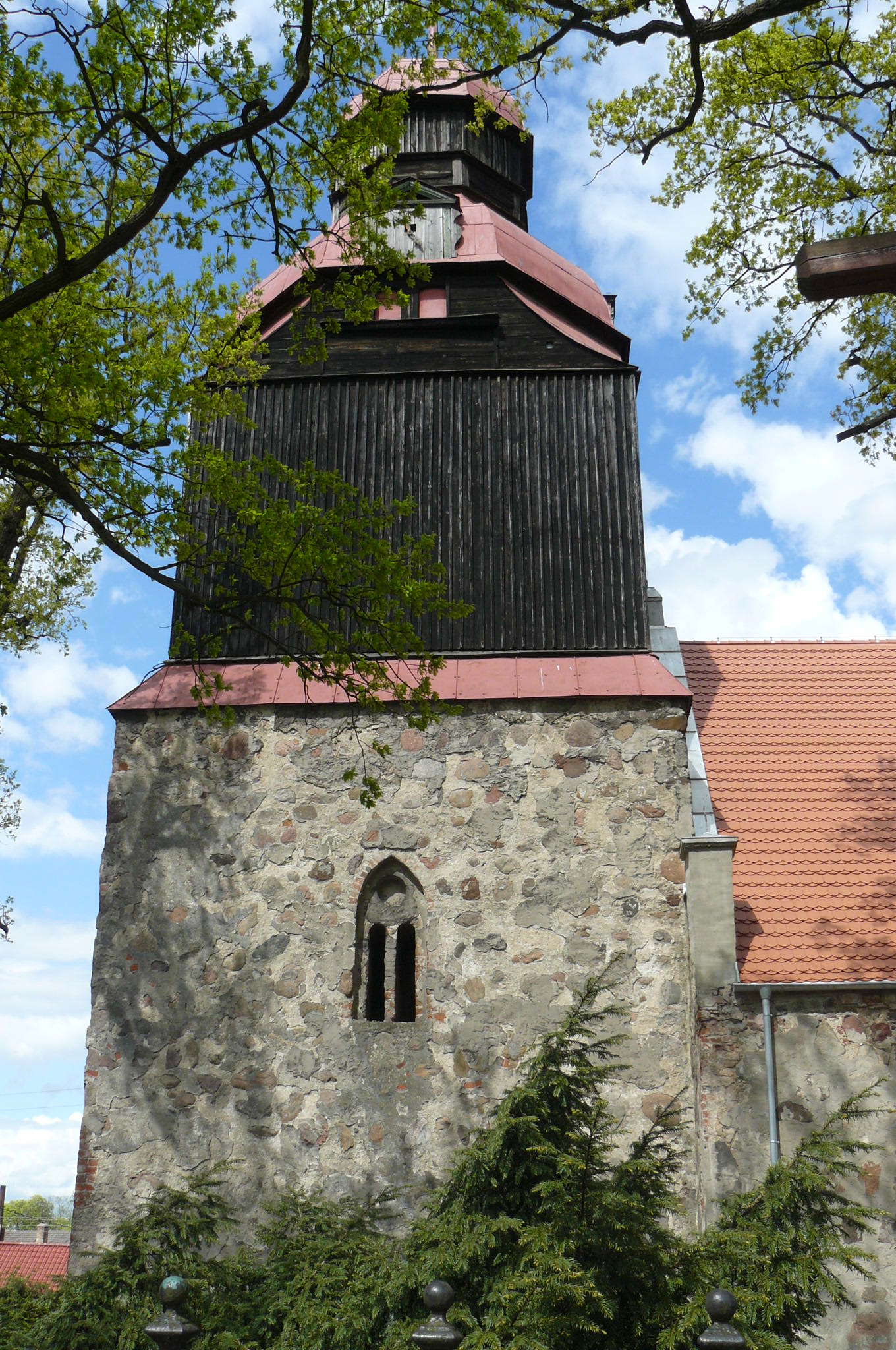
Gothic church of Our Lady of Perpetual Help

The area became part of the emerging Duchy of Poland in 967. A stronghold was founded in the 10th century. As a result of the mid-12th century fragmentation of Kingdom of Poland, it became part of the separate Duchy of Pomerania ruled by the House of Griffin. The oldest known mention of the settlement comes from 1269, and it was granted town rights by 1487. Probably in the 13th century, a castle was built, which from 1312 to 1382 served as the seat of a commandry of the Knights Hospitaller. The town's coat of arms still refers to the Griffins and the Knights Hospitaller. In 1653 it was annexed by the Margraviate of Brandenburg, from 1701 it was part of Prussia, and from 1871 to 1945 it was also part Germany. After the defeat of Nazi Germany in World War II, Suchań became again part of Poland in 1945.

== Demographics ==
Historical population

Year	Pop.	±%
1871	1,481	—
1880	1,477	−0.3%
1890	1,448	−2.0%
1900	1,500	+3.6%
1910	1,600	+6.7%
1925	1,100	−31.2%

Year	Pop.	±%
1939	1,302	+18.4%
1950	917	−29.6%
1960	1,158	+26.3%
1978	1,254	+8.3%
1988	1,315	+4.9%
2010	1,436	+9.2%

== Transport ==
Suchań lies on the junction of national road 10 with voivodeship road 160.

The nearest railway station is Tarnowo Pomorskie.

== Sports ==
The local football team is Orkan Suchań. It competes in the lower leagues.
