= Człopa =

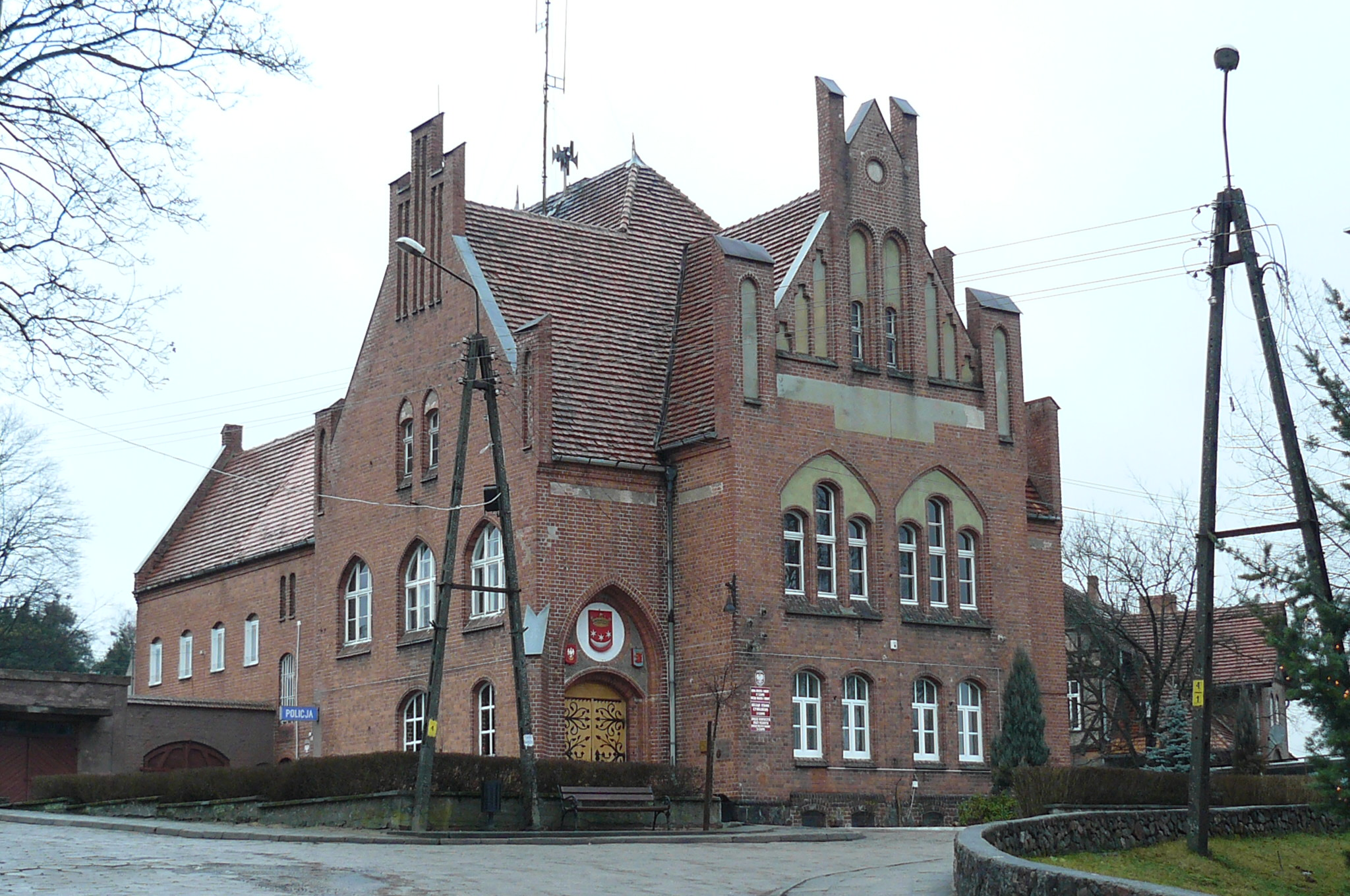
- Town hall

- Flag Coat of arms

- Location within Poland
- Coordinates: 53°5′N 16°8′E
- Country: Poland
- Voivodeship: West Pomeranian
- County: Wałcz
- Gmina: Człopa
- Established: 12th century
- Town rights: 1245

Government
  - Mayor: Jerzy Bekker

Area
  - Total: 6.33 km^{2} (2.44 sq mi)

Population (31 December 2021)
  - Total: 2,277
  - Density: 360/km^{2} (932/sq mi)
- Time zone: UTC+1 (CET)
  - Summer (DST): UTC+2 (CEST)
- Postal code: 78-630
- Area code: +48 67
- Vehicle registration: ZWA
- Website: http://www.czlopa.pl

Człopa [ˈt͡ʂwɔpa] (German: Schloppe) is a town in Wałcz County of the West Pomeranian Voivodeship in western Poland. As of December 2021, it has a population of 2,277.

Located in the Wałcz Lake District on three lakes, Człopa is just east of the scenic Drawska Wilderness area which includes Drawieński National Park.

== History ==
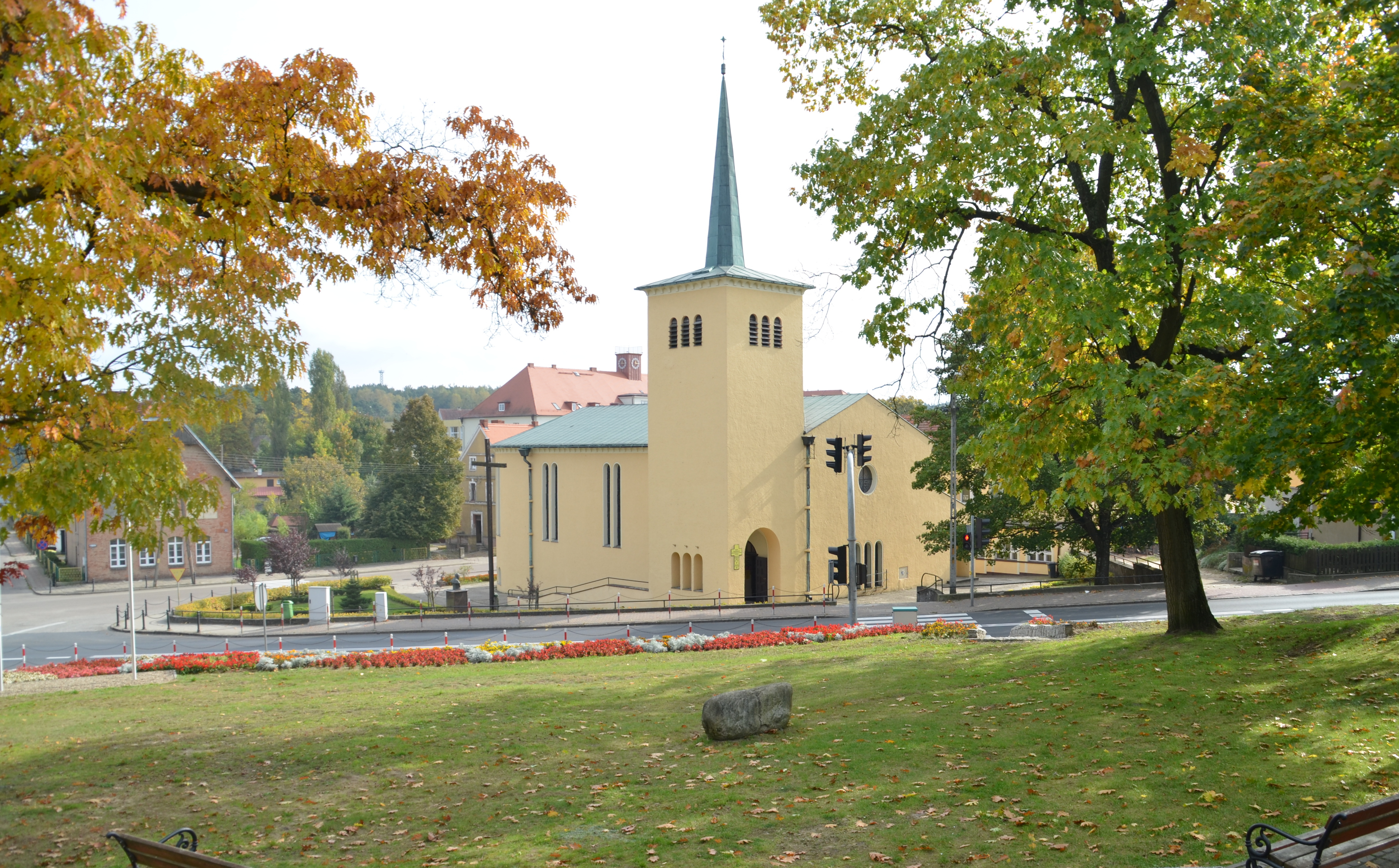
Saint Anthony church in Człopa

Viritium, a Germanic city in the 2nd century as shown on the map of Greek geographer Ptolemy, existed at the site of present-day Człopa.

Człopa is an ancient town that was part of Poland since the 12th century, guarding its northern and western borders after the loss of the areas located more north and west. By 1245 Człopa was granted town rights. By the end of the 13th century, the Czarnkowski family of the Nałęcz szlachta received possession of the region around Człopa from Przemysł II, Duke of Greater Poland. The grant included permission to raise a hill-fort. Only portions of the hill-fort's walls have survived to the present time. In the early 14th century the town was briefly occupied by the Margraviate of Brandenburg, before it was recovered by Polish King Casimir III the Great in 1368. In 1406 it was ravaged by the Teutonic Knights. Administratively it was located in the Poznań Voivodeship in the Greater Poland Province. Człopa belonged to various Polish noble families, including Opaliński, Leszczyński, Poniatowski and Sułkowski. One of the most famous owners was the Queen consort of Poland Catherine Opalińska, wife of King Stanisław Leszczyński. The oldest known image of Człopa's coat of arms dates back to 1601. During the Swedish occupation of Poland, in 1658, a concentration of Polish troops led by Stefan Czarniecki, a national hero of Poland, was ordered near Człopa.

Człopa was annexed by Prussia in 1772 during the First Partition of Poland. From 1806 to 1814 it was controlled by France. From 1871 it was part of Germany and the post-World War II Treaty of Versailles did not restore the town, along with the northern outskirts of historic Greater Poland, to the re-established Polish Republic. In the final stages of World War II, in January 1945, the Germans evacuated the town's population. From January 29 to February 3, heavy fighting took place there between Nazi Germany and the Soviet Union. After the war, the town eventually returned to Poland.

During the years 1975 to 1998, the city was administratively part of the Piła Voivodeship.

== Demographics ==
Historical population

Year	Pop.	±%
1880	2,156	—
1890	2,232	+3.5%
1900	2,228	−0.2%
1910	1,957	−12.2%
1925	2,424	+23.9%

Year	Pop.	±%
1933	2,853	+17.7%
1950	1,335	−53.2%
1960	1,859	+39.3%
2010	2,354	+26.6%

== Transport ==
National road 22 from Kostrzyn nad Odrą to Braniewo passes through Człopa as does regional road 177. One rail line passes through the city, but service has been discontinued for a number of years.

== Notable people ==
- Richard Bock (1865–1949) an American sculptor and associate of Frank Lloyd Wright.
- Jacek Ratajczak (born 1973) a retired Polish footballer
