= Józef Biss =

Polish military officer (1913–1977)

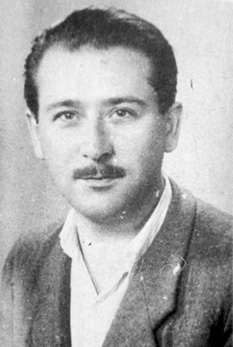
- Born: July 24, 1913; Lwów, Kingdom of Galicia and Lodomeria, Austria-Hungary
- Died: September 30, 1977 (aged 64); Opole, Poland
- Military career
- Branch: Polish Army (1935-1939); Home Army (1940-1945)
- Service years: 1935–1945
- Rank: Podporucznik (second lieutenant)
- Conflicts: World War II: Invasion of Poland; Battle of Lwów (POW); Operation Tempest; Warsaw Uprising

Józef Biss (pseudonym: Wacław, July 24, 1913 – September 30, 1977) was a Polish military officer, serving as a podporucznik (second lieutenant) of the Polish Army. From spring of 1944, he commanded a company within the 26th regiment of the Home Army. He was the commander of the unit which carried out the Pawłokoma massacre.

== Early life and education ==
Józef Biss was born on July 24, 1913, in Lwów (now Lviv, Ukraine) to Stanisław and Władysława. He graduated from a pedagogy school. In September 1935, Bliss served in the 48th Infantry Regiment of the Polish Army in Stanisławów (now Ivano-Frankivsk in western Ukraine). In January 1938, he received the rank of podporucznik (equivalent to second lieutenant).

== Second World War ==
During the invasion of Poland in September 1939, Biss commanded a Polish Army company. He was captured by the Germans near Lwów, but after a few days in detention, he escaped. He stayed in eastern Poland, which was annexed by the Soviet Union. Before the German invasion in USSR started in June 1941, Biss worked as a teacher in the Kołomyja area, where he also joined the Polish resistance. In November 1940, he started serving in the Union of Armed Struggle (ZWZ), a precursor of the Home Army, which he subsequently joined.

In the spring of 1944, Biss became a company commander in the 26th Infantry Regiment of the Home Army around the village of Siemianówka near Lwów. According to Grzegorz Rąkowski, after the Red Army offensive encircled eight Nazi divisions at Brody, the Home Army launched Operation Tempest in the area. Rąkowski writes that on July 26, 1944, troops commanded by Biss stopped an attack by the 14th Waffen Grenadier Division of the SS (Galicia). Later in July 1944, his troops were disarmed by the Soviet Red Army and released to their homes. A few weeks after being disarmed, Biss was ordered by the Home Army command to reform his unit and march to assist the Warsaw Uprising. However, Biss's troops only managed to reach the Lublin region, where they settled for the winter.

=== Pawłokoma massacre ===
On March 3, 1945, Biss' unit carried out a massacre of Ukrainian civilians in the village of Pawłokoma, in today's Subcarpathian Voivodship, Poland. The reason for this attack is rather unknown but could include increased animosity between Ukrainians and Poles, a will to revenge the kidnapping and murder of seven Poles in the village, who were thought to be executed by the Ukrainian Insurgent Army (UPA) soldiers, or a premeditated operation aimed at destroying the village and getting rid of the local Ukrainian population, a version endorsed by Eugeniusz Misiło. Estimates of the number of victims vary from 80 to 500 Ukrainian civilians.

== Fights with NKVD and capture ==
A few days after the massacre, the local Home Army mistakenly attacked a NKVD unit that they thought was an UPA unit. In the fight near Dynów one man from Biss's unit was killed and several were wounded. The fight was interrupted after the units realized the mistake. Afterwards Biss's unit withdrew to Dylągowa and then to Laskówka on the other bank of the San river, and then to dugouts in the forest near Zmysłówka.

On May 29, 1945, the camp in the forests near Zmysłówka came under strong attack by NKVD troops. In the fight Biss, his second-in-command Żypowski, women commander Trojanowska, and a few soldiers were captured by the NKVD. Most of the soldiers of the detachment managed to escape. Biss and his insurgents were taken to the Voivode Office of Public Security (WUBP) detention center in Rzeszów.

== Post-war trial, imprisonment ==
Despite having documents from Biss's unit indicating that they attacked Ukrainian civilians, Biss was not questioned on this matter at the WUBP. Charges against Biss and his colleagues were nearly dropped, under the amnesty decree, during the military court proceedings of August 14 and September 3. However, in a September 4 hearing Biss admitted to have authored a February 6, 1945, report to the Lwów region Home Army commander in which, under the heading "liquidation", he described the execution of Communists on three different occasions. The court-martial sentenced Biss to seven years in prison, with the term immediately reduced to two years under the amnesty decree. At the request of the public prosecutor's office, this reduction of the prison term was later annulled by the Supreme Military Court and the original term of seven years was restored. Biss's associates were sentenced to terms of between two and five years. However, on May 21, 1947, under a new amnesty decree the military court reduced his term to three years and six months, and he was released from prison on November 29, 1948.

On September 3, 1949, Biss was arrested by the Office of Public Security (UBP) again because he maintained connections with his former associate Żypowski. He was released on January 4, 1950. After his release he started work at the bus station in Opole, where he renewed contact with Edward Cieśla, a former Home Army soldier he had met in prison. Biss quit his job in June 1950, and started committing robberies with Ciesla.

In a robbery against a dairy in Dobrowice in June, Biss and partners stole 3 million Polish złoty (PLZ). In an October 23 robbery the same year, Biss and Cieśla, stole 110,000 PLZ from the register of the "Granit" government cooperative in Dzieszkowo. On November 11, Biss's associates Żmura and Cieśla attempted to rob a government cooperative in Opole but were captured by the Milicja Obywatelska. Biss went into hiding with the Kupiński family, but after Cieśla described Biss in his interrogation, Biss was arrested on January 25, 1951, and was shot in the lung while attempting to escape. He was then sentenced to 8 years in prison for the robberies. Biss testified in court that his motivation for the robberies was to help his friends who had been in prison, however, according to the interrogations, no such funds were transferred. The gang spent 550,000 PLZ on purchasing a passenger car which was used in the robberies, and the rest of the loot was allocated to their own expenses. In 1955, he was released on parole.

In 1952, Polish authorities investigated Czesław Sputa and Roman Tworzydlo who were in Biss' unit. During their investigation they uncovered the Pawłokoma massacre and dug up one of the three mass graves in the village. Sputa and Tworzydlo were convicted for their participation in the massacre of Ukrainian civilians. However, despite the investigation and court proceedings proving beyond any doubt that he had commanded the operation and personally oversaw the executions, Biss was not investigated or placed on trial.

== Death and legacy ==
On September 30, 1977, Biss died in Opole.

In 1991, at the request of his son, a court in Rzeszów vacated the charges of robbery against Biss on the basis that the robberies were carried out in connection with the anti-communist resistance. In 1992, the Rzeszów court ordered that compensation be paid to Biss's family and also cancelled the military court verdict from September 4, 1945.
