= Baravykas =

- Lithuanian surname
- m.: Baravykas
- f.: (unmarried): Baravykaitė
- f.: (married): Baravykienė
- Related names: Borowik, Borovik

Baravykas is a Lithuanian surname. Notable people with the surname include:

- Rolandas Baravykas
- Gediminas Baravykas
