= Borowik =

Borowik may refer to:

- Borowik, West Pomeranian Voivodeship, Poland
- Irena Borowik (born 1956), Polish publisher and professor of religious studies
- Wojciech Borowik (1956–2020), Polish politician

== See also ==
- Borowiki, Podlaskie Voivodeship, Poland
- Borówki, Podkarpackie Voivodeship, Poland
- Borovik (disambiguation)
