= Bachórz =

Bachórz may refer to:

- Bachórz, Podkarpackie Voivodeship, a village in Podkarpackie Voivodeship, Poland
- Bachórz River (pl:Bachórz (potok)), a tributary of the Vistula
- Józef Bachórz, Polish philologist
- Simón Bajour, violinist, born Szymon Bachórz
