= Budzieszewice =

- Village
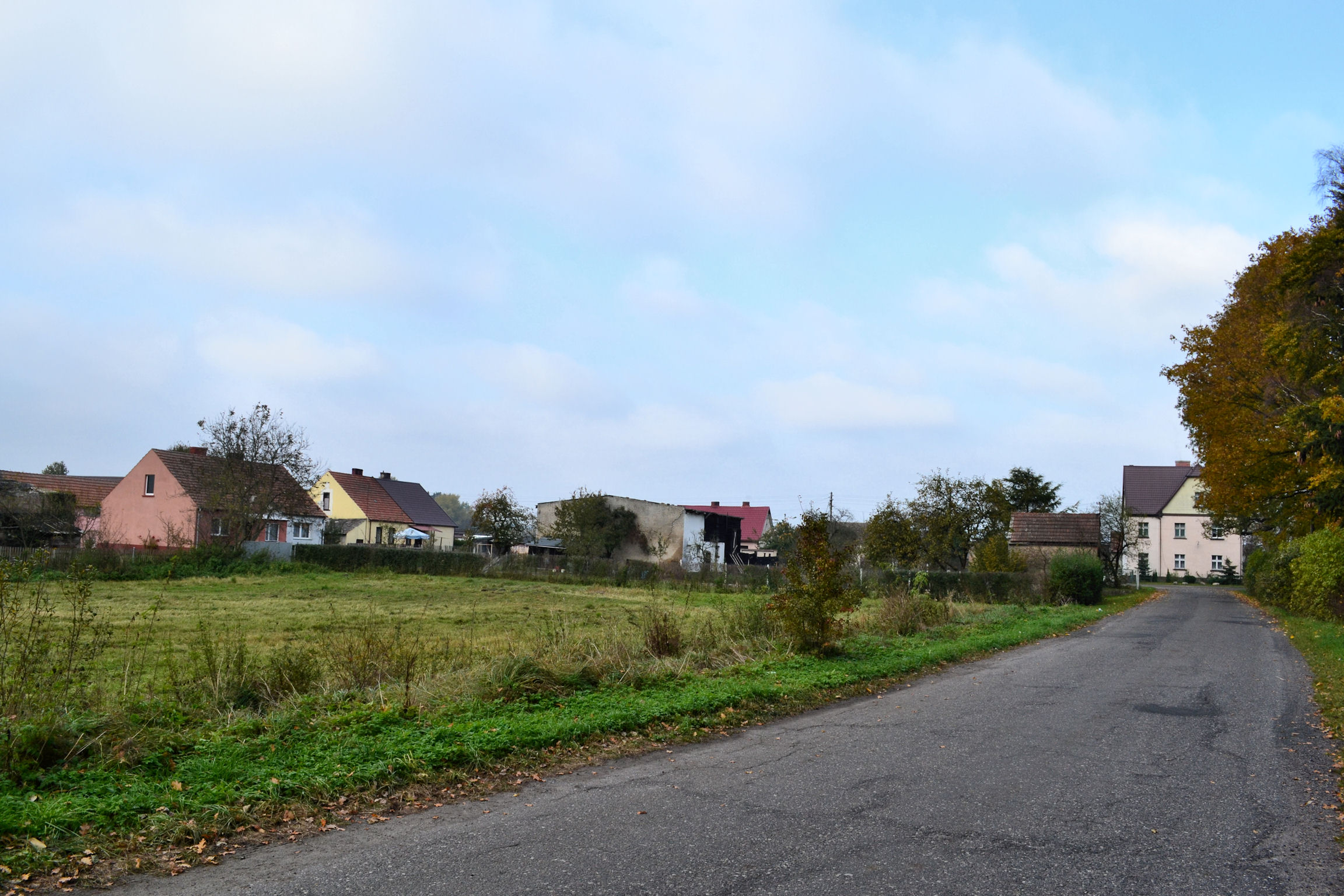

- Location within Poland
- Coordinates: 53°41′39″N 14°51′18″E
- Country: Poland
- Voivodeship: West Pomeranian
- County: Goleniów
- Gmina: Przybiernów

Budzieszewice [bud͡ʑɛʂɛˈvit͡sɛ] (German: Lütmannshagen) is a village in the administrative district of Gmina Przybiernów, within Goleniów County, West Pomeranian Voivodeship, in north-western Poland. It lies approximately 9 km (6 mi) south-east of Przybiernów, 17 km (11 mi) north of Goleniów, and 36 km (22 mi) north-east of the regional capital Szczecin.
