= Trzebianowo =

- Settlement
- Location within Poland
- Coordinates: 53°48′N 14°44′E
- Country: Poland
- Voivodeship: West Pomeranian
- County: Goleniów
- Gmina: Przybiernów

Trzebianowo [tʂɛbjaˈnɔvɔ] (German: Trebenow) is a settlement in the administrative district of Gmina Przybiernów, within Goleniów County, West Pomeranian Voivodeship, in north-western Poland. It lies approximately 6 km (4 mi) north-west of Przybiernów, 29 km (18 mi) north of Goleniów, and 44 km (27 mi) north of the regional capital Szczecin.
