= Leszczno =

- Village
- Location within Poland
- Coordinates: 53°47′58″N 14°52′51″E
- Country: Poland
- Voivodeship: West Pomeranian
- County: Goleniów
- Gmina: Przybiernów

Leszczno [ˈlɛʂt͡ʂnɔ] (German: Holzhagen) is a village in the administrative district of Gmina Przybiernów, within Goleniów County, West Pomeranian Voivodeship, in north-western Poland. It lies approximately 10 km (6 mi) north-east of Przybiernów, 28 km (17 mi) north of Goleniów, and 47 km (29 mi) north-east of the regional capital Szczecin.

In the 960s the area became part of Poland after Mieszko I defeated the local Slavic tribes. From 1871 to 1945 the area was part of Germany. For the history of the region, see History of Pomerania.
