= Harta =

Harta may refer to:

- Harta (magazine), a Japanese seinen manga magazine published by Enterbrain
- Harta, Hungary
- Harta, Poland
