= Brzozowo, Gmina Przybiernów =

Brzozowo
- Village
- Location within Poland
- Coordinates: 53°47′30″N 14°45′33″E
- Country: Poland
- Voivodeship: West Pomeranian
- County: Goleniów
- Gmina: Przybiernów

Brzozowo [bʐɔˈzɔvɔ] is a village in the administrative district of Gmina Przybiernów, within Goleniów County, West Pomeranian Voivodeship, in north-western Poland. It lies approximately 5 km (3 mi) north of Przybiernów, 28 km (17 mi) north of Goleniów, and 44 km (27 mi) north of the regional capital Szczecin.
