= Dicking =

Dicking may refer to:

- Derkacze (German: Dicking), a village in Lubusz Voivodeship, western Poland
- Derkacz (German: Dicking), a settlement in West Pomeranian Voivodeship, northwestern Poland

== See also ==
- Dick (disambiguation)
- Dickin, an English and Irish surname
- Docking (disambiguation)
- Ducking, an audio effect
