= Buk, Goleniów County =

Buk
- Settlement
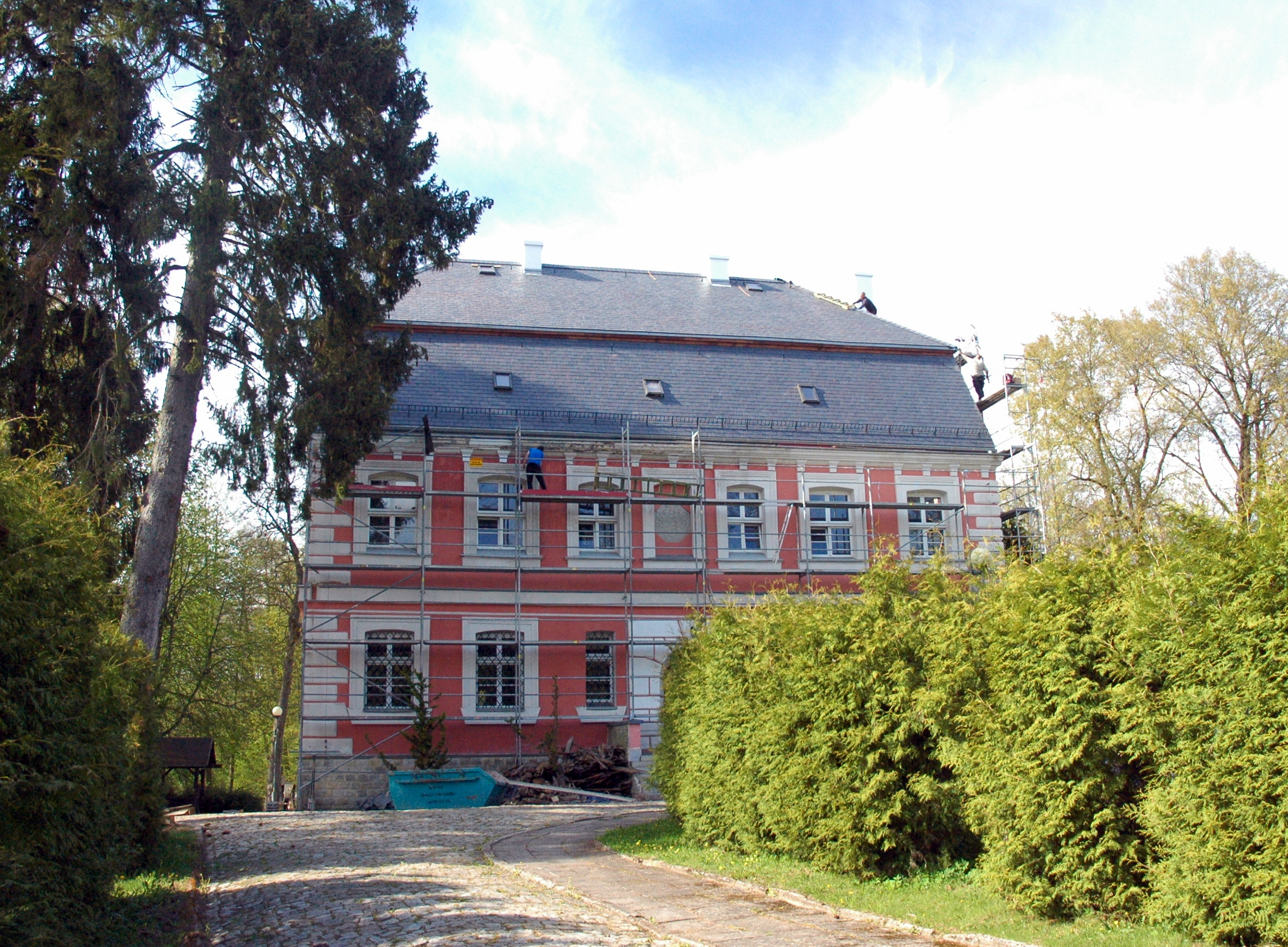
- Manor house during renovation in 2023

- Location within Poland
- Coordinates: 53°46′10″N 14°57′10″E
- Country: Poland
- Voivodeship: West Pomeranian
- County: Goleniów
- Gmina: Przybiernów
- Elevation: 200 m (660 ft)

Population
  - Total: 33
- Time zone: UTC+1 (CET)
  - Summer (DST): UTC+2 (CEST)
- Vehicle registration: ZGL

Buk [buk] (German: Böck) is a settlement in the administrative district of Gmina Przybiernów, within Goleniów County, West Pomeranian Voivodeship, in north-western Poland. It lies approximately 13 km (8 mi) east of Przybiernów, 26 km (16 mi) north of Goleniów, and 47 km (29 mi) north-east of the regional capital Szczecin.

The settlement has a population of 33.

== History ==
In the 960s the area became part of the emerging Duchy of Poland under Mieszko I. In 1225 Nicholas was noted as the owner of an estate in Buk, which became the first residence of the Flemish Flemming noble family in Pomerania and modern Poland (see also Flemish people in Poland). From the 18th century, the area was part of the Kingdom of Prussia, and from 1871 to 1945 it was part of Germany.
