= Łoźnica, West Pomeranian Voivodeship =

Łoźnica
- Village
- Location within Poland
- Coordinates: 53°41′N 14°52′E
- Country: Poland
- Voivodeship: West Pomeranian
- County: Goleniów
- Gmina: Przybiernów
- Population: 1,542

Łoźnica [wɔʑˈnit͡sa] (German: Cantreck) is a village in the administrative district of Gmina Przybiernów, within Goleniów County, West Pomeranian Voivodeship, in north-western Poland. It lies approximately 10 km (6 mi) south-east of Przybiernów, 16 km (10 mi) north of Goleniów, and 36 km (22 mi) north-east of the regional capital Szczecin.

In the 960s the area became part of Poland after Mieszko I defeated the local Slavic tribes. From 1871 to 1945 the area was part of Germany. For the history of the region, see History of Pomerania.

The village has a population of 1,542.
