= Żychlikowo =

- Village
- Location within Poland
- Coordinates: 53°42′N 14°54′E
- Country: Poland
- Voivodeship: West Pomeranian
- County: Goleniów
- Gmina: Przybiernów

Żychlikowo [ʐɨxliˈkɔvɔ] (German: Siegelkow) is a village in the administrative district of Gmina Przybiernów, within Goleniów County, West Pomeranian Voivodeship, in north-western Poland. It lies approximately 10 km (6 mi) south-east of Przybiernów, 18 km (11 mi) north of Goleniów, and 38 km (24 mi) north-east of the regional capital Szczecin.
