= Moracz =

- Village
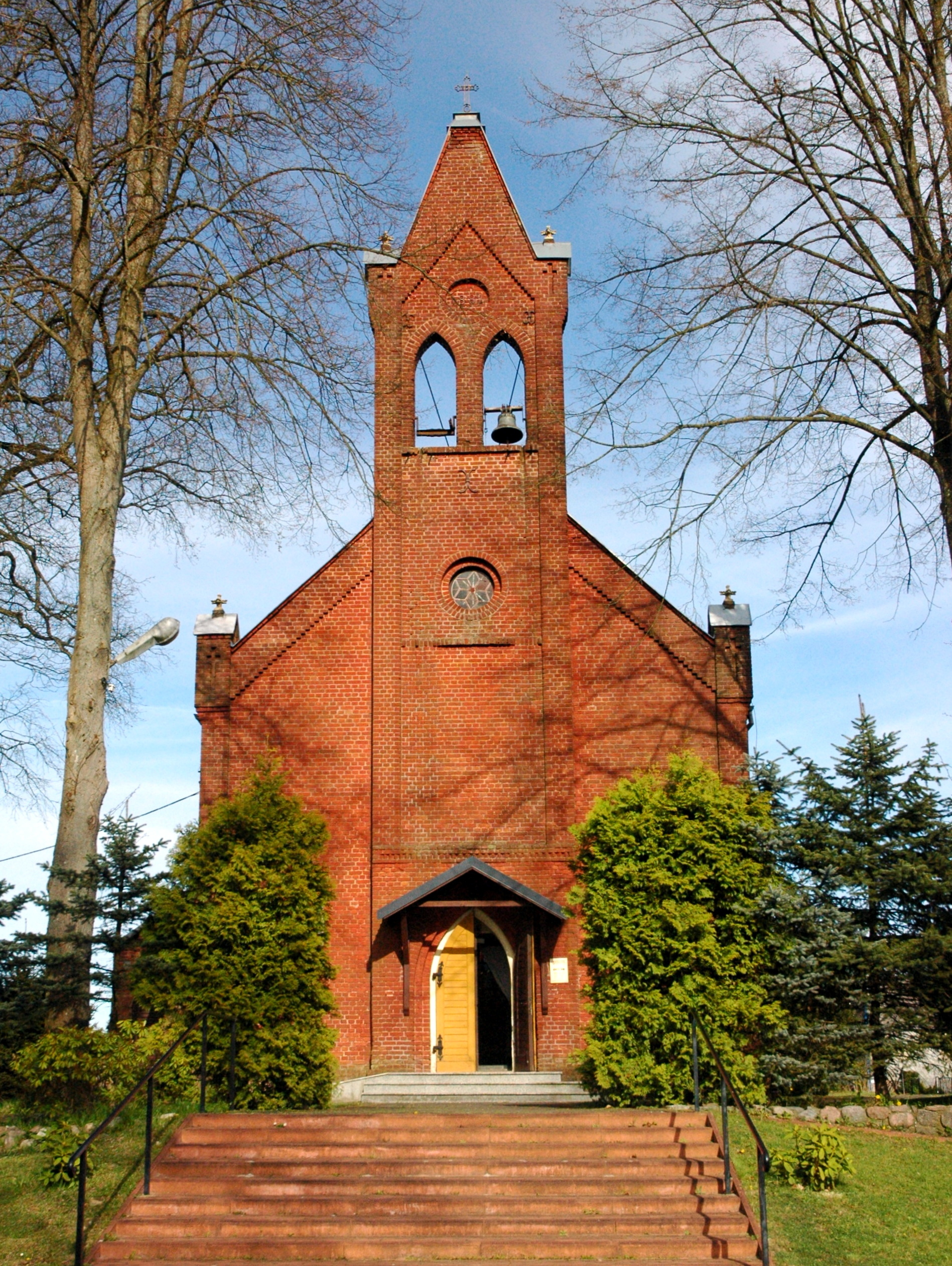
- Sacred Heart church in Moracz

- Location within Poland
- Coordinates: 53°46′24″N 14°52′24″E
- Country: Poland
- Voivodeship: West Pomeranian
- County: Goleniów
- Gmina: Przybiernów
- Time zone: UTC+1 (CET)
  - Summer (DST): UTC+2 (CEST)
- Vehicle registration: ZGL

Moracz [ˈmɔrat͡ʂ] (formerly German: Moratz) is a village in the administrative district of Gmina Przybiernów, within Goleniów County, West Pomeranian Voivodeship, in north-western Poland. It lies approximately 8 km (5 mi) east of Przybiernów, 26 km (16 mi) north of Goleniów, and 44 km (27 mi) north-east of the regional capital Szczecin.

== History ==
The territory became part of the emerging Polish state under its first ruler Mieszko I around 967. Later on, it became part of the Duchy of Pomerania under the House of Griffin until 1637. In the 18th century, the region was taken over by Prussia. During World War II, the German administration operated a forced labour subcamp of the Stalag II-D prisoner-of-war camp in the village.
