= Zabierzewo =

- Village
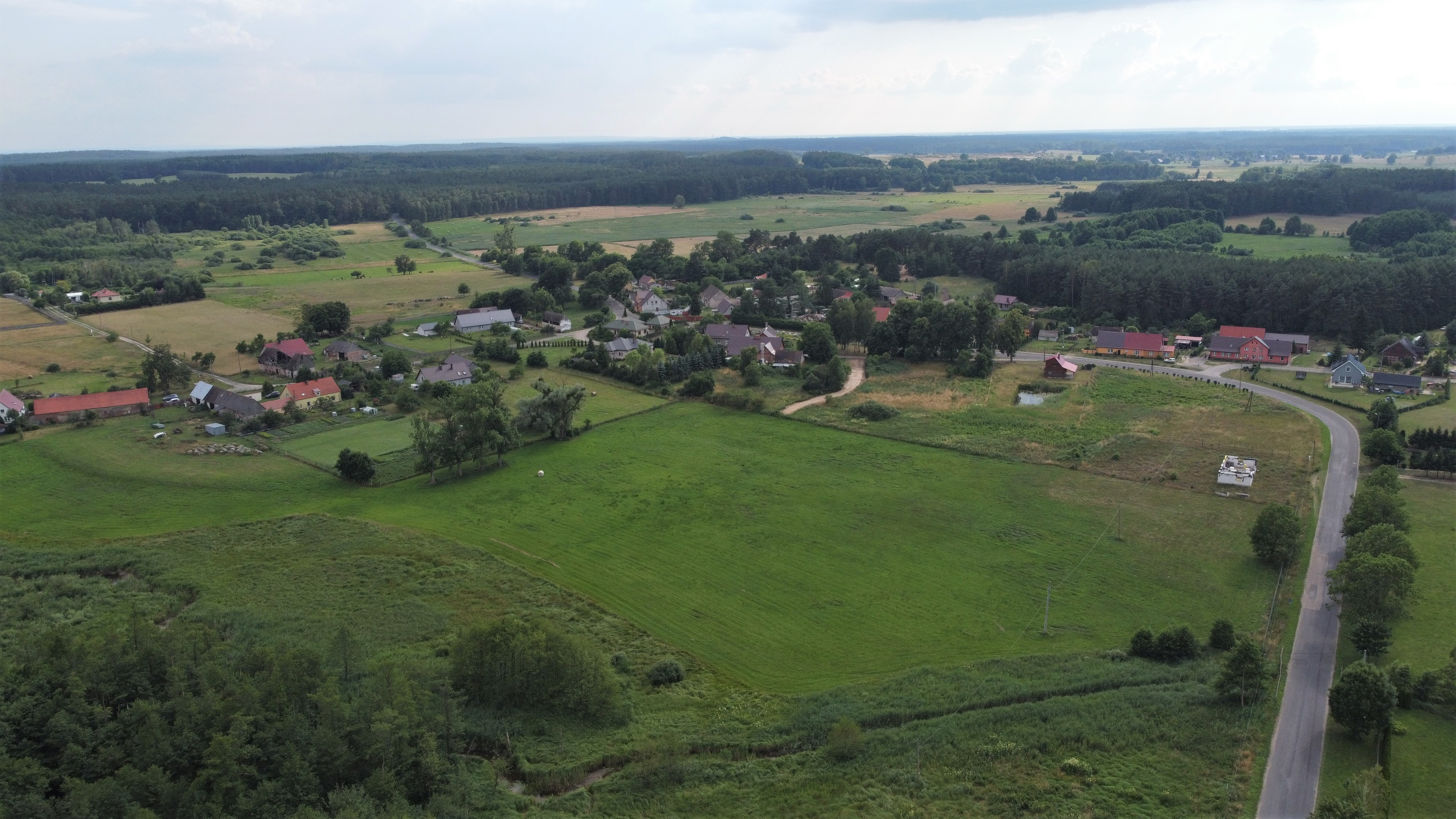

- Location within Poland
- Coordinates: 53°45′N 14°44′E
- Country: Poland
- Voivodeship: West Pomeranian
- County: Goleniów
- Gmina: Przybiernów
- Population: 150
- Time zone: UTC+1 (CET)
  - Summer (DST): UTC+2 (CEST)
- Vehicle registration: ZGL

Zabierzewo [zabjɛˈʐɛvɔ] (German: Sabessow) is a village in the administrative district of Gmina Przybiernów, within Goleniów County, West Pomeranian Voivodeship, in north-western Poland. It lies approximately 3 km (2 mi) west of Przybiernów, 23 km (14 mi) north of Goleniów, and 39 km (24 mi) north of the regional capital Szczecin.

The village has a population of 150.
