= Świętoszewko =

- Settlement
- Location within Poland
- Coordinates: 53°45′41″N 14°53′33″E
- Country: Poland
- Voivodeship: West Pomeranian
- County: Goleniów
- Gmina: Przybiernów
- Population: 140

Świętoszewko (Polish: [ɕfjɛntɔˈʂɛfkɔ]; formerly German: Schwanteshagener Mühle) is a settlement in the administrative district of Gmina Przybiernów, within Goleniów County, West Pomeranian Voivodeship, in north-western Poland. It lies approximately 9 km (6 mi) east of Przybiernów, 24 km (15 mi) north of Goleniów, and 44 km (27 mi) north-east of the regional capital Szczecin.

In the 960s the area became part of Poland after Mieszko I defeated the local Slavic tribes. From 1871 to 1945 the area was part of Germany. For the history of the region, see History of Pomerania.

The settlement has a population of 140.
