= Babigoszcz =

- Village
- Location within Poland
- Coordinates: 53°40′53″N 14°48′51″E
- Country: Poland
- Voivodeship: West Pomeranian
- County: Goleniów
- Gmina: Przybiernów
- Population: 255

Babigoszcz [baˈbiɡɔʂt͡ʂ] is a village in the administrative district of Gmina Przybiernów, within Goleniów County, West Pomeranian Voivodeship, in north-western Poland. It lies approximately 9 km (6 mi) south of Przybiernów, 15 km (9 mi) north of Goleniów, and 34 km (21 mi) north-east of the regional capital Szczecin.

The village has a population of 255.
