= Starzeńska =

Starzeńska may refer to the following places in Poland:

- Dąbrówka Starzeńska
- Grabownica Starzeńska
