= Dzisna, West Pomeranian Voivodeship =

Dzisna
- Village
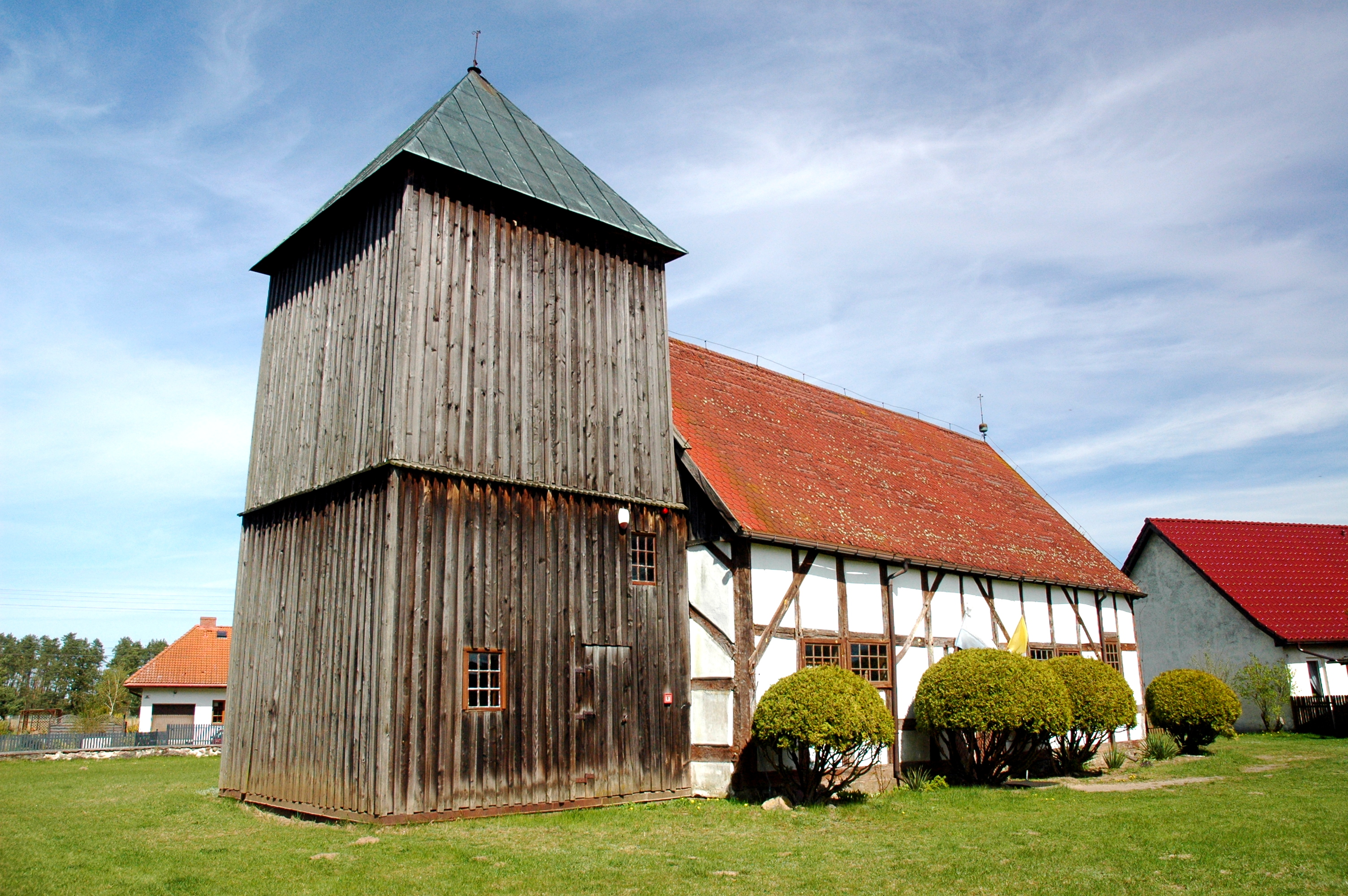
- Saint Stanislaus church in Dzisna

- Location within Poland
- Coordinates: 53°41′4″N 14°50′36″E
- Country: Poland
- Voivodeship: West Pomeranian
- County: Goleniów
- Gmina: Przybiernów

Population
  - Total: 100
- Time zone: UTC+1 (CET)
  - Summer (DST): UTC+2 (CEST)
- Vehicle registration: ZGL

Dzisna [ˈd͡ʑisna] is a village in the administrative district of Gmina Przybiernów, within Goleniów County, West Pomeranian Voivodeship, in north-western Poland. It lies approximately 9 km (6 mi) south-east of Przybiernów, 16 km (10 mi) north of Goleniów, and 35 km (22 mi) north-east of the regional capital Szczecin. It is situated on the Gowienica River.

The village has a population of 100.

In the 960s the area became part of Poland after Mieszko I defeated the local Slavic tribes. The area became German-speaking as the result of Ostsiedlung and became part of Germany. In 1945-46, all residents were expelled by the Polish Communist regime.
