= Czarnogłowy =

- Village
- Location within Poland
- Coordinates: 53°46′3″N 14°54′33″E
- Country: Poland
- Voivodeship: West Pomeranian
- County: Goleniów
- Gmina: Przybiernów

Czarnogłowy [t͡ʂarnɔˈɡwɔvɨ] is a village in the administrative district of Gmina Przybiernów, within Goleniów County, West Pomeranian Voivodeship, in north-western Poland. It lies approximately 10 km (6 mi) east of Przybiernów, 25 km (16 mi) north of Goleniów, and 45 km (28 mi) north-east of the regional capital Szczecin.

In the 960s the area became part of Poland after Mieszko I defeated the local Slavic tribes. From 1871 to 1945 the area was part of Germany. For the history of the region, see History of Pomerania.
