= Borovikov =

Borovikov (Russian: Боровиков), feminine: Borovikova is a Russian patronymic surname derived from the word боровик. Currently it means a kind of mushroom, but in the past it had other meanings derived from the word бор, 'pine forest' combined with the suffix -вик with the meaning "something associated with...".

The surname may refer to the following notable people:

- Dmitry Borovikov (1984–2006), Russian murderer
- Ekaterina Borovikova (born 1991), Russian freestyle swimmer
- Vladislav Borovikov (born), Ukrainian chess grandmaster

== See also ==
- Borovik (disambiguation)
