= Rzystnowo =

- Village
- Location within Poland
- Coordinates: 53°45′38″N 14°41′51″E
- Country: Poland
- Voivodeship: West Pomeranian
- County: Goleniów
- Gmina: Przybiernów

Rzystnowo [ʐɨstˈnɔvɔ] (formerly German: Rißnow) is a village in the administrative district of Gmina Przybiernów, within Goleniów County, West Pomeranian Voivodeship, in north-western Poland. It lies approximately 5 km (3 mi) west of Przybiernów, 25 km (16 mi) north of Goleniów, and 39 km (24 mi) north of the regional capital Szczecin.

In the 960s the area became part of Poland after Mieszko I defeated the local Slavic tribes. From 1871 to 1945 the area was part of Germany. For the history of the region, see History of Pomerania.
