= Włodzisław, Goleniów County =

Włodzisław
- Village
- Location within Poland
- Coordinates: 53°47′17″N 14°55′29″E
- Country: Poland
- Voivodeship: West Pomeranian
- County: Goleniów
- Gmina: Przybiernów

Włodzisław [vwɔˈd͡ʑiswaf] (formerly German: Baumgarten) is a village in the administrative district of Gmina Przybiernów, within Goleniów County, West Pomeranian Voivodeship, in north-western Poland. It lies approximately 12 km (7 mi) east of Przybiernów, 28 km (17 mi) north of Goleniów, and 47 km (29 mi) north-east of the regional capital Szczecin.

In the 960s, the area became part of Poland after Mieszko I defeated the local Slavic tribes. It later became part of the Holy Roman Empire and remained within German states in various forms. From 1871 to 1945 the village was part of unified Germany. After World War II, according to the Potsdam Agreement, it was returned to Poland. For more on the region's history, see History of Pomerania.
