= Kartlewo =

- Village
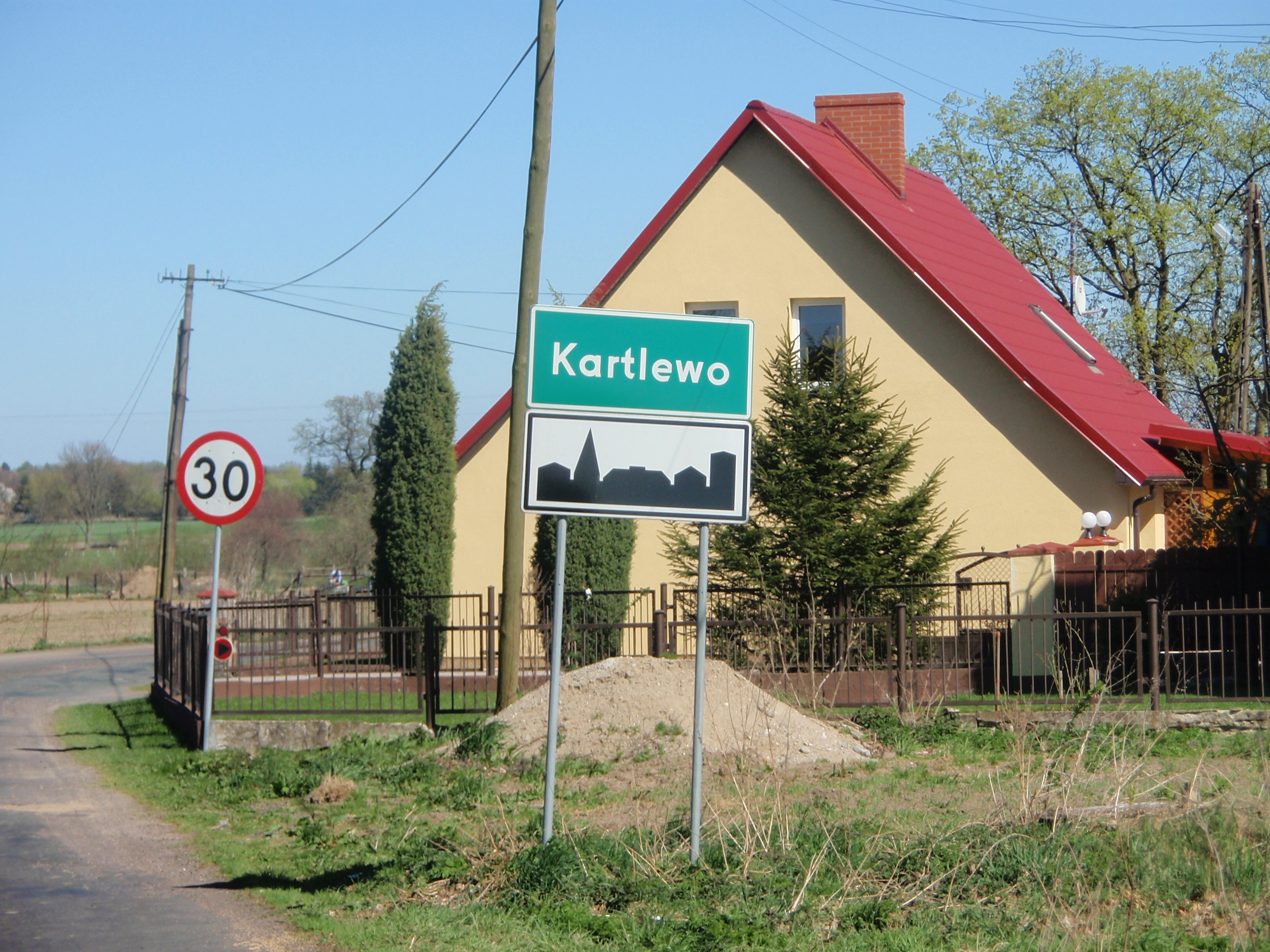
- Kartlewo welcome sign

- Location within Poland
- Coordinates: 53°47′28″N 14°47′30″E
- Country: Poland
- Voivodeship: West Pomeranian
- County: Goleniów
- Gmina: Przybiernów
- Population: 220

Kartlewo [karˈtlɛvɔ] (German: Kartlow) is a village in the administrative district of Gmina Przybiernów, within Goleniów County, West Pomeranian Voivodeship, in north-western Poland. It lies approximately 5 km (3 mi) north of Przybiernów, 27 km (17 mi) north of Goleniów, and 44 km (27 mi) north of the regional capital Szczecin.

In the 960s the area became part of Poland after Mieszko I defeated the local Slavic tribes. From 1871 to 1945 the area was part of Germany. For the history of the region, see History of Pomerania.

The village has a population of 220.
