= Gmina Dynów =

Gmina Dynów Dynów Commune
- Gmina
- Flag Coat of arms

- Location of Gmina Dynów within Rzeszów County
- Coordinates (Dynów): 49°50′N 22°14′E
- Country: Poland
- Voivodeship: Subcarpathian
- County: Rzeszów County
- Seat: Dynów

Area
  - Total: 119.02 km^{2} (45.95 sq mi)

Population (2021)
  - Total: 6,675
  - Density: 56.08/km^{2} (145.3/sq mi)
- Website: http://www.dynow.regiony.pl/

Gmina Dynów is a rural gmina (administrative district) in Rzeszów County, Subcarpathian Voivodeship, in south-eastern Poland. Its seat is the town of Dynów, although the town is not part of the territory of the gmina.

The gmina contains part of the protected area called Pogórze Przemyskie Landscape Park.

== Villages ==
Gmina Dynów contains the villages and settlements of Bachórz, Dąbrówka Starzeńska, Dylągowa, Harta, Laskówka, Łubno, Pawłokoma, Ulanica and Wyręby.

== Neighbouring gminas ==
Gmina Dynów is bordered by the town of Dynów and by the gminas of Bircza, Błażowa, Dubiecko, Hyżne, Jawornik Polski and Nozdrzec.
