= Sosnowice, Goleniów County =

Sosnowice
- Settlement
- Location within Poland
- Coordinates: 53°44′27″N 14°48′06″E
- Country: Poland
- Voivodeship: West Pomeranian
- County: Goleniów
- Gmina: Przybiernów

Sosnowice [sɔsnɔˈvit͡sɛ] (formerly German: Heinrichshof) is a settlement in the administrative district of Gmina Przybiernów, within Goleniów County, West Pomeranian Voivodeship, in north-western Poland.

In the 960s the area became part of Poland after Mieszko I defeated the local Slavic tribes. From 1871 to 1945 the area was part of Germany. For the history of the region, see History of Pomerania.
