= Sobieszewo, West Pomeranian Voivodeship =

Sobieszewo
- Village
- Location within Poland
- Coordinates: 53°40′31″N 14°51′34″E
- Country: Poland
- Voivodeship: West Pomeranian
- County: Goleniów
- Gmina: Przybiernów
- Postal code: 72-122

Sobieszewo [sɔbjɛˈʂɛvɔ] (formerly German: Matthishof) is a village in the administrative district of Gmina Przybiernów, within Goleniów County, West Pomeranian Voivodeship, in north-western Poland.

== History ==
The territory became part of the emerging Polish state under its first ruler Mieszko I around 967. Following the fragmentation of Poland, it was part of the Duchy of Pomerania. From the 18th century, it was part of the Kingdom of Prussia, and from 1871 to 1945 it formed part of Germany until 1945. After the defeat of Germany in World War II, under the terms of the Potsdam Agreement, the region, including Sobieszewo, was reintegrated into Poland.
