= Łubno, Podkarpackie Voivodeship =

Łubno
- Village
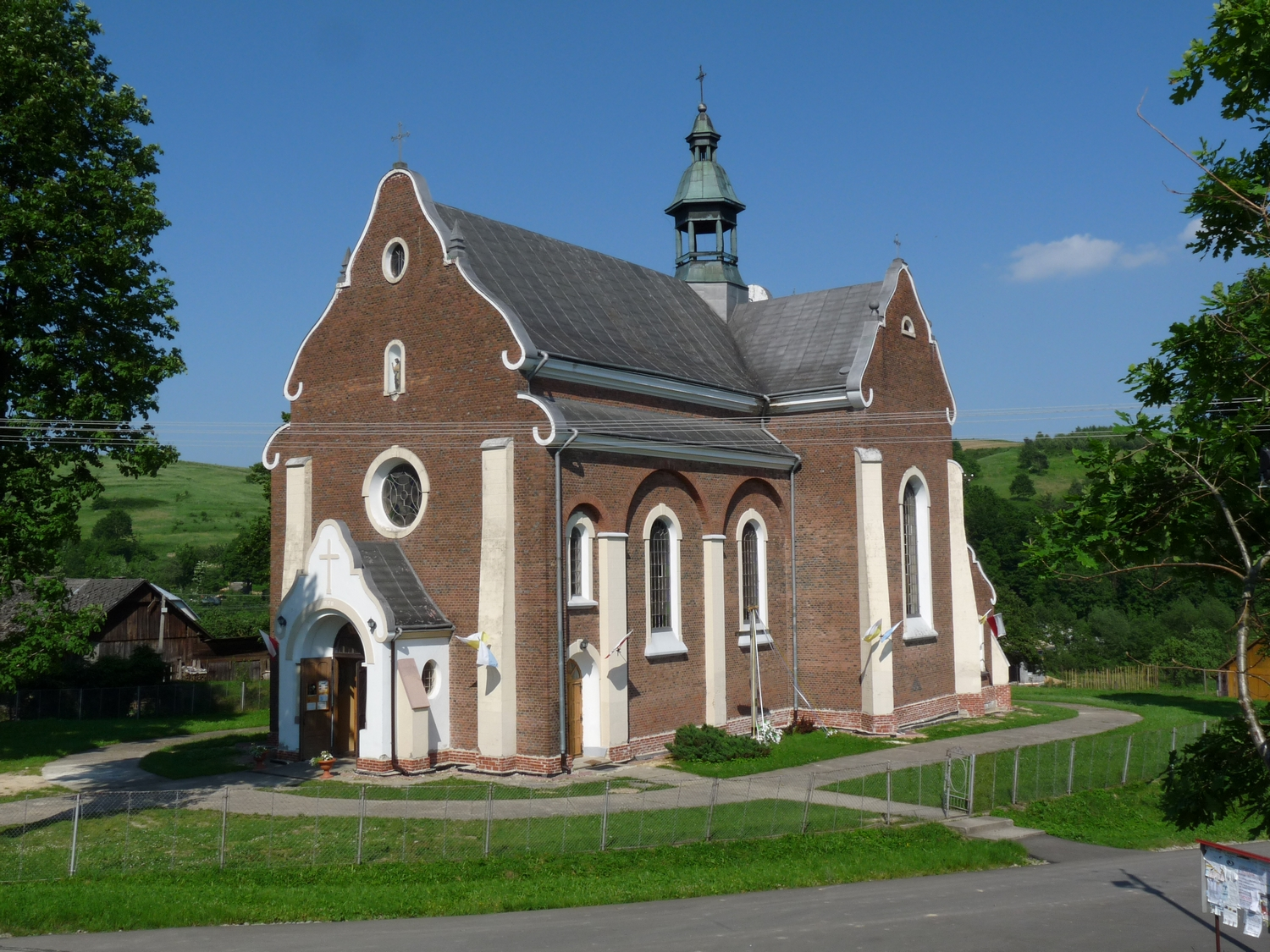
- Local Catholic church

- Location within Poland
- Coordinates: 49°49′N 22°10′E
- Country: Poland
- Voivodeship: Subcarpathian
- County: Rzeszów
- Gmina: Dynów

Population
  - Total: 1,300
- Time zone: UTC+1 (CET)
  - Summer (DST): UTC+2 (CEST)
- Vehicle registration: RZE
- Website: http://www.lubno.republika.pl/

Łubno [ˈwubnɔ] is a village in the administrative district of Gmina Dynów, within Rzeszów County, Subcarpathian Voivodeship, in south-eastern Poland.
