= Gmina Przybiernów =

Gmina Przybiernów Przybiernów Commune
- Gmina
- Coat of arms
- Interactive map of Gmina Przybiernów
- Coordinates (Przybiernów): 53°45′N 14°46′E
- Country: Poland
- Voivodeship: West Pomeranian
- County: Goleniów
- Seat: Przybiernów

Area
  - Total: 228.68 km^{2} (88.29 sq mi)

Population (2006)
  - Total: 5,194
  - Density: 22.71/km^{2} (58.83/sq mi)

Gmina Przybiernów is a rural gmina (administrative district) in Goleniów County, West Pomeranian Voivodeship, in north-western Poland. Its seat is the village of Przybiernów, which lies approximately 23 kilometres (14 mi) north of Goleniów and 39 km (24 mi) north of the regional capital Szczecin.

The gmina covers an area of 228.68 square kilometres (88.3 sq mi), and as of 2006 its total population is 5,194.

== Villages ==
Gmina Przybiernów contains the villages and settlements of Babigoszcz, Borowik, Brzozowo, Budzieszewice, Buk, Czarnogłowy, Derkacz, Domanie, Dzieszkowo, Dzisna, Kartlewko, Kartlewo, Leszczno, Łoźnica, Machowica, Miodowice, Moracz, Owczarnia, Przybiernów, Rokita, Rzystnowo, Sobieszewo, Sosnowice, Świętoszewko, Świętoszewo, Trzebianowo, Włodzisław, Zabierzewo and Żychlikowo.

== Neighbouring gminas ==
Gmina Przybiernów is bordered by the gminas of Golczewo, Goleniów, Nowogard, Osina, Stepnica and Wolin.
