= Wyręby, Podkarpackie Voivodeship =

Wyręby
- Village
- Location within Poland
- Coordinates: 49°49′57″N 22°7′43″E
- Country: Poland
- Voivodeship: Subcarpathian
- County: Rzeszów
- Gmina: Dynów
- Population: 229

Wyręby [vɨˈrɛmbɨ] is a village in the administrative district of Gmina Dynów, within Rzeszów County, Subcarpathian Voivodeship, in south-eastern Poland.
