= Pawłokoma massacre =

1945 WWII massacre of Ukrainians by Polish forces

- Part of Polish-Ukrainian ethnic conflict
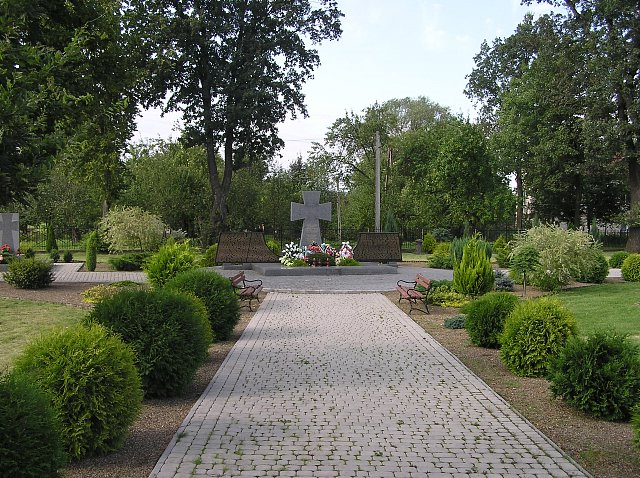
- Monument in memory of Ukrainians murdered in Pawłokoma on 3 March 1945
- Location: 49°48′54″N 22°17′18″E; Pawłokoma, Subcarpathian Voivodeship, Poland
- Date: 3 March 1945
- Target: Ukrainian civilians
- Attack type: Massacre
- Deaths: 150–500
- Perpetrator: Home Army under the command of Józef Biss
- Motive: Revenge for kidnappings carried out by NKVD, accidentally taken as Ukrainian Insurgent Army

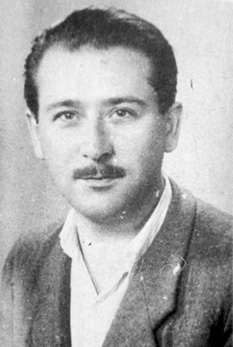
Lt. Józef Biss, commander of Polish troops who perpetrated the massacre

The Pawłokoma massacre was a massacre on 3 March 1945 of Ukrainians by Polish forces in the village of Pawłokoma 40 km (25 mi) west of Przemyśl. The Polish post Home Army (AK) unit was commanded by Lt. Józef Biss and aided by Polish men from surrounding villages; the atrocities committed were an act of reprisal to similar, though en masse, attacks carried out on Polish villagers by the Ukrainian Insurgent Army. Between 150 and 500 people were executed.

== Background ==
The background to the event was a four-way struggle between Ukrainian, Polish, German, and Soviet forces in the then predominantly Ukrainian region of Volhynia. Mass executions and violence led to the death of 30,000 Ukrainians and between 70,000 and 100,000 Poles between February 1943 and July 1944.

== Massacre ==
The Polish troops commanded by Lt. Józef Biss herded the Ukrainian villagers to the local church where they were shot. Following the mass shooting, the Poles dumped the bodies in pits at the village cemetery. According to Polish historian Zdzisław Konieczny, the unit killed 150 men. Other estimates of those killed range from 366 to 500.

== Aftermath ==
In 1947, the Soviet-installed Polish communist government launched Operation Vistula, which deported Ukrainian residents of the area en masse. Propaganda in schools depicted Ukrainians as traitors, fascists, and "natural enemies" of Poles.

== Commemoration ==
During Ukrainian Prime Minister Viktor Yushchenko's visit to Poland in May 2006, a monument in memory for 366 victims was dedicated in the village.

== See also ==
- Massacres of Poles in Volhynia and Eastern Galicia
- Sahryń massacre
