= Ulanica =

- Village
- Location within Poland
- Coordinates: 49°51′N 22°11′E
- Country: Poland
- Voivodeship: Subcarpathian
- County: Rzeszów
- Gmina: Dynów

Ulanica [ulaˈɲit͡sa] is a village in the administrative district of Gmina Dynów, within Rzeszów County, Subcarpathian Voivodeship, in south-eastern Poland.
