= Anastazja Pustelnik =

Polish Roman Catholic nun and cookbook author (1950–2026)

Sister Anastazja Pustelnik FDC
- Sister Anastazja in 2013
- Born: Krystyna Pustelnik; 13 October 1950; Dylągowa, Poland
- Died: 4 October 2026 (aged 75)
- Other name: Siostra ("Sister") Anastazja
- Occupations: Nun, cookbook author
- Years active: 1957–2018
- Organization(s): Daughters of Divine Charity (Roman Catholic order)
- Known for: Cooking, publishing
- Notable work: 103 ciasta Siostry Anastazji (Sister Anastazja's 103 cakes)
- Awards: Feniks
- Website: siostra-anastazja.pl

Anastazja Pustelnik FDC (born Krystyna Pustelnik; 13 October 1950 – 4 October 2026) was a Polish nun who belonged to the Daughters of Divine Charity, and a cookbook author under the name "Siostra ('Sister') Anastazja".

== Life and work ==
Pustelnik's father died when she was six months old. She began cooking at the age of 17, after her mother's death. For two years, she worked at a glassworks in Vsetín, Czechoslovakia. In 1973, she joined a religious order. There, she cooked for disabled children and later for the Jesuit community in Kraków. Pustelnik wrote 17 cookbooks, the first of which was Sister Anastasia’s 103 Cakes. By 2017, the total number of copies of her books sold had reached 4 million. Pustelnik's books are sold at locations such as post offices. According to Newsweek, the popularity of books such as those by Pustelnik testifies to the progressive emancipation of Polish female religious orders, which began in the 1990s.

In 2018, she retired and took up residence in a convent in Wola Justowska. In 2019, she received a Special Feniks Award.

In 2019, the publisher Wydawnictwo WAM published a biography of Pustelnik by Sławomir Rusin, titled Siostra Anastazja: Życie pełne smaku (Sister Anastazja: A Life Full of Flavour).

Pustelnik died on 4 October 2026, at the age of 75, after a battle with cancer.
