= Borović =

Borović is a South Slavic surname. Notable people with the surname include:

- Darinka Mirković Borović (1896–1979), Montenegrin nurse during World War I
- Goran Borović, Croatian martial artist
- Iva Borović (born 1988), Croatian basketball player
- Nenad Borović (born 1964), Serbian politician
- Paola Borović (born 1995), Croatian long and triple jumper

== See also ==
- Borovik (disambiguation)
