= Owczarnia, West Pomeranian Voivodeship =

Owczarnia
- Village
- Location within Poland
- Coordinates: 53°44′38″N 14°45′40″E
- Country: Poland
- Voivodeship: West Pomeranian
- County: Goleniów
- Gmina: Przybiernów

Owczarnia [ɔfˈt͡ʂarɲa] (German: Schäferei) is a village in the administrative district of Gmina Przybiernów, within Goleniów County, West Pomeranian Voivodeship, in north-western Poland.

In the 960s the area became part of Poland after Mieszko I defeated the local Slavic tribes. From 1871 to 1945 the area was part of Germany. For the history of the region, see History of Pomerania.
