= Borowik, West Pomeranian Voivodeship =

Borowik
- Village
- Location within Poland
- Coordinates: 53°41′39″N 14°45′30″E
- Country: Poland
- Voivodeship: West Pomeranian
- County: Goleniów
- Gmina: Przybiernów

Borowik [bɔˈrɔvik] (German: Forsthaus Pribbernow) is a village in the administrative district of Gmina Przybiernów, within Goleniów County, West Pomeranian Voivodeship, in north-western Poland. It lies approximately 7 km (4 mi) south of Przybiernów, 17 km (11 mi) north of Goleniów, and 33 km (21 mi) north of the regional capital Szczecin.
