= Laskówka, Podkarpackie Voivodeship =

Laskówka
- Village
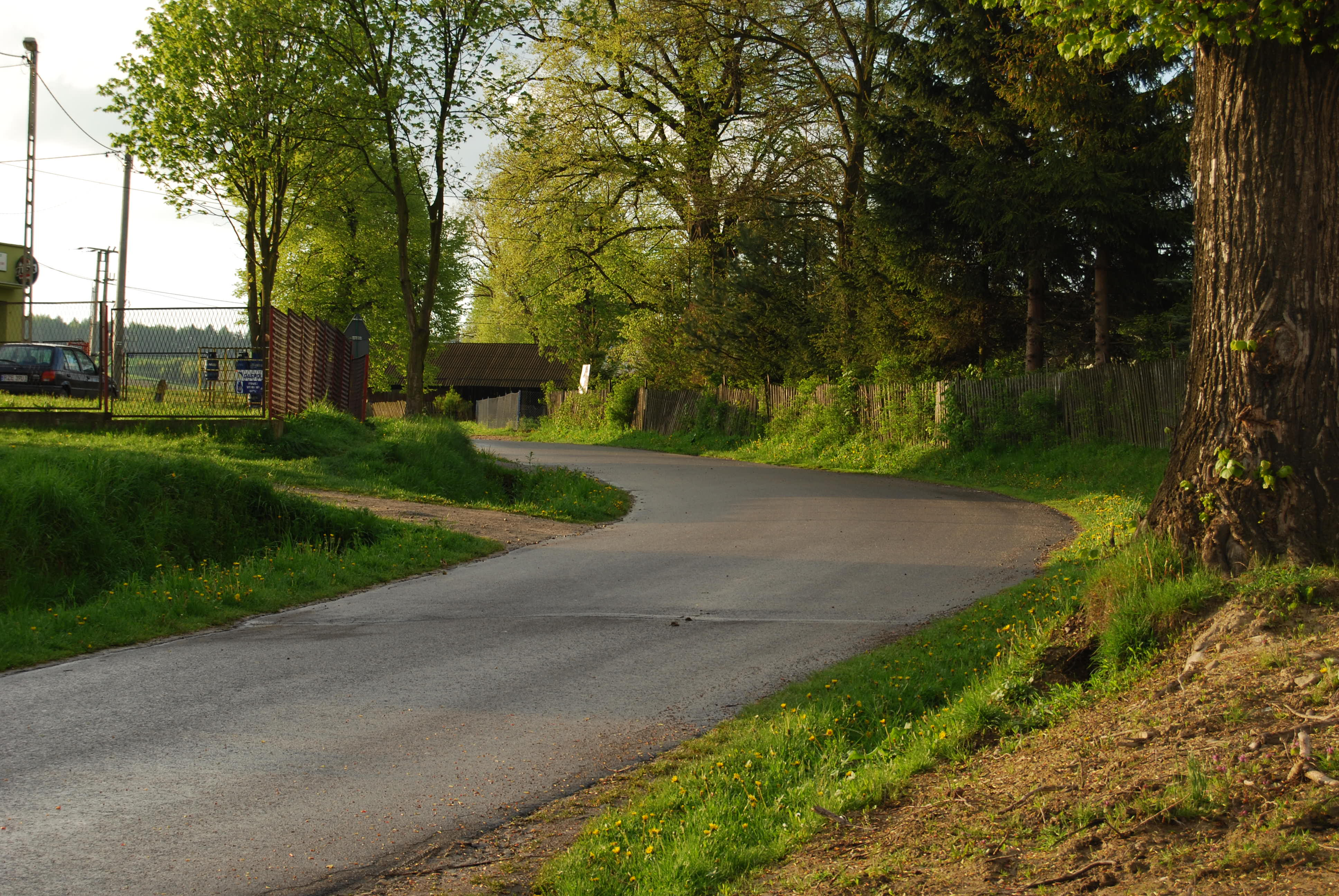

- Location within Poland
- Coordinates: 49°51′19″N 22°17′21″E
- Country: Poland
- Voivodeship: Subcarpathian
- County: Rzeszów
- Gmina: Dynów

Population
  - Total: 484
- Time zone: UTC+1 (CET)
  - Summer (DST): UTC+2 (CEST)
- Vehicle registration: RZE

Laskówka [lasˈkufka] is a village in the administrative district of Gmina Dynów, within Rzeszów County, Subcarpathian Voivodeship, in south-eastern Poland.

Five Polish citizens were murdered by Nazi Germany in the village during World War II.
