= Borovik (rural locality) =

Rural locality in Pskovsky District, Pskov Oblast, Russia

Borovik Боровик
- Village
- Location within Pskov Oblast Location within Russia
- Coordinates: 58.227°N 27.991°E
- Country: Russia
- Region: Pskov Oblast
- District: Pskovsky District

Population (2021)
  - Total: 31
- Time zone: UTC+3:00

Borovik (Russian: Борови́к) is a village in Pskovsky District of Pskov Oblast, Russia. It is located by the river Lochkina, a tributary of the Chyornaya, which in turn flows into Lake Peipus. At the time of the 2021 census, it had a population of 31.

In 1862, Borovik was a village with 17 homesteads and 120 inhabitants. The villagers belonged to the Orthodox parish of Maslogostitsy, but the village also had its own church, a wooden church dedicated to the Intercession of the Theotokos, since 1897. The church is still standing today and has retained its original appearance.

In the early Soviet era, Borovik was part of the volost of Seryodka and, since 1924, the center of a selsoviet within it. After uezds and volosts were abolished in 1927, the Borovik selsoviet became part of the Seryodkinsky District. The selsoviet comprised seven villages with a total population of 585 in 1933. After the Seryodkinsky District was abolished in 1958, the Borovik selsoviet was transferred to the Pskovsky District. It was merged into the Seryodka selsoviet in the following year.
