= Dylągowa =

Village in Rzeszów County, Subcarpathian Voivodeship, Poland

- Village
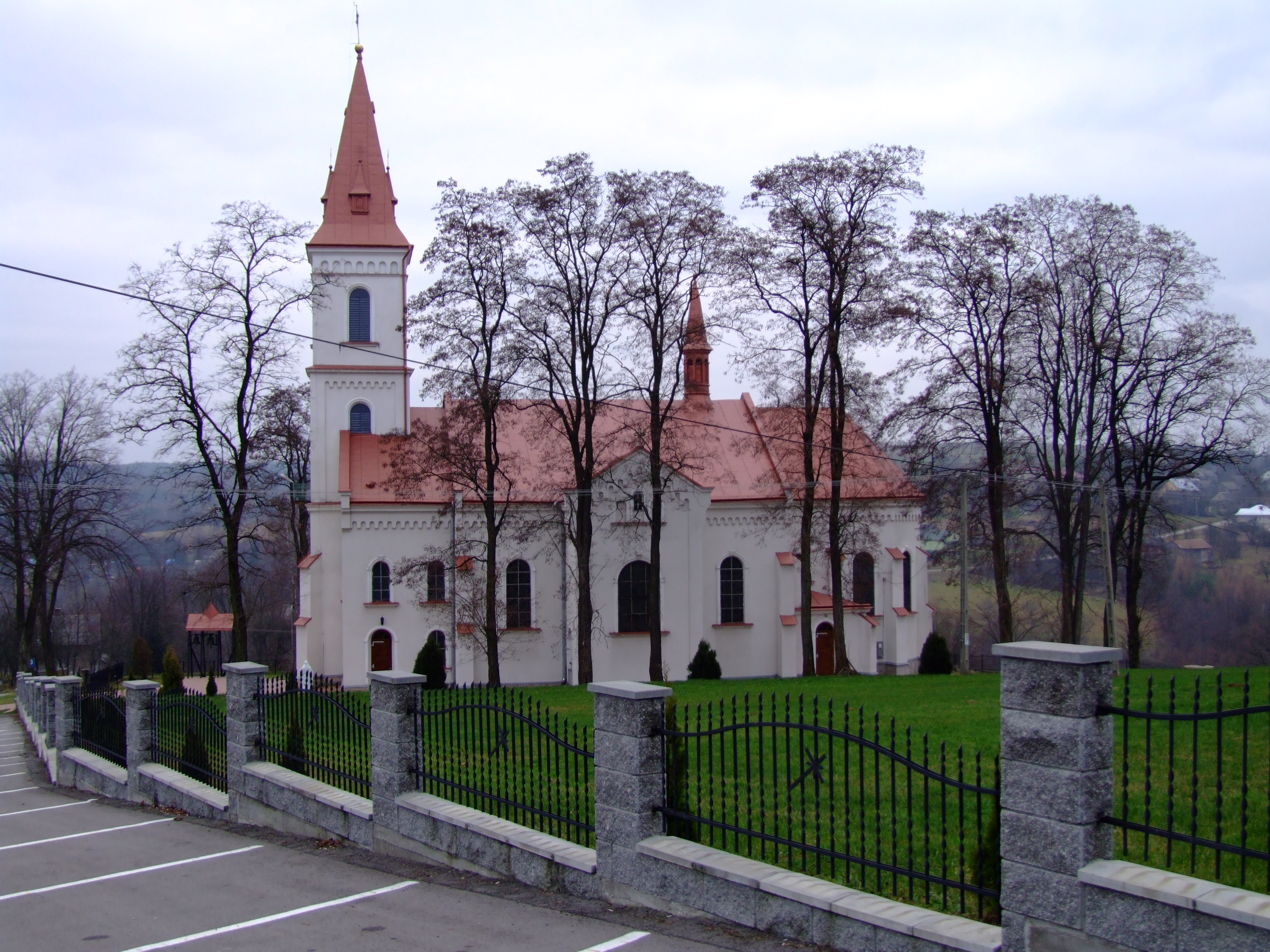
- Saint Sophia church

- Location within Poland
- Coordinates: 49°46′45″N 22°17′48″E
- Country: Poland
- Voivodeship: Subcarpathian
- County: Rzeszów
- Gmina: Dynów

Population
  - Total: 670
- Time zone: UTC+1 (CET)
  - Summer (DST): UTC+2 (CEST)
- Vehicle registration: RZE

Dylągowa ([dɨlɔŋˈɡɔva]) is a village in the administrative district of Gmina Dynów, within Rzeszów County, Subcarpathian Voivodeship, in south-eastern Poland.

Five Polish citizens were murdered by Nazi Germany in the village during World War II.

Dylągowa is also the birthplace of Anastazja Pustelnik (1950–2026), a nun who became well known as a cook and a writer of cookbooks.
