= Pawłokoma =

- Village
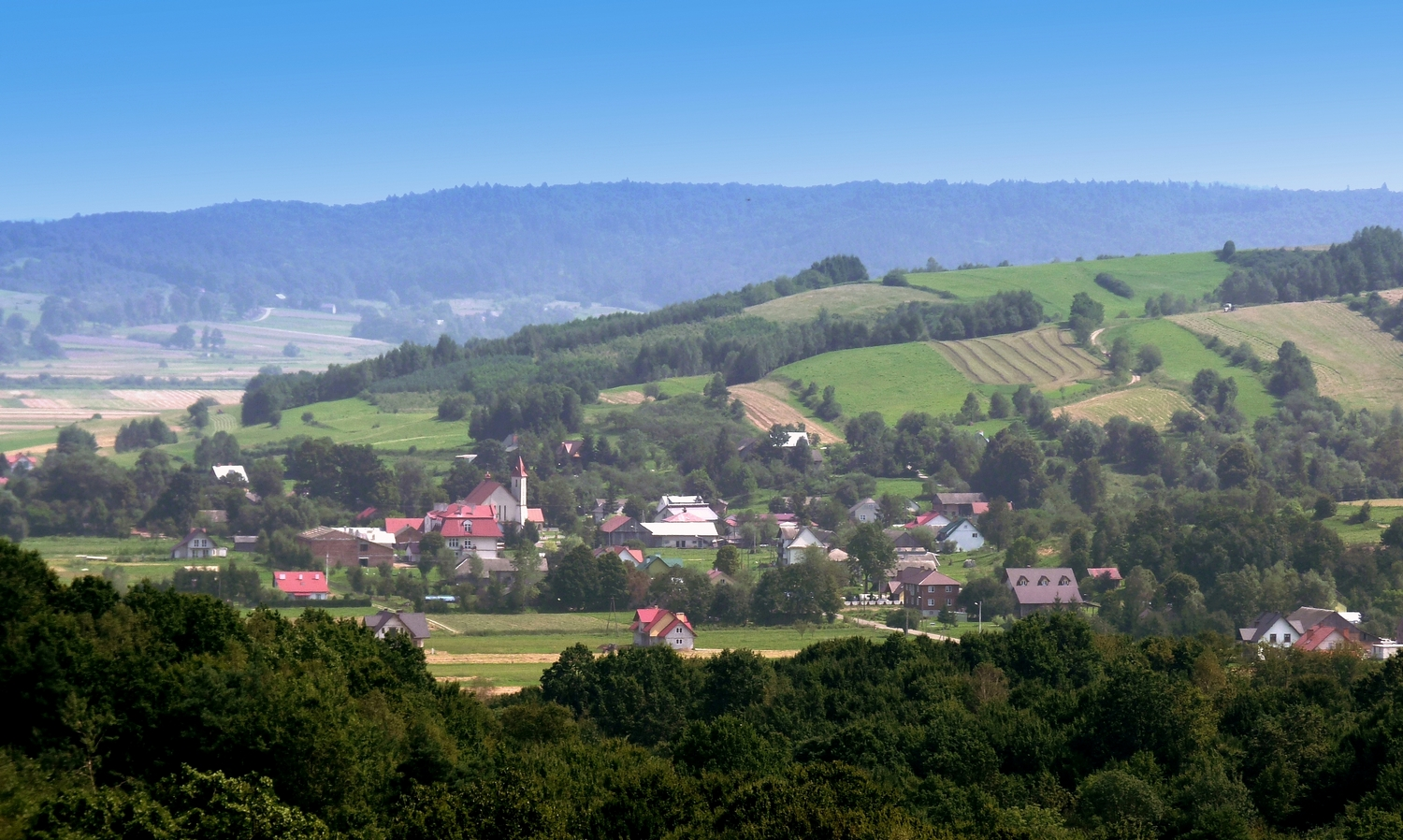
- Pawłokoma

- Location within Poland
- Coordinates: 49°48′50″N 22°17′15″E
- Country: Poland
- Voivodeship: Subcarpathian
- County: Rzeszów
- Gmina: Dynów
- Population: 518

Pawłokoma [pavwɔˈkɔma] is a village in the administrative district of Gmina Dynów, within Rzeszów County, Subcarpathian Voivodeship, in south-eastern Poland.

== History ==
In the late stages of the Volyn massacres, in March 1945, 365 Ukrainian, and a few Polish, inhabitants of the village were murdered by a former Armia Krajowa unit, commanded by Józef Biss "Wacław". A monument to commemorate the Ukrainian victims of the Pawłokoma massacre was erected in 2005.
