= Józef Bachórz =

Polish philologist (1934–2024)

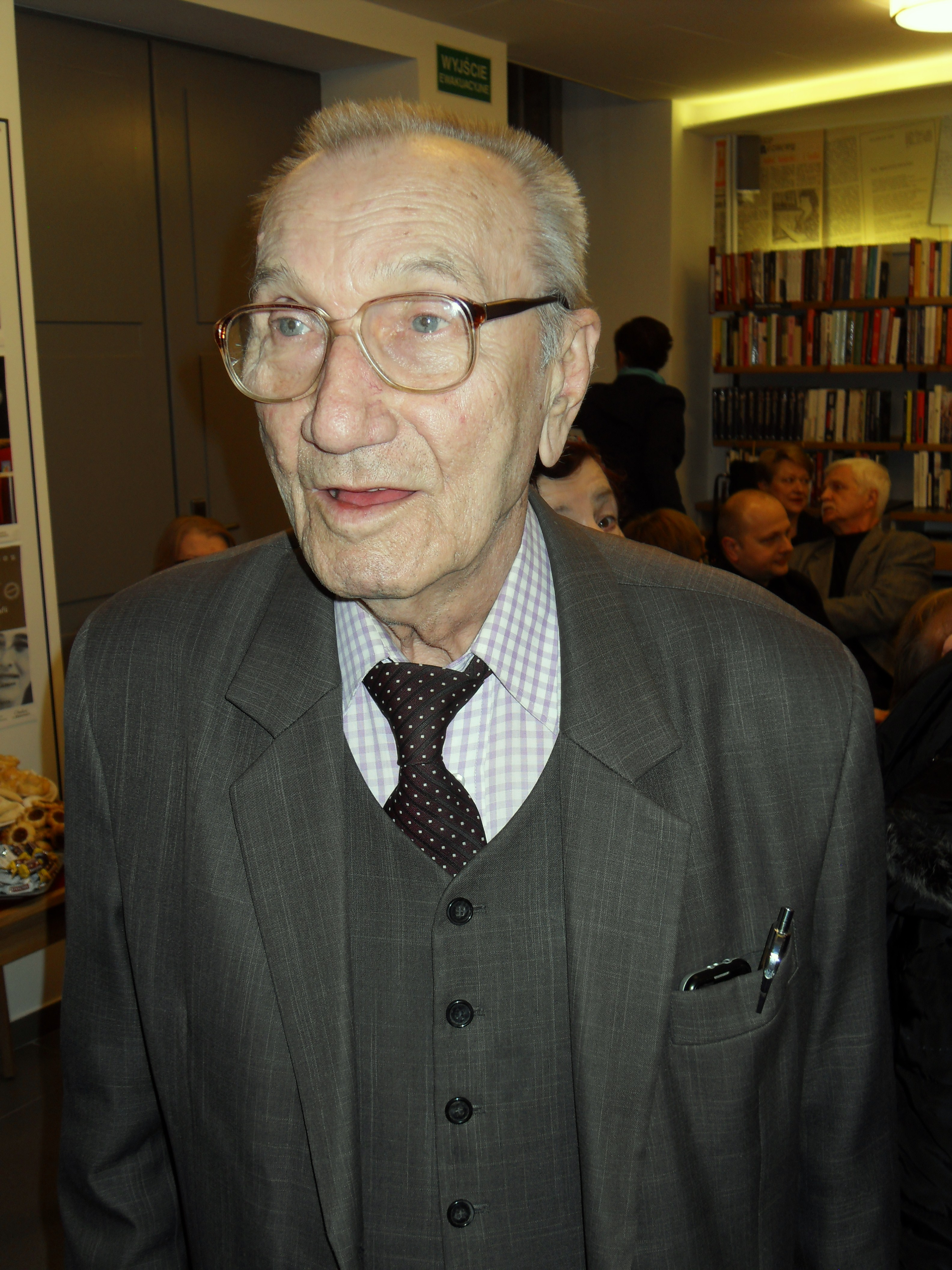
- Bachórz in 2015
- Born: 20 September 1934; Lipie, Poland
- Died: 20 September 2024 (aged 90)
- Occupation: Professor

Józef Bachórz (20 September 1934 – 20 September 2024) was a Polish philologist, professor of Gdańsk University, and an expert in Polish poetry. He was the recipient of the 2003 Johannes Hevelius Award in the humanities category, Order of Polonia Restituta in 2004, as well as a number of other awards. Born on 20 September 1934, Bachórz died on 20 September 2024, his 90th birthday.
