= Wojciech Borowik =

Polish politician (1956–2020)

Wojciech Jan Borowik (24 June 1956 – 22 December 2020) was a Polish politician.

== Biography ==
Born in Warsaw, he served as a member of the Sejm from 1993 to 1997, with the Labour Union Party, of which he was one of the founders. In the early 1990s, Borowik served as parliament secretary for the Labour Solidarity Party.

In 2015, he was awarded the Cross of Freedom and Solidarity.

Borowik died from COVID-19 on 22 December 2020, at age 64, during the COVID-19 pandemic in Poland.
