= Bachórz, Podkarpackie Voivodeship =

Bachórz
- Village
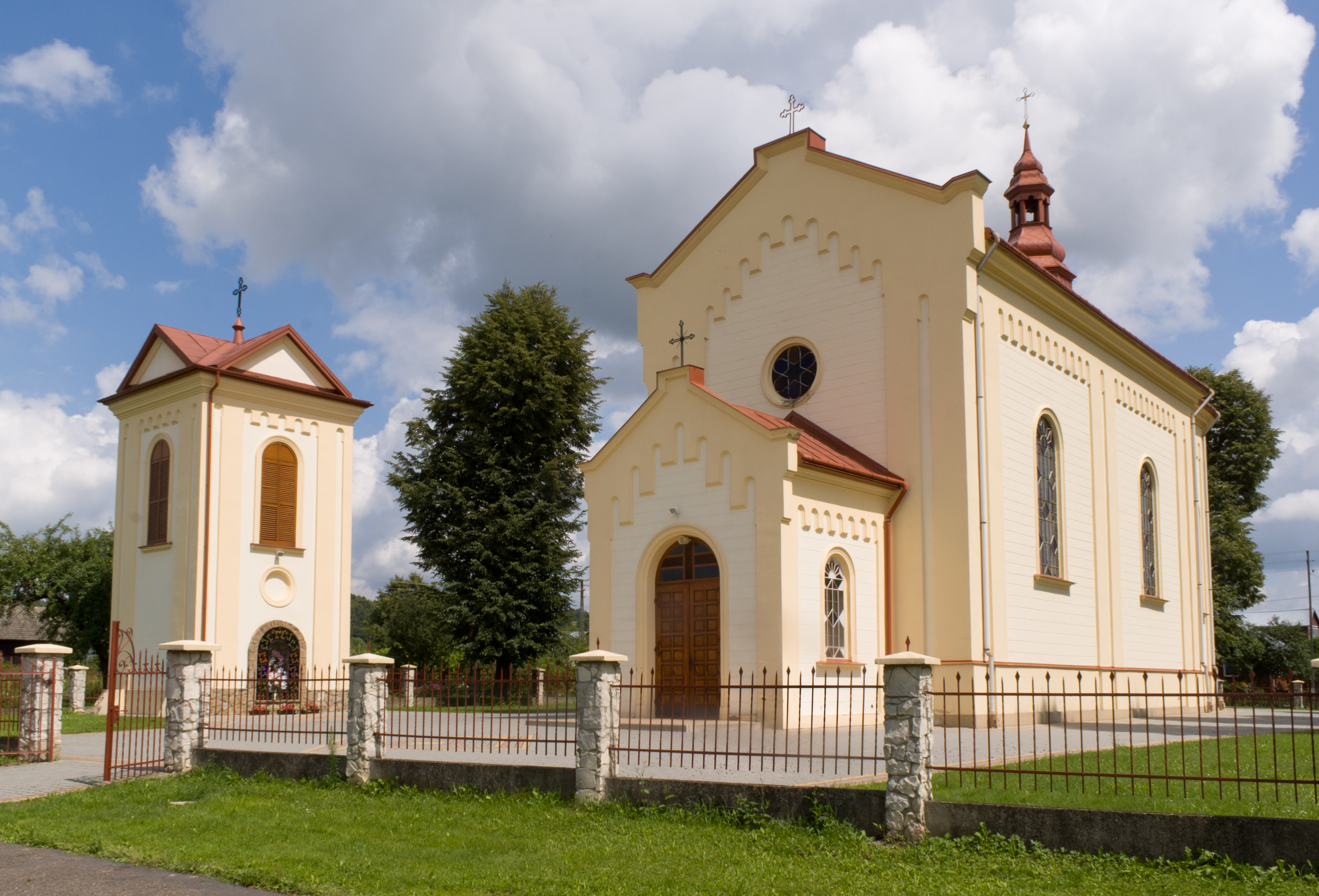
- Saint Adalbert of Prague church

- Location within Poland
- Coordinates: 49°50′N 22°17′E
- Country: Poland
- Voivodeship: Subcarpathian
- County: Rzeszów
- Gmina: Dynów

Population
  - Total: 1,214
- Time zone: UTC+1 (CET)
  - Summer (DST): UTC+2 (CEST)
- Vehicle registration: RZE

Bachórz ([ˈbaxuʂ]) is a village in the administrative district of Gmina Dynów, within Rzeszów County, Subcarpathian Voivodeship, in south-eastern Poland. In the 2021 census, the population was 1,077.
