= Borovik =

Borovik or Borovyk may refer to:

== People ==
- Alexandre Borovik (born 1956), UK professor of mathematics
- Artyom Borovik (1960–2000), Russian journalist
- Dimitri Borovik (born 1974), Estonian biathlete
- Genrikh Borovik (born 1929), Russian journalist
- Oleh Borovyk (born 1996) is a Ukrainian sprint canoer
- Sasha Borovik (born 1968), American and European lawyer
- Sevğil Musayeva-Borovyk, Ukrainian journalist from Crimea, Ukraine
- Yevhen Borovyk (born 1985), Ukrainian footballer

== Places ==
- Borovik (rural locality), a place in Russia
- Borovik, Osijek-Baranja County, a village near Drenje, Croatia
- Borovik, Split-Dalmatia County, a village near Komiža, Croatia
- Borovik Lake, an artificial lake at the Vuka river, Croatia

== See also ==
- Borovic
- Borowik (disambiguation)
