= Irena Borowik =

Polish publisher

Irena Borowik (born 1956) is a Polish publisher and professor of religious studies at the Jagiellonian University in Kraków. She is the chair and co-founder of the International Study of Religion in Eastern and Central Europe Association (ISORECEA) and has been a board member of the Research Committee on Sociology of Religion of the International Sociological Association. She sits on the editorial boards of the Journal of Contemporary Religion and of Social Compass.

As an editor and publisher, Borowik has brought the Central and Eastern European sociology of religion to the attention of the wider world through her publishing house NOMOS, which has published papers presented at ISORECEA conferences and related works. Inside Poland, she has been responsible for translations of key international writers in religious studies into Polish, especially Eileen Barker, Peter L. Berger, and Thomas Luckmann.

Borowik has also published volumes of poetry in Polish and Belarusian.

== Selected English-language bibliography ==
- Borowik Irena, Jablonski P. (eds.), The Future of Religion. East and West, Zaklad Wydawniczy "Nomos", Kraków, 1995
- Borowik, Irena. "Religion and Sexual Values in Poland", in The Journal of Contemporary Religion 1/1996
- Borowik Irena, G. Babinski (eds.), New Religious Phenomena in Central and Eastern Europe, Zaklad Wydawniczy "Nomos", Kraków, 1997
- Borowik Irena, (ed.) Church-State Relations in Central and Eastern Europe after the Collapse of Communism, Zaklad Wydawniczy "Nomos", Kraków, 1999
- Borowik, Irena & Tomka, Miklós (eds.) Religion and social change in post-communist Europe, 2001
- Borowik, Irena "The Roman Catholic Church in the Process of Democratic Transformation: the Case of Poland" Social Compass, vol. 49, 2002
- Borowik, Irena (ed.) Religions, Churches and the Scientific Studies of Religion – Poland and Ukraine, 2003
- Borowik, Irena, Dinka Marinović Jerolimov, Siniša Zrinščak (eds.) Religion and patterns of social transformation, Institut za Društvena Istraživanja u Zagrebu, Zagreb, 2004
- Borowik, Irena "Orthodoxy Confronting the Collapse of Communism in Post-Soviet Countries" Social Compass, vol. 53, 2006
