= Harta, Poland =

Harta
- Village
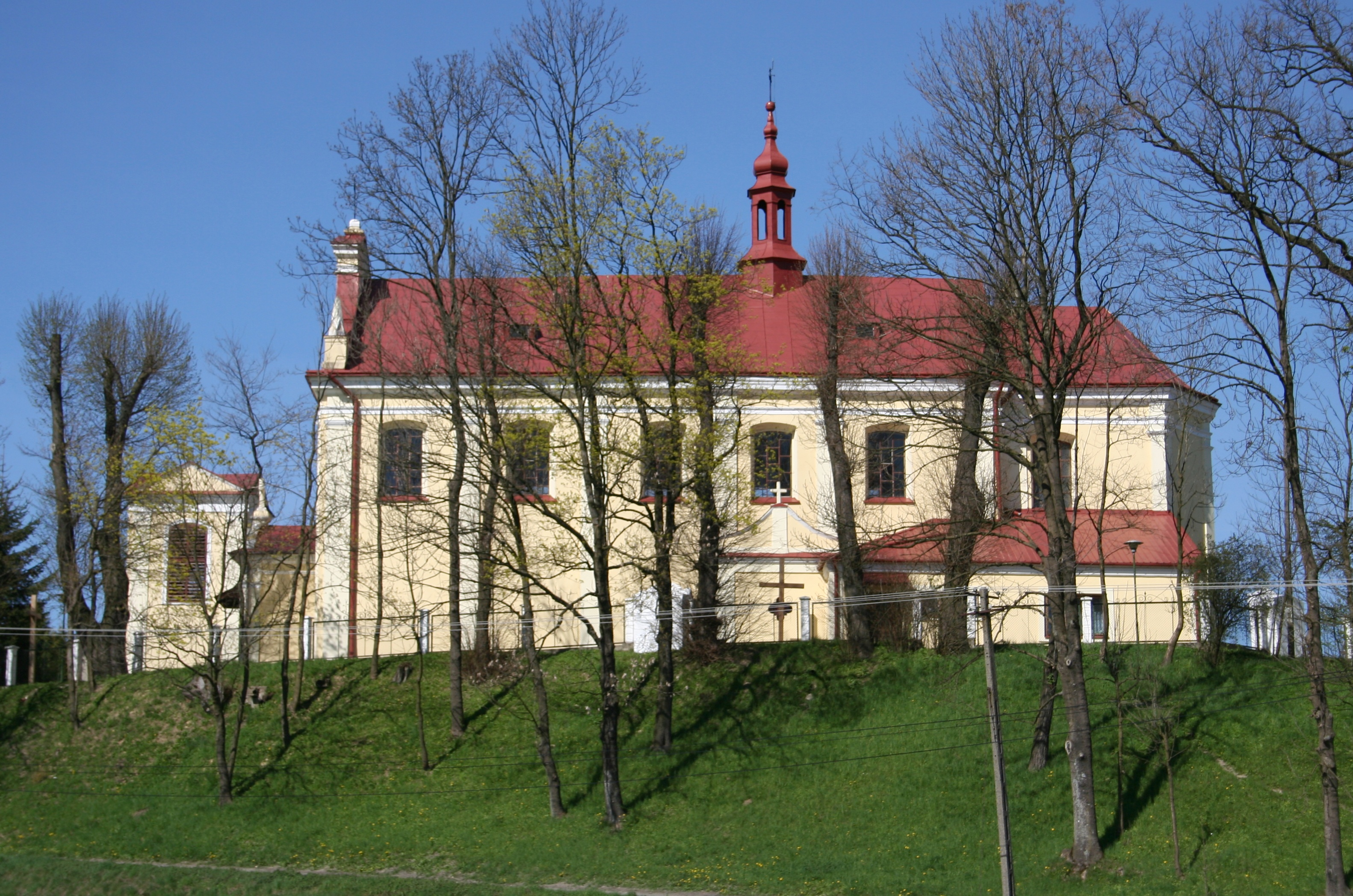
- Saint Nicholas church

- Location within Poland
- Coordinates: 49°52′N 22°12′E
- Country: Poland
- Voivodeship: Subcarpathian
- County: Rzeszów
- Gmina: Dynów

Population
  - Total: 2,179
- Time zone: UTC+1 (CET)
  - Summer (DST): UTC+2 (CEST)
- Vehicle registration: RZE

Harta ([ˈxarta]) is a village in the administrative district of Gmina Dynów, within Rzeszów County, Subcarpathian Voivodeship, in south-eastern Poland.
