= Dąbrówka Starzeńska =

- Village
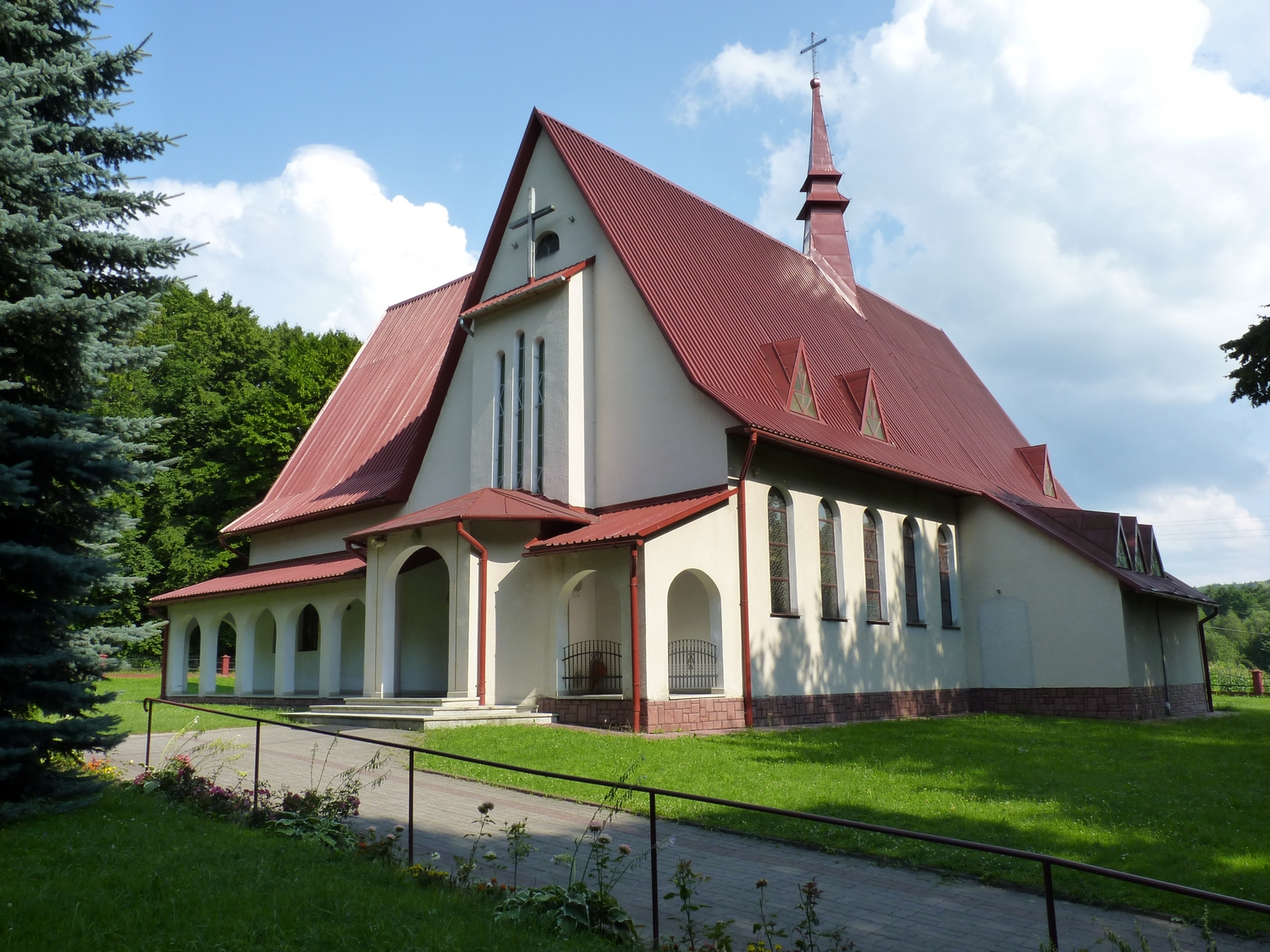
- Our Lady of Częstochowa church

- Location within Poland
- Coordinates: 49°47′N 22°15′E
- Country: Poland
- Voivodeship: Subcarpathian
- County: Rzeszów
- Gmina: Dynów
- Time zone: UTC+1 (CET)
  - Summer (DST): UTC+2 (CEST)
- Vehicle registration: RZE

Dąbrówka Starzeńska ([dɔmˈbrufka staˈʐɛɲska]) is a village in the administrative district of Gmina Dynów, within Rzeszów County, Subcarpathian Voivodeship, in south-eastern Poland.
