= Przybiernów =

- Village
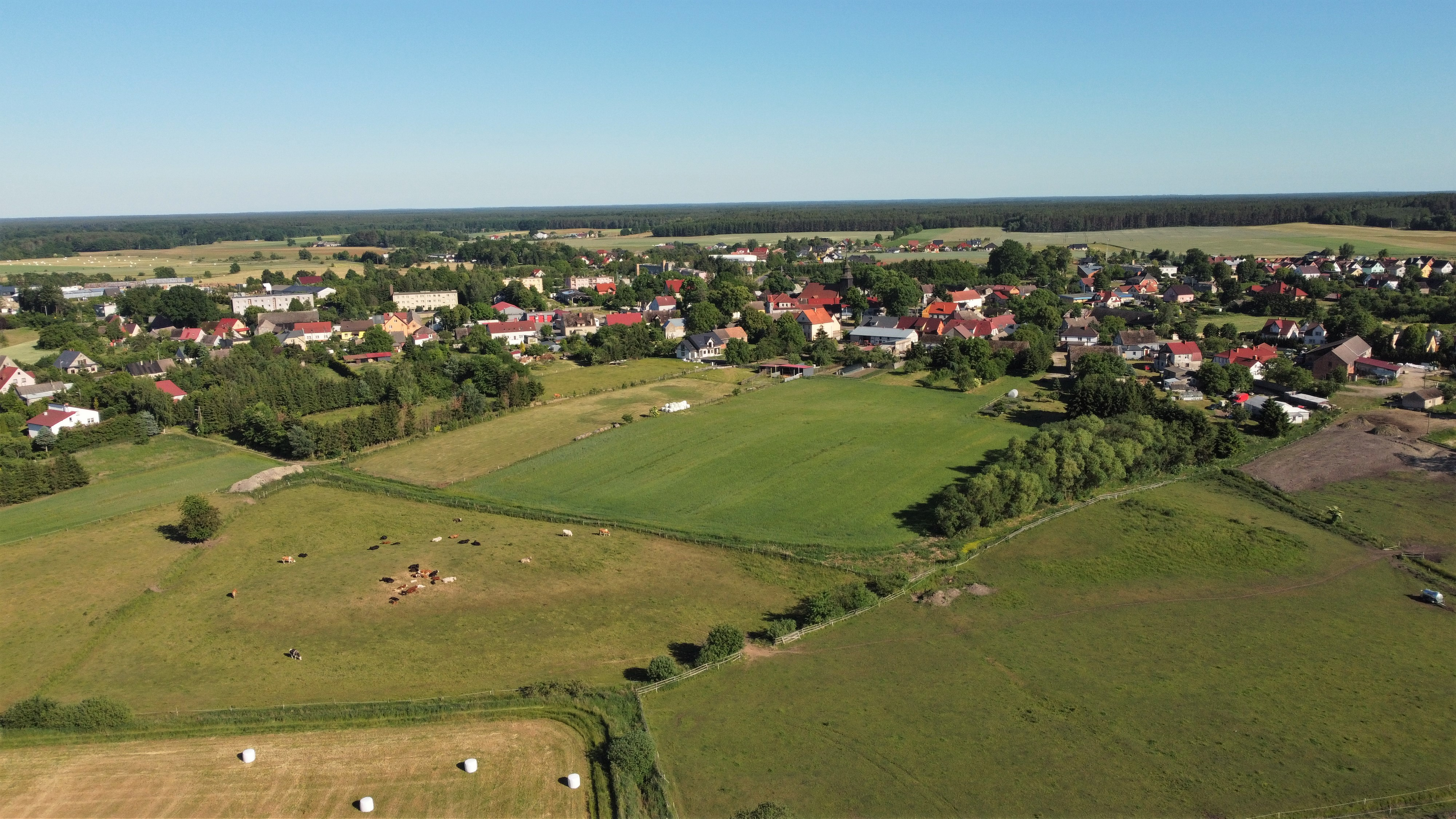
- Aerial view of Przybiernów

- Location within Poland
- Coordinates: 53°45′30″N 14°47′4″E
- Country: Poland
- Voivodeship: West Pomeranian
- County: Goleniów
- Gmina: Przybiernów

Population
  - Total: 1,700
- Time zone: UTC+1 (CET)
  - Summer (DST): UTC+2 (CEST)
- Vehicle registration: ZGL

Przybiernów [pʂɨˈbjɛrnuf] (German: Pribbernow) is a village in Goleniów County, West Pomeranian Voivodeship, in north-western Poland. It is the seat of the gmina (administrative district) called Gmina Przybiernów. It lies approximately 24 km (15 mi) north of Goleniów and 41 km (25 mi) north of the regional capital Szczecin.

The village has a population of 1,700.
