= Miedwinka =

Location
- Country: Poland
- Voivodeship: West Pomeranian
- County (Powiat): Stargard
- Gmina: Gmina Kobylanka

Physical characteristics
- Source
  - location: near Cisewo
  - coordinates: 53°22′53.9″N 14°52′52.9″E
- Mouth: Miedwie
  - location: Morzyczyn
  - coordinates: 53°20′48″N 14°54′29″E
- Length: 6.52 km (4.05 mi)
- Basin size: 44.33 km^{2} (17.12 mi^{2})

Basin features
- Progression: Płonia→ Oder→ Baltic Sea

Miedwinka is a river of Poland. It terminates in Lake Miedwie, which is drained by the Płonia.
