= Krzekna =

River in Poland

Location
- Country: Poland

Physical characteristics
- Mouth
  - location: Lake Będogoszcz
  - coordinates: 53°14′58″N 14°46′54″E

Basin features
- Progression: Lake Będogoszcz→ Miedwie→ Płonia→ Oder→ Baltic Sea

Krzekna is a river of Poland. The outflow into the western part of Lake Będogoszcz is 9.3 km, which is connected with Lake Miedwie by the Ostrowica Canal, with Lake Glinna considered to be its source.

Krzekna is a receiver of wastewater from the local treatment plant.

== See also ==
- Dobropolski Potok
- Słoneczny Potok
