= Pomeranian Lakeland =

Lakeland in Poland

Coordinates: 53°35′12″N 16°11′15″E

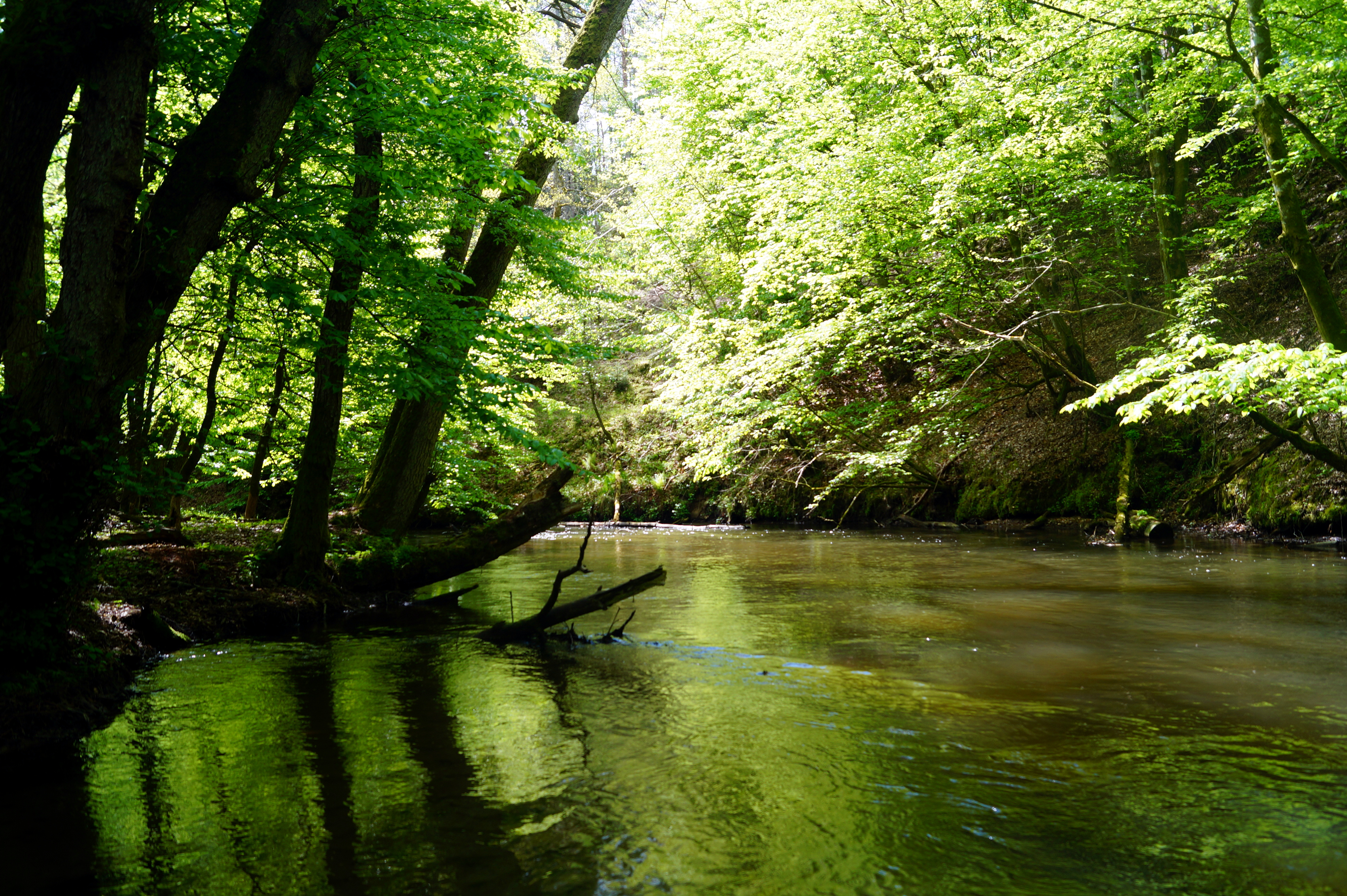
Pomeranian Lakeland

The Pomeranian Lakeland (Polish: Pojezierze Pomorskie; German: Pommersche Seenplatte) is a lakeland in Farther Pomerania. It lies today in the east of the Polish Voivodeship of West Pomerania in northwest Poland.

The lakeland is located in the extreme foothills of the Baltic Uplands and consists of a multitude of lakes. It is of ice age origin and lies embedded between low morainic hills. The lake plateau is very similar to the regions of the Masurian and Mecklenburg lake districts and Holstein Switzerland.

Its largest lake is Lake Drawsko (German: Dratzigsee; 18.66 km²), through which the Drawa flows, the most important river in the region. Its chief settlements are Czaplinek, Szczecinek and Połczyn Zdrój. Because the Pomeranian Lakeland is far less known than the Masurian Lake District, it is unspoiled and undeveloped from a tourist's perspective.

== Literature ==
- Wilhelm Halbfass: Beiträge zur Kenntnis der Pommerschen Seen. Mit 6 Karten. Perthes, Gotha 1901 (Dr. A. Petermanns Mitteilungen aus Justus Perthes' Geographischer Anstalt. Ergänzungsheft 136, ZDB-ID 241574-4), online.
