= Dobropolski Potok =

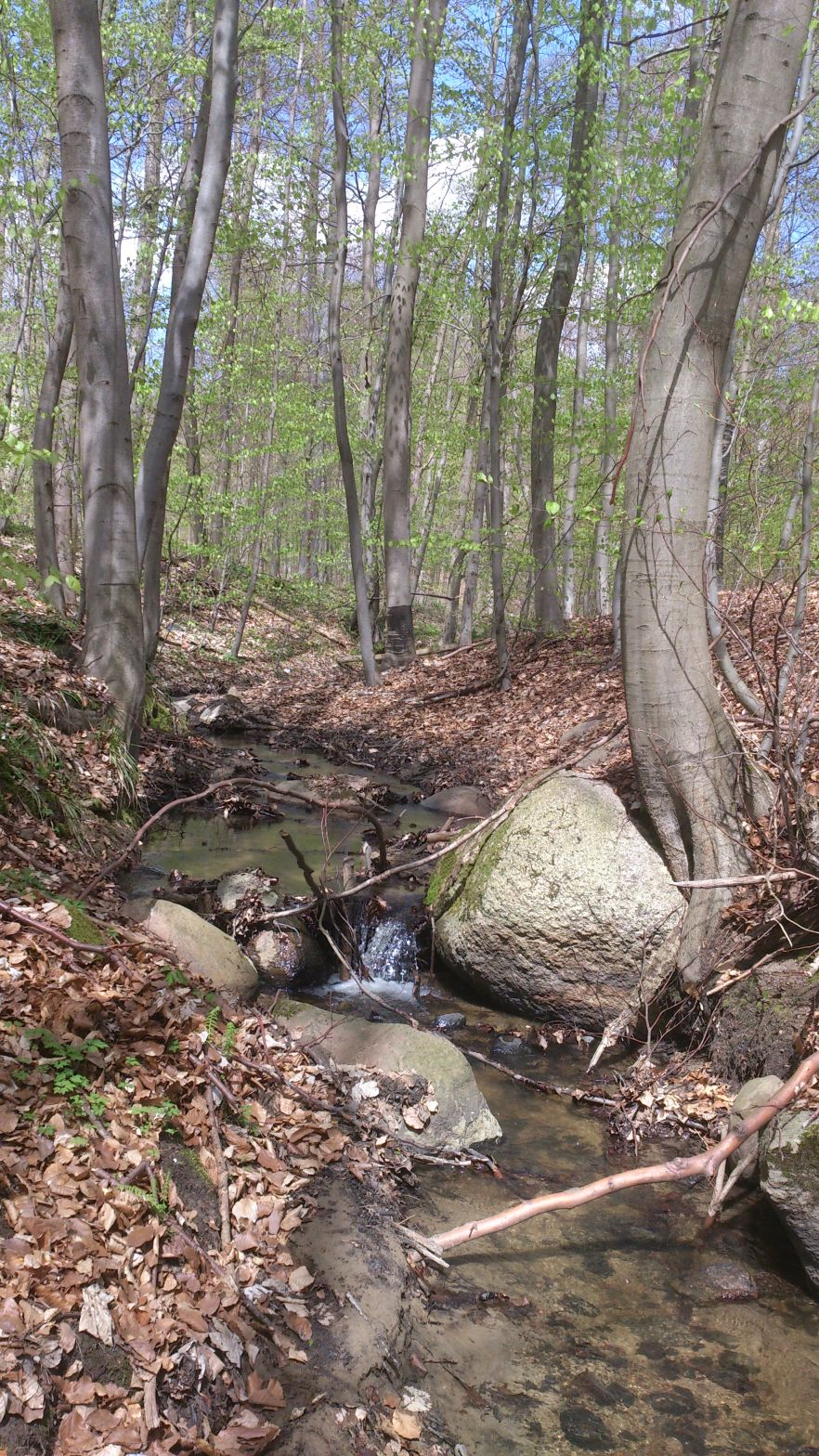

Location
- Country: Poland

Dobropolski Potok is a river of Poland, a tributary of the Krzekna.
