= Rów Kunowski =

Location
- Country: Poland

Physical characteristics
- Mouth: Lake Miedwie
  - location: West of Kunowo, Stargard County
  - coordinates: 53°19′34″N 14°55′08″E
- Length: 3.5 km

Rów Kunowski is a river of Poland that flows into Lake Miedwie.
