= Słoneczny Potok =

Location
- Country: Poland

Słoneczny Potok is a river of Poland, a tributary of the Krzekna.
