= Drawsko Lake =

Lake in Poland

Drawsko
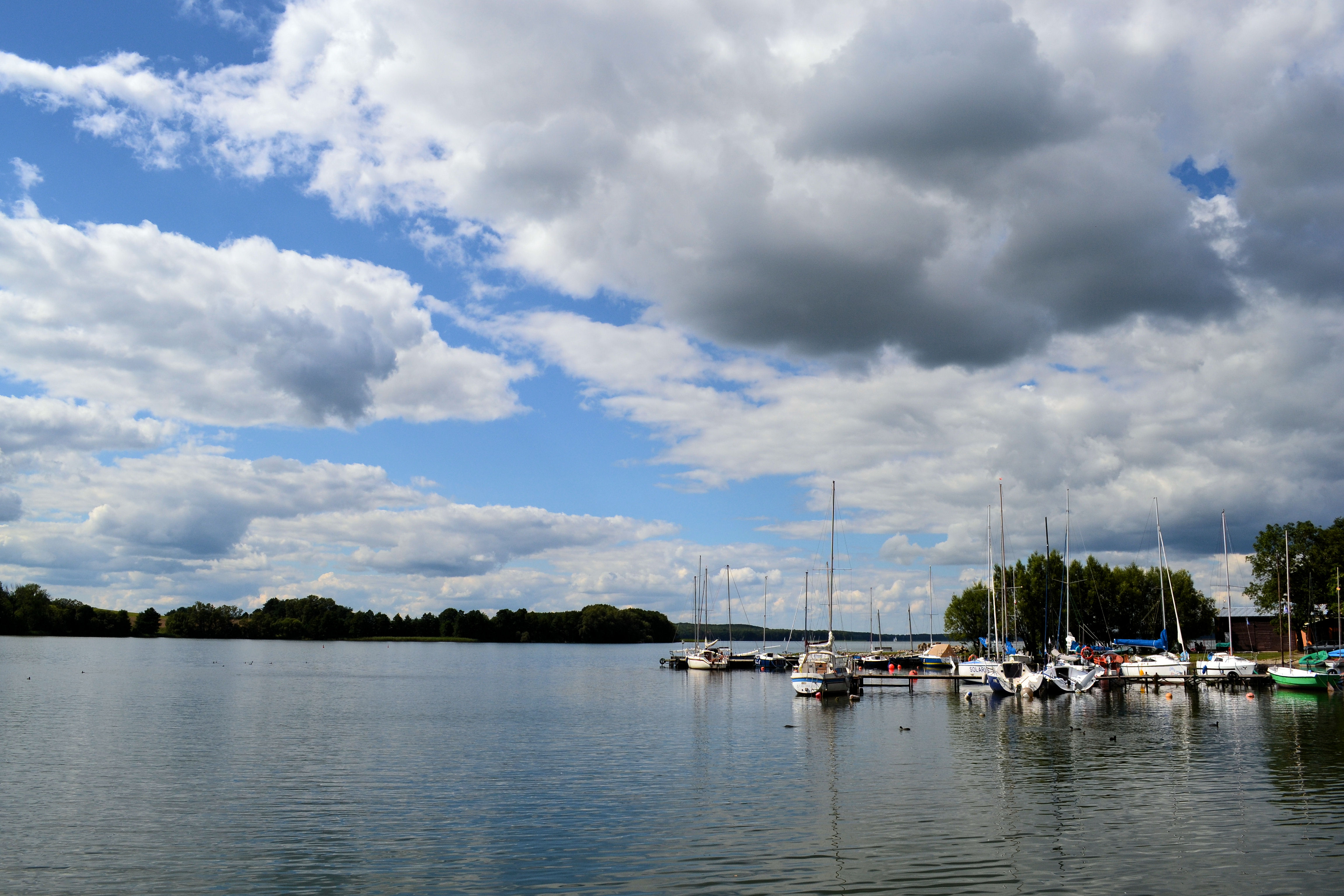
- Marina on the lake

- Location within Poland Location within West Pomeranian Voivodeship
- Location: West Pomeranian Voivodeship, Poland
- Coordinates: 53°35′29″N 16°11′06″E
- Basin countries: Poland
- Max. length: 12.6 km (7.8 mi)
- Max. width: 3.9 km (2.4 mi)
- Surface area: 1,956 ha (4,830 acres)
- Max. depth: 79.7 m (261 ft)

Drawsko (German: Dratzigsee) is a lake located nearby the town of Czaplinek in the West Pomeranian Voivodeship, Poland. It is 1,956 hectares large, 12,6 km long and 3.9 km wide. Maximum depth is 79.7 m, making it the second deepest lake in Poland (after Hańcza Lake).
