= Czaplinek =

Town in West Pomeranian Voivodeship, Poland

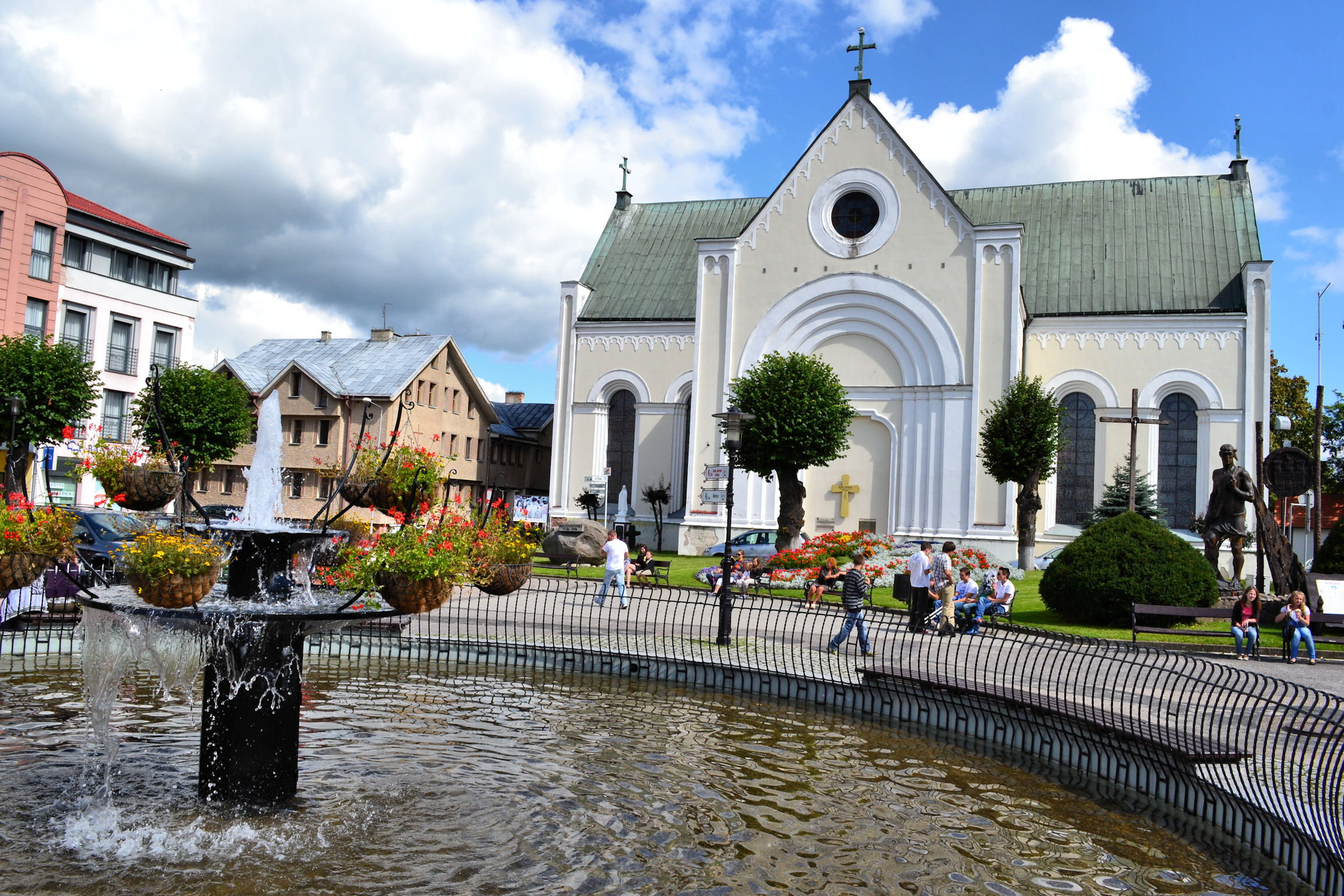
- Market square and Holy Cross church

- Flag Coat of arms

- Location within Poland
- Coordinates: 53°33′N 16°14′E
- Country: Poland
- Voivodeship: West Pomeranian
- County: Drawsko
- Gmina: Czaplinek
- Town rights: 1291

Government
  - Mayor: Marcin Naruszewicz

Area
  - Total: 13.51 km^{2} (5.22 sq mi)
- Elevation: 141 m (463 ft)

Population (31 December 2021)
  - Total: 7,012
  - Density: 519.0/km^{2} (1,344/sq mi)
- Time zone: UTC+1 (CET)
  - Summer (DST): UTC+2 (CEST)
- Postal code: 78-550
- Area code: +48 94
- Car plates: ZDR
- Website: http://www.czaplinek.pl

Czaplinek [t͡ʂaˈplʲinɛk] (German: Tempelburg; Kashubian: Czôplënkò) is a town in Drawsko County, West Pomeranian Voivodeship, Poland, with 7,012 inhabitants as of December 2021. It is situated between Drawsko and Czaplino lakes.

The former name of Tempelburg refers to the Templar Knights, who settled nearby at the orders of King Przemysł II. Until 1668, Czaplinek was a royal town of Poland. Afterwards it was part of Brandenburg, Prussia and Germany, until the end of World War II. It is one of the northernmost towns of the historical region of Greater Poland.

Czaplinek is a local tourist destination, which has the second deepest lake in Poland and a large marina. The main market square features events, exhibitions and annual festivals.

== History ==
=== Prehistory and medieval period ===
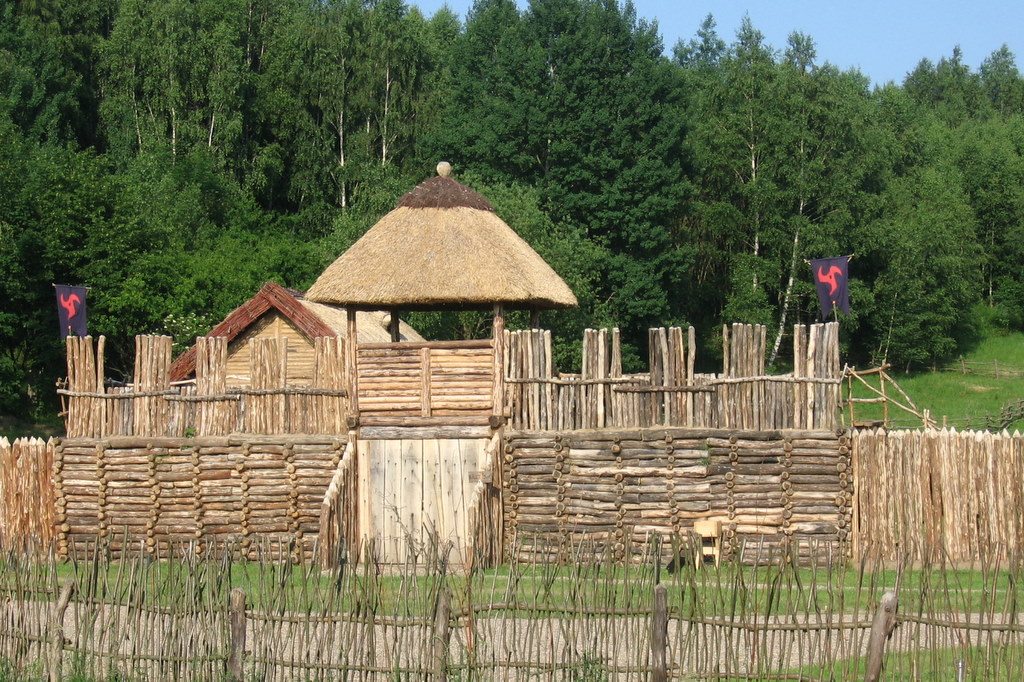
A reconstructed Slavic palisade settlement called gord

The oldest trace of a settlement dates back over 2,500 years; a palisade was once discovered on the island of Bielawa on Drawsko Lake, the second deepest lake in Poland, as well as in the village of Stare Drawsko. The area was initially inhabited by the Goths in the ancient times, followed by the West Slavs, whose settlements called gords were most likely burned down by Duke Bolesław III the Wrymouth, thus incorporating Pomerania into the Polish state. The abundance of isthmuses on the numerous lakes in the region helped to protect the towns from invasions and plunder.

In the autumn of 1286, the Duke of Greater Poland and future King of Poland Przemysł II brought the Templar Knights to a nearby fishing village for defensive purposes, hence the former name of Tempelburg. Czaplinek was granted town rights in 1291 and in around 1300, it was annexed by Brandenburg. In 1345 the Templar estates passed to the Knights Hospitaller. In 1368 the town was purchased by King Casimir III the Great.

=== Modern period ===
For the next centuries Czaplinek remained a part of Poland, as a royal town, administratively in the Wałcz County in the Poznań Voivodeship in the Greater Poland Province. Czaplinek was granted various privileges by Polish kings in 1504, 1635 and 1640. In the 1658 Treaty of Bydgoszcz, it came under the control of Brandenburg-Prussia, and was definitively lost by Poland in 1668, although Poles made diplomatic efforts to regain the town until the First Partition of Poland in 1772, but to no avail. In the 17th century the town experienced rapid development in infrastructure, which increased its population. In 1725 and 1765, Czaplinek was also the site of heavy fires. In the late 18th century the town's castle gradually lost its importance and began to fall into ruin. At the end of the 19th century, Czaplinek was connected via railways to large cities like Szczecin. The construction of roads, cobblestone streets and a proper gas network begun, simultaneously with the establishment of the telegraph.

=== World War II and post-war period ===
During World War II, the Germans established a labor camp for Soviet POWs and prisoners in Czaplinek. A large group of ethnic Poles was also employed as forced labor. The town was part of the so-called Pomeranian Wall, which was a line of defense created by the Germans. It was constructed as a light defensive position in case of an attack from the Second Polish Republic. On 28 January 1945, the town was the site of the first overnight stop during the German-organised march of some 6,000 Polish prisoners of war from the Oflag II-D camp headed westwards. In the final stages of the war, on March 3, 1945, the Battle of Czaplinek took place, in which the First Polish Army defeated the forces of Nazi Germany and captured the town.

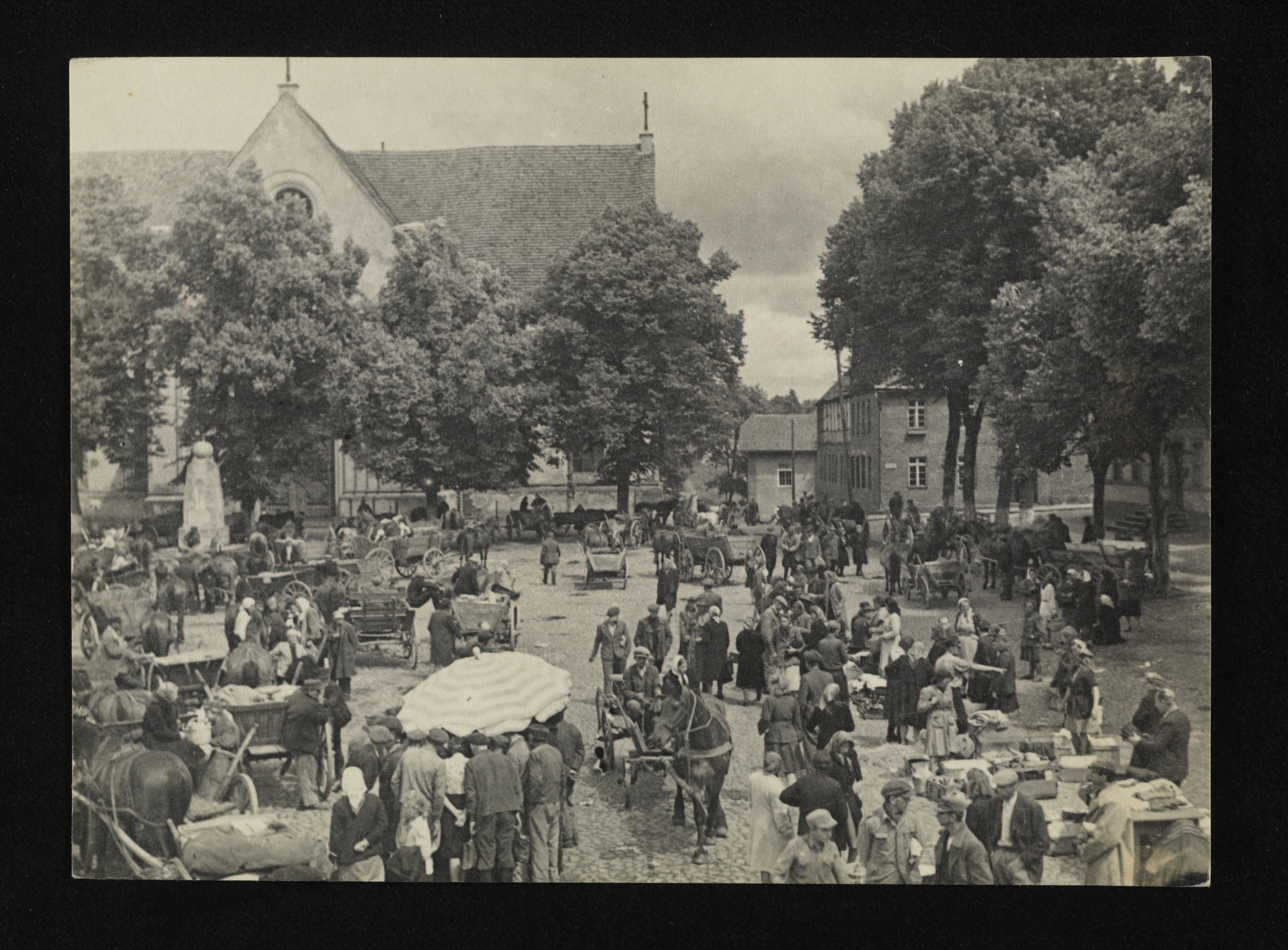
Czaplinek in 1949

Following Germany's defeat in 1945, Czaplinek, as part of historic Greater Poland, was finally reintegrated with Poland. The town's German population was expelled in accordance with the Potsdam Agreement. The remaining pre-war Polish inhabitants of the town, were joined by various other groups of Poles, the first of which were the just freed forced laborers and prisoners of war. The first post-war transport of several hundreds Poles came to Czaplinek on May 17, 1945 from Skierniewice, while the next transports came from former eastern Poland annexed by the Soviet Union, particularly from the Nowogródek and Wilno Voivodeships and the eastern part of the Białystok Voivodeship. In the meantime, German Nazi militias, with the help of some local Germans, carried out terrorist attacks and sabotage acts against Poles. The first 1945 Polish mayor of Czaplinek was Bolesław Kondulski, a freed forced laborer.

After the war, the town's life was organized anew. Already in 1945, restaurants, cafes, shops, bakeries, butcheries, a brewery, a pharmacy, a carbonated water plant and a dairy cooperative were founded. The first post-war primary school was opened in 1945, the first preschool was opened in 1947, the vocational school in 1949.

In 2005, a monument of Pope John Paul II was unveiled in Czaplinek on the 50th anniversary of his visit to the town as a young priest.

== Tourism ==
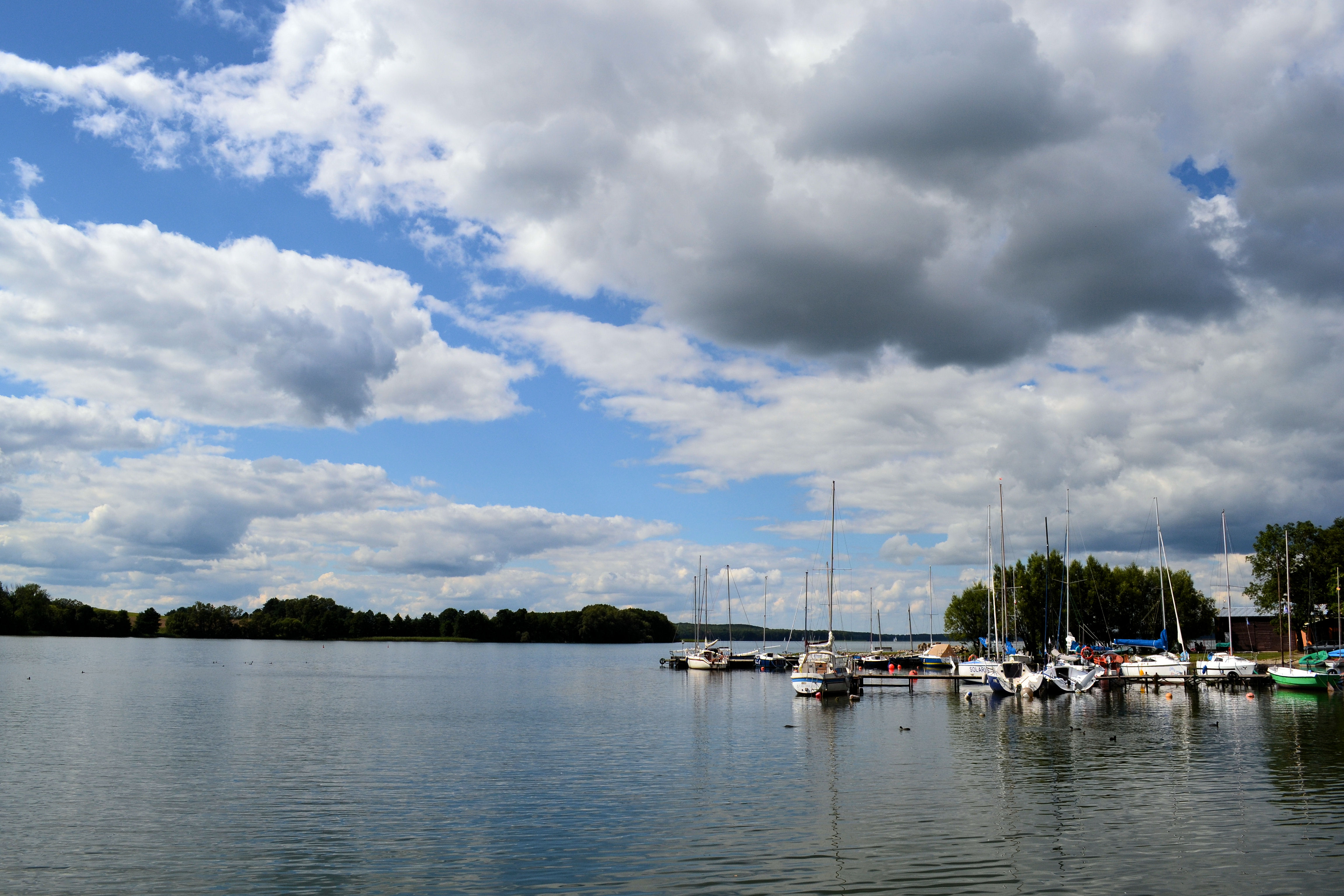
Drawsko Lake marina. It is the second deepest lake in Poland and a local tourist attraction

Czaplinek is a tourist town and a popular destination for holidaymakers in West Pomerania. There is a large marina located on the Drawsko Lake, which attracts tourists from all over the region and other provinces. A gathering of Harley-Davidson motorcycles also occurs annually as well as an exhibition of pigeons and doves.

Other points of interest include the reconstructed early medieval Slavic stronghold Sławogród and the Gothic Holy Trinity church, which is the oldest preserved brick building of Czaplinek. There is also a local museum (Izba Muzealna).

== Education ==
There are several schools in the town, including a primary school, high school, and a kindergarten.

== Gallery ==
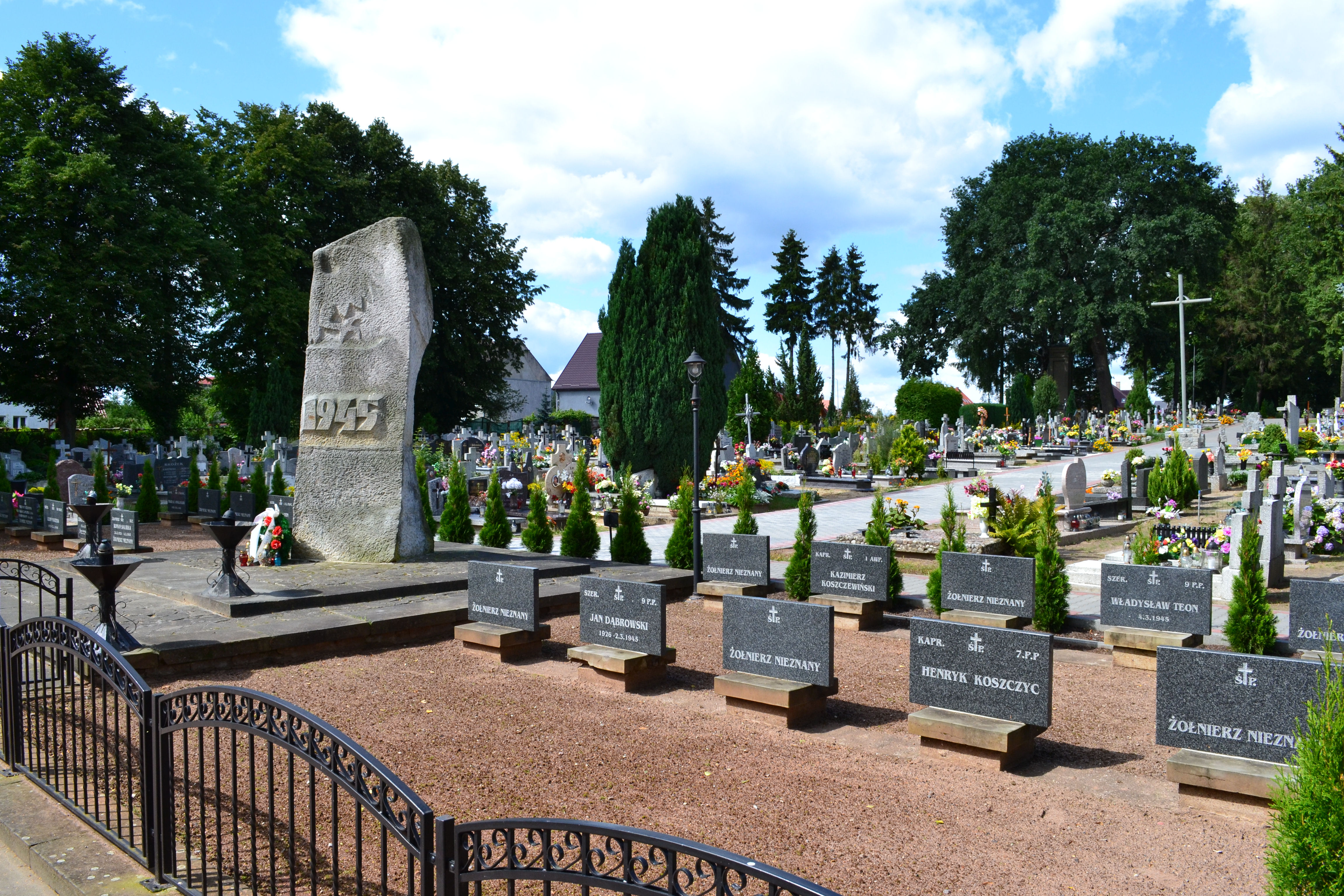
Graves of Polish soldiers fallen in the Battle of Czaplinek

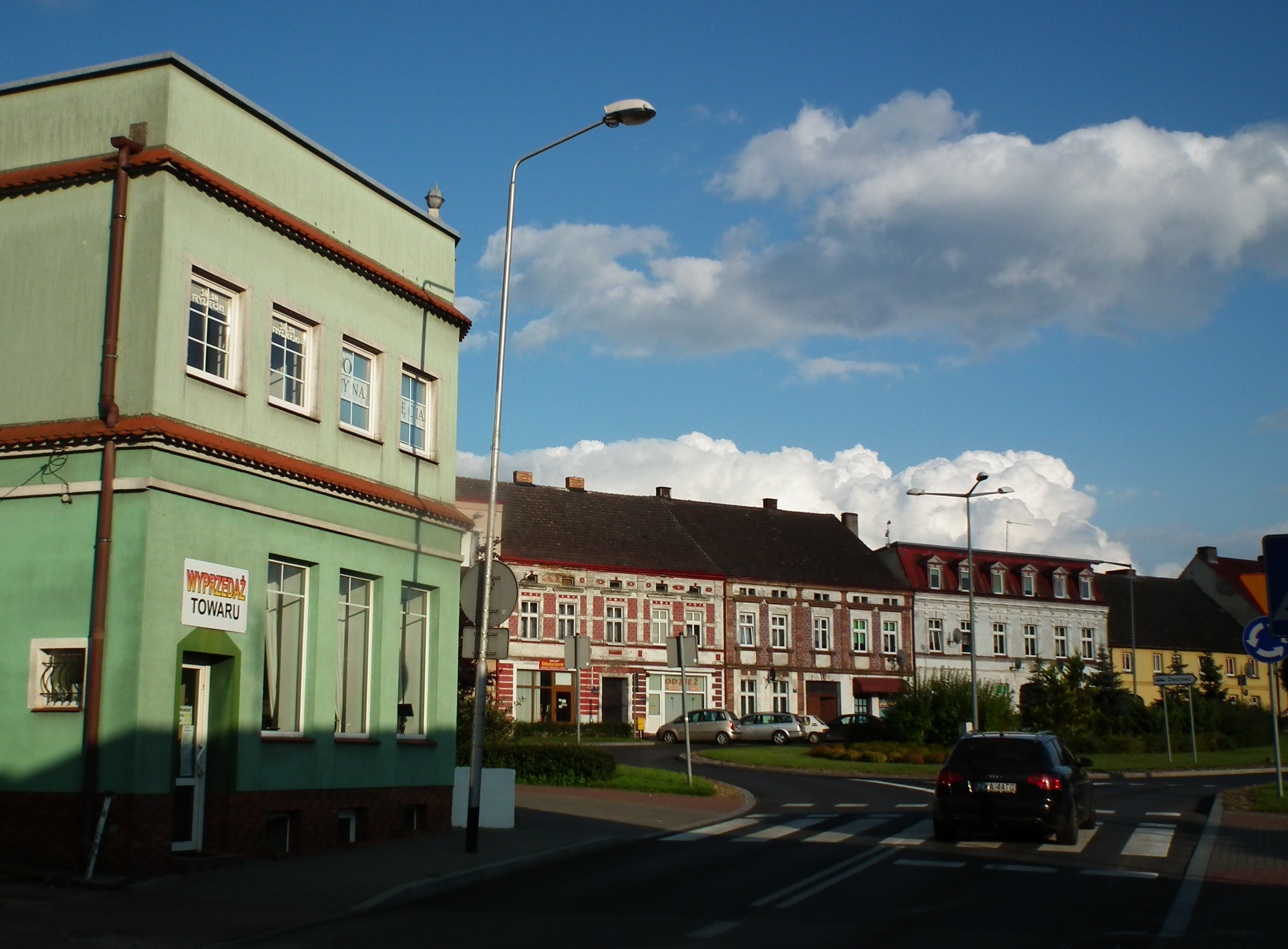
Historic townhouses in the town center

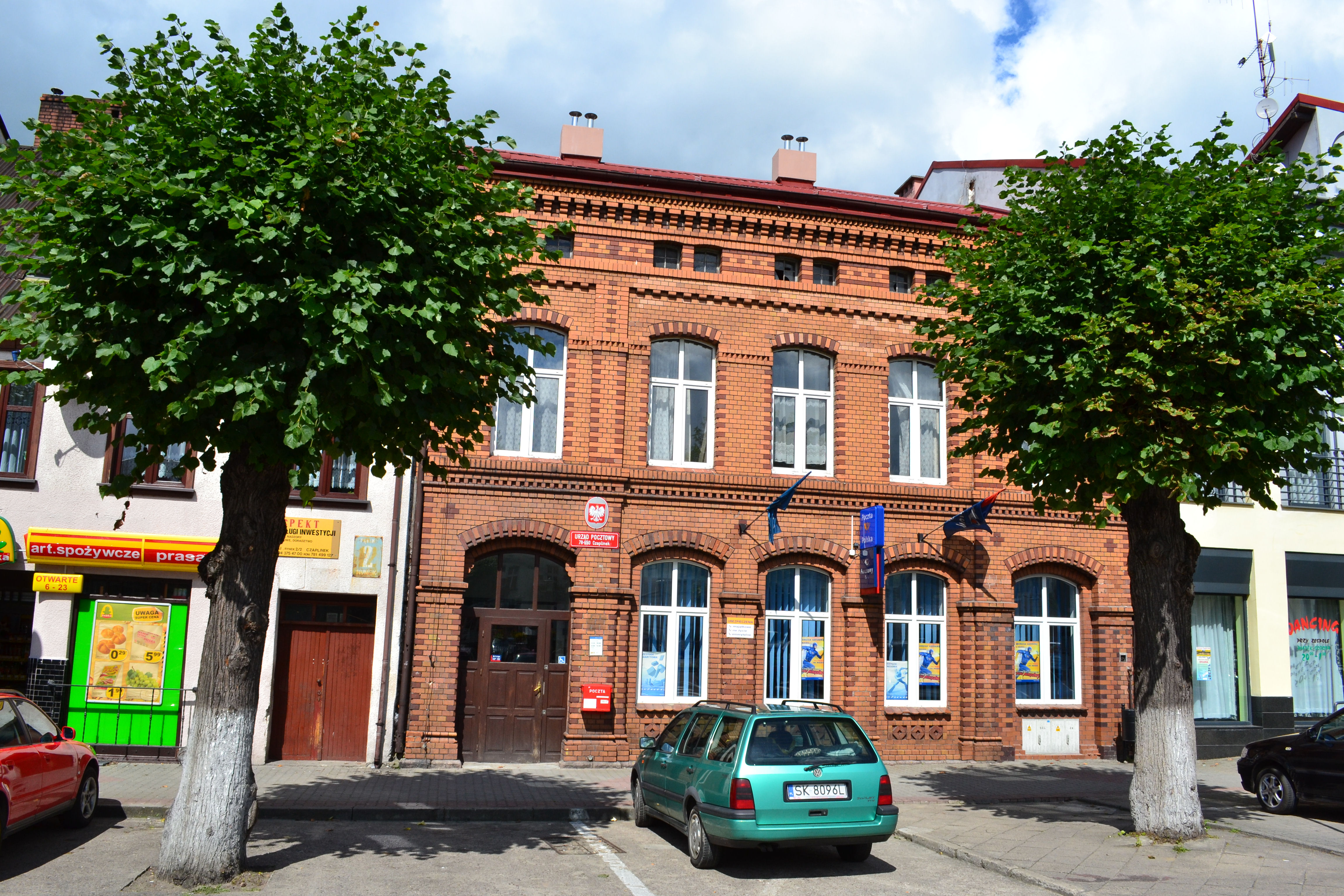
Post office

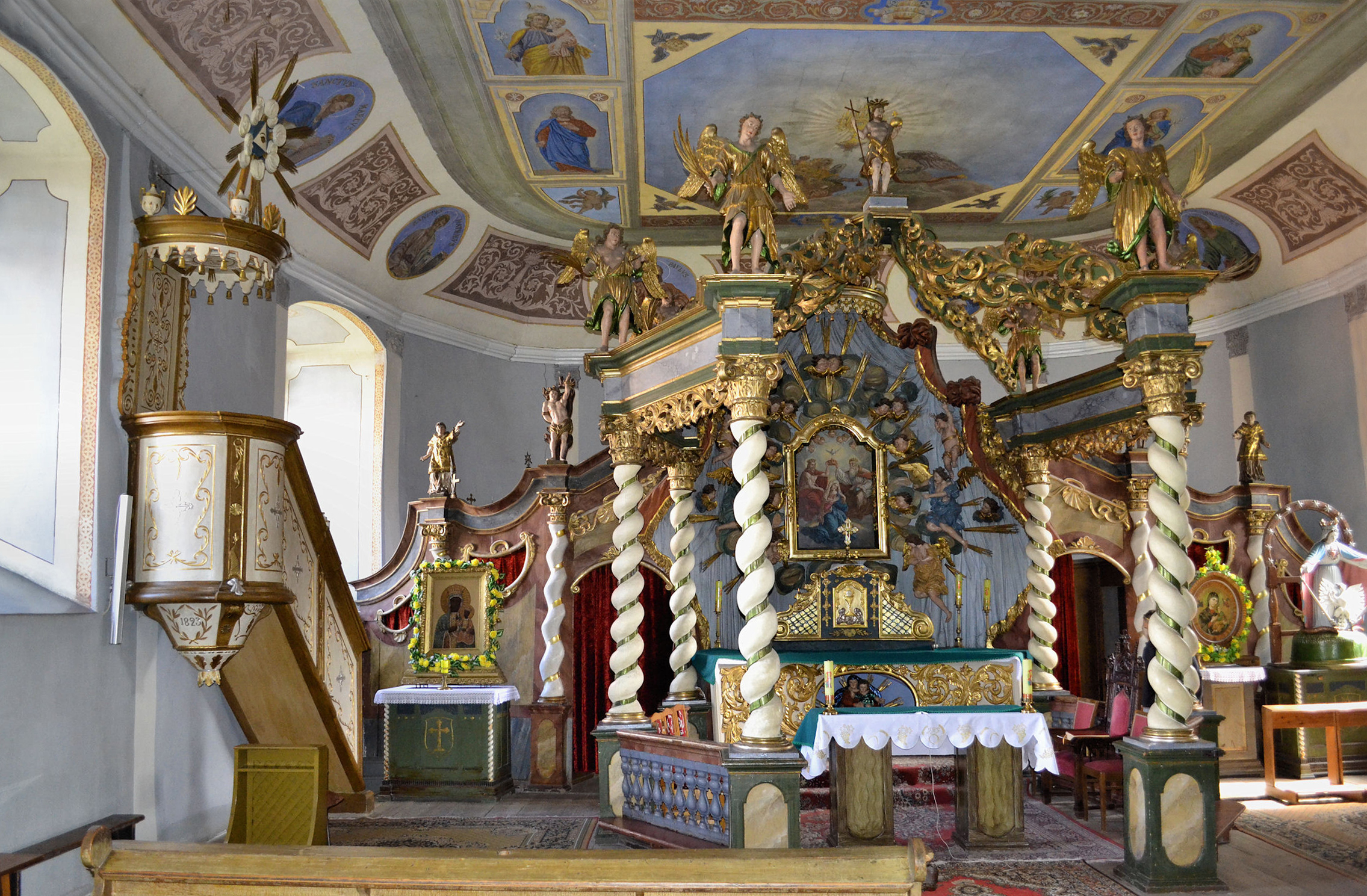
Interior of the Holy Trinity Church

== Notable people ==
- August T. Dorn (1849–1923) an American farmer and politician, emigrated with his parents to the USA in 1860 and settled in Oshkosh, Wisconsin. He served in the Wisconsin State Assembly
- Longin Komołowski (1948–2016), Polish activist and politician
