= Miedwie =

Lake in Poland

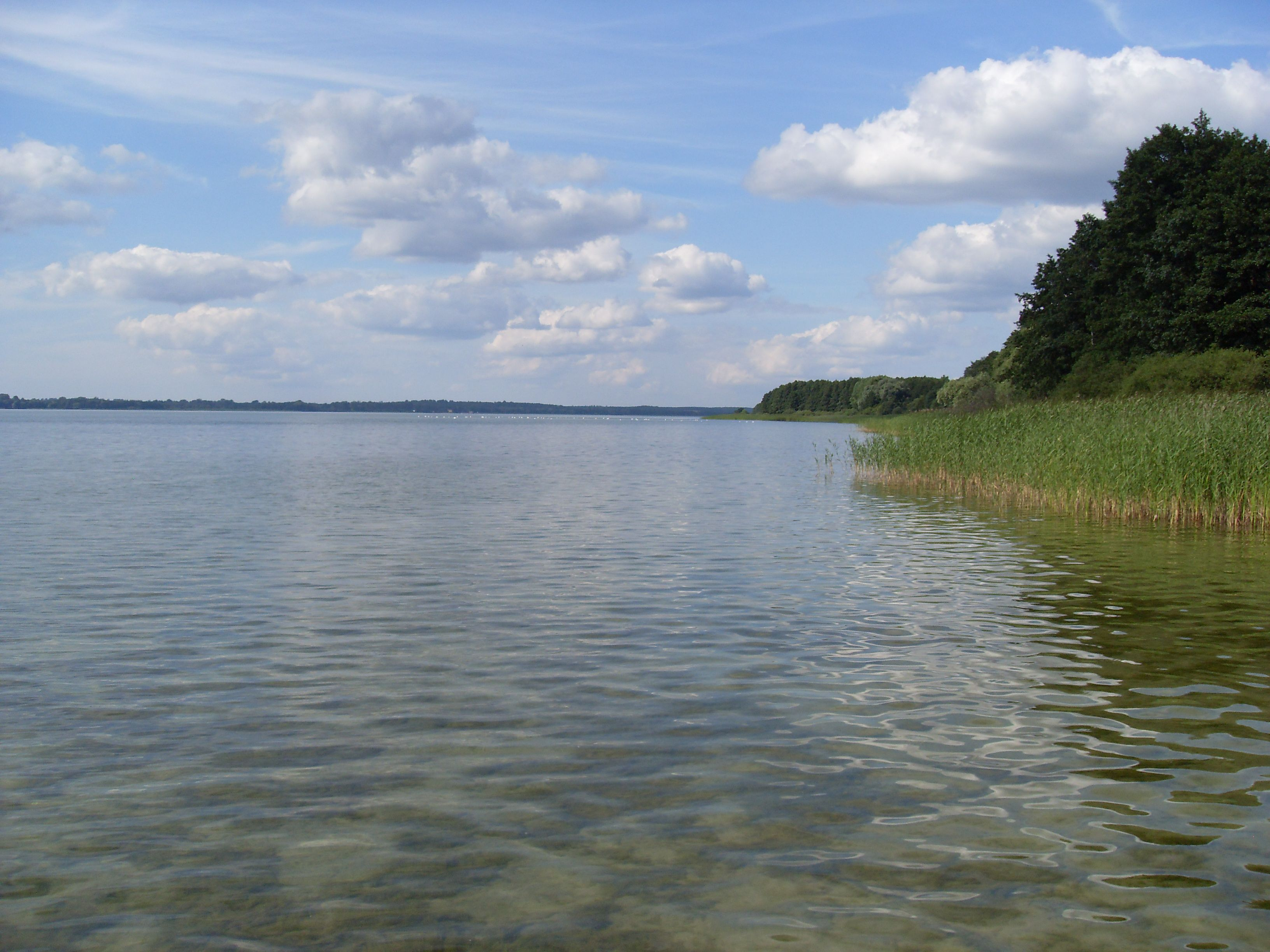
- Miedwie

- Location within Poland
- Location: Pomeranian Lakeland
- Coordinates: 53°16′47″N 14°53′10″E
- Primary inflows: Płonia
- Primary outflows: Płonia
- Basin countries: Poland
- Max. length: 16.2 km (10.1 mi)
- Max. width: 3.2 km (2.0 mi)
- Surface area: 35 km^{2} (14 sq mi)
- Max. depth: 43.8 m (144 ft)
- Settlements: Stargard

Miedwie (Polish: Jezioro Miedwie, German: Madüsee, Madüesee, Madüe, Maddüie) is a lake in the Pomeranian Lakeland region of West Pomeranian Voivodship, in northwestern Poland.

== Geography ==
The lake is 35 km^{2} (14 sq mi) in surface area. It is 16.2 km long and 3.2 km wide. Its maximum depth is 43.8 m.

The lake has a 150m long pier.

Miedwie lake and its surrounding area is a Natura 2000 EU Special Protection Area.

== Waterworks ==
There is a waterworks on the lake that typically produces between 82 and 84 cubic metres of fresh drinking water daily to supply the city of Szczecin. The Szczecin water utility leverages the 30-meter elevation drop between the Miedwie lake intake and the city's distribution network to drive a specialized water turbine, effectively transforming the gravitational flow into sustainable green energy to power the treatment process.

== See also ==
- Natura 2000 in Poland
- Rów Kunowski
- Special Protection Areas in Poland
