= Płonia (river) =

Coordinates: 53°24′08″N 14°39′22″E

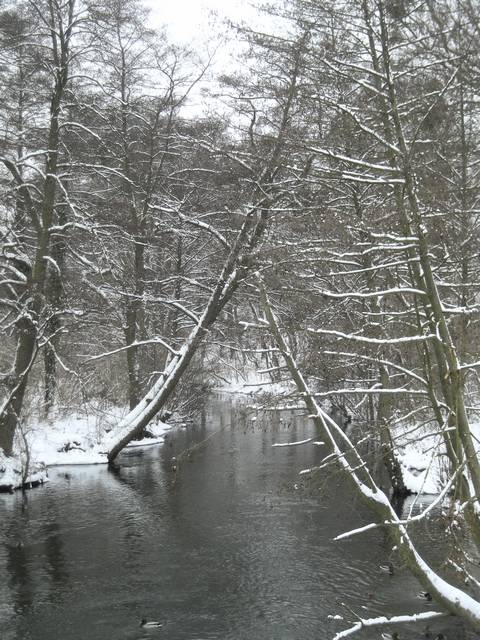
- Płonia in Jezierzyce, Szczecin

Location
- Country: Poland
- Region: West Pomeranian Voivodeship

Physical characteristics
- Source
  - location: 1.5 km south of Barlinek, Gmina Barlinek, Myślibórz County
  - elevation: 48 m (157 ft)
- Mouth
  - location: Dąbie Lake, Dąbie, Szczecin
  - elevation: 1 m (3 ft 3 in)
- Length: 74.3 km (46.2 mi)
- Basin size: 1,101 km^{2} (425 sq mi)
- Discharge
  - location: mouth
  - average: 3.81 m^{3}/s (135 cu ft/s)

Basin features
- Progression: Oder→ Baltic Sea
- Tributaries
  - left: Ostrowica
  - right: Strzelica

The Płonia (German: Plöne) is a river in West Pomeranian Voivodeship, Poland, a right tributary of the Oder river, with a length of 74.3 km and a basin area of 1101 km^{2}. Its source is 1.5 south of Barlinek. The river flows northwest through Miedwie and Płoń lake. The Płonia flows into Dąbie Lake in Dąbie, Szczecin.

The upper portion of the Płonia is comparatively unpolluted, therefore trout can be found there.
