= List of municipalities in the Province of Pomerania =

This list of municipalities in the Province of Pomerania is based on the information found in Amtliches Gemeindeverzeichnis für das Deutsche Reich auf Grund der Volkszählung 1939 and Ortsnamenverzeichnis der Ortschaften jenseits von Oder und Neiße

Name	Kreis (before 1945)	Gemeinde today	Amt today	Landkreis today	Polish name today	Gmina today	Powiat today
Aalkist	Regenwalde				Olchowiec	Gmina Drawsko Pomorskie	Drawsko
Aarhorst	Friedeberg				Tuczępy	Gmina Drezdenko	Strzelce Krajeńskie-Drzedenko
Abtshagen	Grimmen	Wittenhagen	Miltzow	Vorpommern-Rügen			
Abtshagen	Schlawe				Dobiesław	Gmina Darłowo	Sławno
Ackerhof	Köslin				Chlebowo	Gmina Bobolice	Koszalin
Adlig Kublitz	Stolp				Kobylniczka	Kobylnica	Słupsk
Adlig Landeck	Flatow				(nicht mehr existent)		
Adolfsheide	Bütow				Przewóz	Studzienice	Bytów
Ahlbeck	Uecker-münde	Ahlbeck	Am Stettiner Haff	Uecker-Randow			
Ahlbeck	Usedom-Wollin	Heringsdorf	(amtsfrei)	Ost-vorpommern			
Ahrenshagen	Franzburg-Barth	Ahrenshagen-Daskow	Ribnitz-Damgarten	Vorpommern-Rügen			
Ahrenshoop	Franzburg-Barth	Ahrenshoop	Darß/Fischland	Vorpommern-Rügen			
Albertinenhof	Saatzig				Mokrzyca	Chociwel	Stardgard
Alt Banzin	Köslin				Będzino	Będzino	Koszalin
Alt Beelitz	Friedeberg				Stare Bielice	Gmina Drezdenko	Strzelce Krajeński-Drezdenko
Alt Belz	Köslin				Stare Bielice	Biesiekierz	Koszalin
Alt Bewersdorf	Schlawe				Bobrowice	Sławno	Sławno
Altbork	Kolberg-Körlin				Stary Borek	Kołobrzeg	Kołobrzeg
Alt Damerow	Saatzig				Stara Dąbrowa	Stara Dąbrowa	Stargard
Alt Damerow	Stolp				Stara Dąbrowa	Damnica	Słupsk
Alt Döberitz	Regenwalde				Stara Dobrzyca	Resko	Łobez
Alt Draheim	Neustettin				Stare Drawsko	Czaplinek	Drawsko
Altefähr	Rügen	Altefähr	West-Rügen	Rügen			
Altenfließ	Friedeberg				Przyłęg	Strzelce Krajeńskie	Strzelce-Drezdenko
Altenhagen	Demmin	Altenhagen	Treptower Tollensewinkel	Demmin			
Altenhagen	Franzburg-Barth	Velgast	Franzburg-Richtenberg	Vorpommern-Rügen			
Altenhagen	Schlawe				Jeżyce	Gmina Darłowo	Sławno
Altenkirchen	Rügen	Altenkirchen	Nord-Rügen	Rügen			
Altenpleen	Franzburg-Barth	Altenpleen	Altenpleen	Vorpommern-Rügen			
Altensien	Rügen	Sellin	Mönchgut-Granitz	Rügen			
Altenwalde	Neustettin				Liszkowo	Borne Sulinowo	Szczecinek
Altenwedel	Saatzig				Sicko	Recz	Choszczno
Alt Falkenberg	Pyritz				Chabowo	Bielice	Pyrzyce
Alt Grape	Pyritz				Stare Chrapowo	Bielice	Pyrzyce
Alt Gurkowsch-bruch	Friedeberg				Górecko	Zwierzyn	Strzelce-Drezdenko
Alt Gutzmerow	Stolp				Choćmirowo	Główczyce	Słupsk
Althagen	Ueckermünde				Brzózki	Nowe Warpno	Police
Althammer	Lauenburg (Pommern)				Kostkowo	Gniewino	Wejherowo
Altheide	Saatzig				Sierakowo	Dobrzany	Stargard
Althütte	Arnswalde				Łasko	Bierzwnik	Choszczno
Althütten	Neustettin				Stare Łozice	Gmina Bobolice	Koszalin
Alt Järshagen	Schlawe				Stary Jarosław	Gmina Darłowo	Sławno
Alt Jugelow	Stolp				Gogolewo	Dębnica Kaszubska	Słupsk
Altkarbe	Friedeberg				Stare Kurowo	Stare Kurowo	Strzelce-Drezdenko
Alt Kentzlin	Demmin	Kentzlin	Demmin-Land	Demmin			
Alt Kolziglow	Rummels-burg				Kołczygłowy	Kołczygłowy	Bytów
Alt Klücken	Arnswalde				Stary Klukom	Choszczno	Choszczno
Alt Körtnitz	Dramburg				Stara Korytnica	Kalisz Pomorski	Drawsko
Alt Koprieben	Neustettin				Stare Koprzywno	Barwice	Szczecinek
Alt Krakow	Schlawe	-			Stary Kraków	Sławno	Sławno
Alt Kuddezow	Schlawe				Chudaczewo	Postomino	Sławno
Alt Kugelwitz	Schlawe				Kowalewice	Gmina Darłowo	Sławno
Alt Liepenfier	Neustettin				Czarnkowie	Połczyn Zdrój	Świdwin
Alt Lobitz	Deutsch Krone				Łowicz Wałecki	Mirosławiec	Wałcz
Alt Lülfitz	Belgard				Lulewice	Białogard	Białogard
Alt Paalow	Schlawe				Pałowo	Postomino	Sławno
Alt Priebkow	Neustettin				Przybkowo	Barwice	Szczecinek
Alt Prilipp	Pyritz				Stary Przylep	Warnice	Pyrzyce
Alt Reddevitz	Rügen	Middelhagen	Mönchgut-Granitz	Rügen			
Alt Sanskow	Belgard				Zajączkowo	Połczyn Zdrój	Świdwin
Altsarnow	Cammin				Żarnowo	Stepnica	Goleniów
Alt Schlage	Belgard				Sława	Świdwin	Świdwin
Alt Schlawe	Schlawe				Sławsko	Sławno	Sławno
Alt Storkow	Saatzig				Storkowo	Ińsko	Stargard
Alt Stüdnitz	Dramburg				Stara Studnica	Kalisz Pomorski	Drawsko
Alt Tellin	Demmin	Alt Tellin	Jarmen-Tutow	Demmin			
Alt Tramm	Kolberg-Körlin				Stramnica	Kołobrzeg	Kołobrzeg
Alt Valm	Neustettin				Stary Chwalim	Barwice	Szczecinek
Altwarp	Ueckermünde	Altwarp	Am Stettiner Haff	Uecker-Randow			
Alt Warschow	Schlawe				Warszkowo	Sławno	Sławno
Alt Werder	Kolberg-Körlin				Korzystno	Kołobrzeg	Kołobrzeg
Alt Wuhrow	Dramburg				Stare Worowo	Złocieniec	Drawsko
Alt Zowen	Schlawe				Sowno	Sianów	Koszalin
Amalienhof	Cammin				Wierzchoslaw	Goleniów	Goleniów
Angerode	Grimmen	Gremersdorf-Buchholz	Franzburg-Richtenberg	Vorpommern-Rügen			
Annaberg	Dramburg				Jelenino	Szczecinek	Szczecinek
Appelwerder	Deutsch Krone				Jabłonowo	Mirosławiec	Wałcz
Armenheide	Ueckermünde				Grzepnica	Dobra	Police
Arnhausen	Belgard				Lipie	Rąbino	Białogard
Arnimswalde	Naugard				Załom	Szczecin	(city county)
Arnsberg	Greifenberg				Gorzysław	Trzebiatów	Gryfice
Arnsfelde	Deutsch Krone				Gostomia	Wałcz	Wałcz
Arnshagen	Stolp				Charnowo	Ustka	Słupsk
Ascherbude	Netzekreis				Biernatowo	Trzcianka	Czarnków-Trzcianka
Aschersleben	Ueckermünde	Ferdinandshof	Torgelow-Ferdinandshof	Uecker-Randow			
Aschersruhe (ab 1936 = Redlinsfelde)	Cammin				Redliny	Świerzno	Kamień
Aspenau	Flatow				Osowo	Lipka	Złotów
Auenfelde	Neustettin				Przyjezierze	Borne Sulinowo	Szczecinek
Augustendorf	Flatow				Augustowo	Krajenka	Złotów
Augustin	Köslin				Raduska	Koszalin	(city county)
Augustwalde	Arnswalde				Rębusz	Bierzwnik	Choszczno
Baabe	Rügen	Baabe	Mönchgut-Granitz	Rügen			
Babbin	Pyritz				Babin	Bielice	Pyrzyce
Bärenwalde	Schlochau				Bińcze	Czarne	Człuchów
Bahrenberg	Neustettin				Grzywnik	Borne Sulinowo	Szczecinek
Bahrenbusch	Neustettin				Brokęcino	Okonek	Złotów
Baldekow	Kolberg-Körlin				Białokury	Siemyśl	Kołobrzeg
Balenthin	Schlawe				Białęcino	Malechowo	Sławno
Balfans	Neustettin				Białowąs	Barwice	Szczecinek
Ball	Saatzig				Biała	Dobrzany	Stargard
Ballenberg	Belgard				Biała Góra	Rąbino	Świdwin
Balm	Usedom-Wollin	Benz	Usedom-Süd	Ost-vorpommern			
Balsdrey	Belgard				Biały Zdrój	Sławoborze	Świdwin
Bandesow	Cammin				Będzieszewo	Świerzno	Kamień
Bandsechow	Stolp				Będziechowo	Główczyce	Słupsk
Bannemin	Usedom-Wollin	Mölschow	Usedom-Nord	Ost-vorpommern			
Bansin	Usedom-Wollin	Heringsdorf	(No Amt)	Ost-vorpommern			
Barckow	Greifenberg				Barkowo	Gryfice	Gryfice
Barenbruch	Naugard				Niedźwiedź	Kobylanka	Stargard Szeczeciński
Barfußdorf	Naugard				Żółwia Błoć	Goleniów	Goleniów
Barken	Neustettin				Borki	Okonek	Złotów
Barkenbrügge	Neustettin				(no longer exists)		
Barkenfelde	Schlochau				Barkowo	Człuchów	Człuchów
Barkotzen	Rummels-burg				Barkocin	Kołczygłowy	Bytów
Barnims-kunow	Pyritz				Barnim	Warnice	Pyrzyce
Barnimslow	Greifen-hagen				Barnisław	Kołbaskowo	Police
Barskewitz-Gollin	Saatzig				Barzkowice	Stargard Szczeciński	Stargard
Bartelshagen	Franzburg-Barth	Bartelshagen	Barth	Vorpommern-Rügen			
Bartikow	Greifen-hagen				Bartkowo	Gryfino	Gryfino
Bartin	Kolberg-Körlin				Bardy	Dygowo	Kołobrzeg
Bartin	Rummels-burg				Barcino	Kępice	Słupsk
Bartmanns-hagen	Grimmen	Süderholz	(No Amt)	Vorpommern-Rügen			
Bartow	Demmin	Bartow	Treptower Tollensewinkel	Demmin			
Barvin	Rummels-burg				Barwino	Kępice	Słupsk
Barzlin	Köslin				Bardzlino	Świeszyno	Koszalin
Barzwitz	Schlawe				Barzowice	Gmina Darłowo	Sławno
Basenthin	Cammin				Bodzęcin	Osina	Goleniów
Battin	Belgard				Batyń	Rąbino	Świdwin
Battrow	Flatow				Batorowo	Lipka	Złotów
Batzlaff	Cammin				Baczysław	Golczewo	Kamień
Batzwitz	Greifenberg				Baszewice	Gryfice	Gryfice
Bauerhufen	Köslin				Chłopy	Mielno	Koszalin
Baumgarten	Cammin				Włodzisław	Przybiernów	Goleniów
Baumgarten	Dramburg				Gudowo	Gmina Drawsko Pomorskie	Drawsko
Bayershöhe	Greifen-hagen				Steklinko	Gryfino	Gryfino
Beckel	Stolp				Wiklino	Słupsk	Słupsk
Bedlin	Stolp				Bydlino	Słupsk	Słupsk
Beelitz	Pyritz				Bielice	Bielice	Pyrzyce
Beelkow	Schlawe				Bielkowo	Sianów	Koszalin
Beestland	Grimmen	Warrenzin	Demmin-Land	Demmin			
Beggerow	Demmin	Beggerow	Demmin-Land	Demmin			
Behlkow	Greifenberg				Bielikowo	Brojce	Gryfyce
Behnkendorf	Grimmen	Behnkendorf	Miltzow	Vorpommern-Rügen			
Behnken-hagen	Grimmen	Süderholz	(No Amt)	Vorpommern-Rügen			
Belgard a.d. Leba	Lauenburg				Białogarda	Wicko	Lębork
Belkow	Greifen-hagen				Bielkowo	Kobylanka	Stargard
Bellin	Uecker-münde	Ueckermünde	(No Amt)	Uecker-Randow			
Belling	Uecker-münde	Jatznick	Uecker-Randow-Tal	Uecker-Randow			
Benz	Cammin				Benice	Kamień Pomorski	Kamień
Benz	Usedom-Wollin	Benz	Usedom-Süd	Ost-vorpommern			
Benzin	Stolp				Bięcino	Damnica	Słupsk
Bergelau	Schlochau				Czarnoszki	Człuchów	Człuchów
Bergensin	Lauenburg				Bargędzino	Wicko	Lębork
Bergland	Naugard				Bystra	Goleniów	Goleniów
Berkenbrügge	Arnswalde				Brzeziny	Drawno	Choszczno
Berkenow	Belgard				Berkanowo	Świdwin	Świdwin
Bernhagen	Naugard				Ostrzyca	Nowogard	Goleniów
Bernsdorf	Neustettin				Krągłe	Szczecinek	Szczecinek
Bernsdorf	Regenwalde				Brzeźnica	Węgorzyno	Łobez
Bernsee	Arnswalde				Breń	Bierzwnik	Choszczno
Besow	Schlawe				Bzowo	Kobylnica	Słupsk
Beßwitz	Rummels-burg				Biesowice	Kępice	Słupsk
Betken-hammer	Deutsch Krone				Ptusza	Tarnówka	Złotów
Bevilsthal	Deutsch Krone				Pieczyska	Człopa	Wałcz
Bewerdick	Neustettin				Komorze	Borne Sulinowo	Szczecinek
Beweringen	Saatzig				Bobrowniki	Chociwel	Stargard
Bewersdorf	Stolp				Bobrowniki	Damnica	Słupsk
Beyersdorf	Pyritz				Tetyń	Kozielice	Pyrzyce
Bial	Rummels-burg				Biała	Miastko	Bytów
Billerbeck	Pyritz				Nadarzyn	Pełczyce	Choszczno
Binow	Greifen-hagen				Binowo	Stare Czarnowo	Gryfino
Binz	Rügen	Binz	(No Amt)	Rügen			
Birkbruch	Friedeberg				Brzezinka	Zwierzyn	Strzelce-Drezdenko
Birkenwalde	Naugard				Brzozowo	Nowogard	Goleniów
Birkenwerder	Naugard				Pogrzymie	Maszewo	Goleniów
Birkholz	Deutsch Krone				Brzeźniak	Człopa	Wałcz
Birkholz	Dramburg				Kosobudy	Złocieniec	Drawsko
Birkholz	Friedeberg				Brzoza	Strzelce Krajeńskie	Strzelce Krajeńskie-Drzedenko
Birkow	Stolp				Bierkowo	Słupsk	Słupsk
Bischofswalde	Schlochau				Biskupnica	Człuchów	Człuchów
Bischofthum	Neustettin				Biskupice	Biały Bór	Szczecinek
Bismark	Lauenburg				Łęczyn	Łęczyce	Wejherowo
Bismark	Uecker-münde	Ramin	Löcknitz-Penkun	Uecker-Randow	-		
Biziker	Köslin				Biesiekierz	Biesiekierz	Koszalin
Blankenfelde	Naugard				(nicht mehr existent)		
Blankenhagen	Regenwalde				Dłusko	Węgorzyno	Łobez
Blankensee	Pyritz				Płotno	Pełczyce	Choszczno
Blankensee	Uecker-münde	Blankensee	Löcknitz-Penkun	Uecker-Randow			
Blankwitt	Flatow				Blękwit	Złotów	Złotów
Blumberg	Greifen-hagen	Casekow	Gartz (Oder)	Uckermark			
Blumberg	Pyritz				Morzyca	Dolice	Stargard
Blumenfelde	Friedeberg				Lubicz	Strzelce Krajeńskie	Strzelce-Drezdenko
Blumenthal	Uecker-münde	Ferdinandshof	Torgelow-Ferdinandshof	Uecker-Randow			
Blumenwerder	Neustettin				Piaseczno	Czaplinek	Drawsko
Bobbin	Rügen	Glowe	Nord-Rügen	Rügen			
Boblin	Uecker-münde				Bobolin	Kołbaskowo	Police
Bochow	Lauenburg				Bochowo	Czarna Dąbrówka	Bytów
Bochowke (1937-45 = Hohenlinde)	Stolp				Bochówko	Czarna Dąbrówka	Bytów
Bodenhagen	Kolberg-Körlin				Bagicz	Ustronie Morskie	Kołobrzeg
Bodstedt	Franzburg-Barth	Fuhlendorf	Barth	Vorpommern-Rügen			
Böbbelin	Schlawe				Bobolin	Gmina Darłowo	Sławno
Böck	Cammin				Buk	Przybiernów	Goleniów
Böck	Flatow				Buka	Debrzno	Człuchów
Böck	Uecker-münde				Buk	Dobra	Police
Bölzig	Schlochau				Bielsko	Koczała	Człuchów
Börnen	Rummels-burg				Darnowo	Kępice	Słupsk
Bogenthin	Kolberg-Körlin				Bogucino	Kołobrzeg	Kołobrzeg
Boissin	Belgard				Byszyno	Białogard	Białogard
Boldekow	Anklam	Boldekow	Anklam-Land	Ost-vorpommern			
Boldevitz	Rügen	Parchtitz	Bergen auf Rügen	Rügen			
Bolkow	Belgard				Bolkowo	Połczyn Zdrój	Świdwin
Boltenhagen	Belgard				Bełtno	Świdwin	Świdwin
Bonin	Regenwalde				Bonin	Łobez	Łobez
Boock	Uecker-münde	Boock	Löcknitz-Penkun	Uecker-Randow			
Borckenfriede	Anklam	Lübs	Am Stettiner Haff	Uecker-Randow			
Borin	Greifen-hagen				Borzym	Gryfino	Gryfino
Borkendorf	Deutsch Krone				Dobrzyca	Wałcz	Wałcz
Borkow	Lauenburg				Borkowo Lęborski	Choczewo	Wejherowo
Born	Dramburg				Borne	Ostrowice	Drawsko
Born	Franzburg-Barth	Born	Darß/Fischland	Vorpommern-Rügen			
Borntin	Greifenberg				Borzęcin	Gryfice	Gryfice
Borntin	Neustettin				Borzęcino	Barwice	Szczecinek
Bornzin	Stolp				Borzęcino	Dębnica Kaszubska	Słupsk
Borrentin	Demmin	Borrentin	Demmin-Land	Demmin			
Bosens	Schlawe				Bożenice	Polanów	Koszalin
Bossin	Usedom-Wollin	Dargen	Usedom-Süd	Ost-vorpommern			
Brackenberg	Stolp				Zagórki	Kobylnica	Słupsk
Brallentin	Pyritz				Bralęcin	Dolice	Stargard
Bramstädt	Belgard				Toporzyk	Połczyn Zdrój	Świdwin
Brand	Friedeberg				Lubiewo	Gmina Drezdenko	Strzelce-Drezdenko
Brandshagen	Grimmen	Brandshagen	Miltzow	Vorpommern-Rügen			
Brandsheide	Friedeberg				Lubiewko	Dobiegniew	Strzelce-Drezdenko
Braunsberg	Naugard				Tucze	Dobra	Łobez
Braunsfelde	Friedeberg				Bronowice	Strzelce Krajeńskie	Strzekce Krajeńskie-Drezdenko
Braunsforth	Saatzig				Bród	Chociwel	Stargard
Brederlow	Pyritz				Przydarłów	Kozielice	Pyrzyce
Breege	Rügen	Breege	Nord-Rügen	Rügen			
Breest	Demmin	Breest	Treptower Tollensewinkel	Demmin			
Breitenberg	Schlawe				Gołogóra	Polanów	Koszalin
Breitenfelde	Naugard				Dobropole	Dobra	Łobez
Breitenfelde	Schlochau				Sierpowo	Czarne	Człuchów
Breitenstein	Deutsch Krone				Dobino	Wałcz	Wałcz
Breitenstein	Friedeberg				Bobrówko	Strzelce Krajeńskie	Strzelce-Drezdenko
Breitenwerder	Friedeberg				Pławin	Stare Kurowo	Strzelce-Drezdenko
Bremerhagen	Grimmen	Wilmshagen	Miltzow	Vorpommern-Rügen			
Brendemühl	Cammin				Jatki	Świerzno	Kamień
Brenkenhofs-bruch	Friedeberg				Błotno	Zwierzyn	Strzelce-Drezdenko
Brenkenhofs-walde	Friedeberg				Błotnica	Stare Kurowo	Strzelce-Drezdenko
Brenkenhofs-walde	Greifen-hagen				Jęczyół	Kobylanka	Stargard
Bresewitz	Franzburg-Barth	Pruchten	Barth	Vorpommern-Rügen			
Bresin	Lauenburg				Brzeźno Łęborskie	Łęczyce	Wejherowo
Bresow	Cammin				Brzozowo	Przybiernów	Goleniów
Bretwisch	Grimmen	Süderholz	(No amt)	Vorpommern-Rügen			
Briesen	Belgard				Brzeżno	Brzeżno	Świdwin
Briesen	Neustettin				Brzeźno	Barwice	Szczecinek
Briesen	Pyritz				Brzezin	Pyrzyce	Pyrzyce
Briesenitz	Deutsch Krone				Brzeźnica	Jastrowie	Złotow
Briesnitz	Schlochau				Brzeźnica	Biały Bór	Szczecinek
Brietzig	Pyritz				Brzesko	Pyrzyce	Pyrzyce
Broitz	Greifenberg				Brojce	Brojce	Gryfice
Brotzen	Deutsch Krone				Broczyno	Czaplinek	Drawsko
Brotzen	Rummels-burg				Broczyna	Trzebielino	Bytów
Bruchhausen	Saatzig				Smogolice	Stargard Szczeciński	Stargard
Brünken	Greifen-hagen				Stare Brynki	Gryfino	Gryfino
Brünnow	Rummels-burg				Bronowo	Kępice	Słupsk
Brüsewitz	Saatzig				Brudzewice	Suchań	Stargard
Brunk	Deutsch Krone				Bronikowo	Mirosławiec	Wałcz
Brunow	Belgard				Bronowo	Połczyn Zdrój	Świdwin
Brusenfelde	Greifen-hagen				Dębogóra	Widuchowa	Gryfino
Brutzen	Belgard				Brusno	Połczyn Zdrój	Świdwin
Buchar	Demmin	Altentreptow	Treptower Tollensewinkel	Demmin			
Buchenstein	Stolp				Bukowa	Smołdzino	Słupsk
Buchholz	Deutsch Krone				Bukowo	Człopa	Wałcz
Buchholz	Franzburg-Barth	Gremersdorf-Buchholz	Franzburg-Richtenberg	Vorpommern-Rügen			
Buchholz	Saatzig				Grabowo	Stargard Szczeciński	Stargard
Buchholz	Schlochau				Bukowo	Człuchów	Człuchów
Buchhorst	Belgard				Żelimucha	Białogard	Białogard
Buchwald	Neustettin				Trzebiechowo	Szczecinek	Szczecinek
Buchwalde	Bütow				Mydlita	Czarna Dąbrówka	Bytów
Buchwerder	Friedeberg				Wełmin	Strzelce Krajeńskie	Strzelce-Drezdenko
Buchwerder	Netzekreis				Bukowiec	Czarnków	Czarnków-Trzcianka
Buckow (bis 1938 = Wendisch Buckow)	Schlawe				Bukowo	Polanów	Koszalin
Buckowin	Lauenburg				Bukowina	Cewice	Lębork
Buddenbrock	Greifen-hagen				Krajnik	Gryfino	Gryfino
Buddendorf	Naugard				Budno	Goleniów	Goleniów
Budow	Stolp				Budowo	Dębnica Kaszubska	Słupsk
Büche	Saatzig				Wiechowo	Marianowo	Stargard
Bünnewitz	Cammin				Buniewice	Kamień Pomorski	Kamień
Büssenthin	Cammin				Buszęcin	Kamień Pomorski	Kamień
Büssow	Friedeberg				Buszów	Strzelce Krajeńskie	Strzelce-Drezdenko
Büssow	Kolberg-Körlin				Byszewo	Siemyśl	Kołobrzeg
Büssow	Schlawe				Boryszewo	Gmina Darłowo	Sławno
Bugewitz	Anklam	Bugewitz	Anklam-Land	Ost-vorpommern			
Bukau (bis 1938 = Deutsch Buckow)	Stolp				Bukówka	Słupsk	Słupsk
Bulgrin	Belgard				Białogórzyno	Białogard	Białogard
Bullenwinkel	Kolberg-Körlin				(nicht mehr existent)		
Buntowo (1939-45 = Seefelde)	Flatow				Buntowo	Złotów	Złotów
Burghof	Neustettin				Radusz	Grzmiąca	Szczecinek
Burow	Demmin	Burow	Treptower Tollensewinkel	Demmin			
Burow	Naugard				Burowo	Goleniów	Goleniów
Burzen	Neustettin				Borucino	Okonek	Złotów
Burzlaff	Belgard				Borzysław	Tychowo	Białogard
Buschdorf	Flatow				Zakrzewo	Zakrzewo	Złotów
Buschen-hagen	Franzburg-Barth	Neu Bartelshagen	Niepars	Vorpommern-Rügen			
Buschvitz	Rügen	Buschvitz	Bergen auf Rügen	Rügen			
Buslar	Belgard				Buślary	Połczyn Zdrój	Świdwin
Bußberg	Arnswalde				Jelenie (nicht auffindbar)		
Bussin	Schlawe				Buszyno	Polanów	Koszalin
Butow	Saatzig				Bytowo	Dobrzany	Stargard
Butzke	Belgard				Buczek	Białogard	Białogard
Bychow	Lauenburg				Bychowo	Gniewino	Wejherowo
Chinow	Lauenburg				Chynowie	Gniewino	Wejherowo
Christfelde	Schlochau				Chrząstowo	Człuchów	Człuchów
Christinenberg	Naugard				Kliniska Wielkie	Goleniów	Goleniów
Christinenhof	Regenwalde				Zdzisławice	Łobez	Łobez
Coccejendorf	Schlawe				Radosław	Sławno	Sławno
Conradsfelde	Flatow				Czyżkówko	Lipka	Złotów
Corda	Netzekreis				Międzylesie	(nicht auffind-bar)	(nicht feststell-bar)
Daarz	Naugard				Darż	Maszewo	Goleniów
Daber	Naugard				Dobra	Dobra	Łobez
Daber	Stolp				Dobra	Dębnica Kaszubska	Słupsk
Daber	Uecker-münde				Dobra	Dobra	Police
Daberkow	Demmin	Daberkow	Jarmen-Tutow	Demmin			
Daberkow	Regenwalde				Dobrkowo	Radowo Małe	Łobez
Dadow	Greifenberg				Dziadowo	Gryfice	Gryfice
Dahlow	Saatzig				Dalewo	Marianowo	Stargard
Dalow	Dramburg				Dalewo	Gmina Drawsko Pomorskie	Drawsko
Damen	Belgard				Stare Dębno	Tychowo	Białogard
Damerau	Schlochau				Dąbrowa Człuchowska	Przechlewo	Człuchów
Damerfitz	Naugard				Dąbrowica	Maszewo	Goleniów
Damerkow	Bütow				Dąbrówka	Borzy-tuchom	Bytów
Damerkow	Stolp				Dąbrówka	Damnica	Słupsk
Damerow	Belgard				Dąbrowa Białogardzka	Rąbino	Świdwin
Damerow	Naugard				Dąbrowa Nowogardzka	Nowogard	Goleniów
Damerow	Schlawe				Dąbrowa	Sianów	Koszalin
Damgardt	Kolberg-Körlin				Dębogard	Dygowo	Kołobrzeg
Damitz	Kolberg-Körlin				Dębica	Rymań	Kołobrzeg
Damitzow	Greifen-hagen	Tantow	Gartz (Oder)	Uckermark			
Dammen	Stolp				Damno	Damnica	Słupsk
Dammlang	Deutsch Krone				Dębołęka	Wałcz	Wałcz
Damnitz	Pyritz				Dębica	Warnice	Pyrzyce
Damnitz	Schlochau				Dębnica	Człuchów	Człuchów
Dampen	Bütow				Dąbie	Bytów	Bytów
Damsdorf	Bütow				Niezaby-szewo	Bytów	Bytów
Damshagen	Schlawe				Domasławice	Gmina Darłowo	Sławno
Dannenberg	Usedom-Wollin				Domysłów	Wolin	Kamień
Dargebanz	Usedom-Wollin				Dargobądz	Wolin	Kamień
Dargen	Köslin				Dargiń	Gmina Bobolice	Koszalin
Dargen	Usedom-Wollin	Dargen	Usedom-Süd	Ost-vorpommern			
Dargeröse	Stolp				Dargoleza	Główczyce	Słupsk
Dargislaff	Greifenberg				Dargosław	Brojce	Gryfice
Dargitz	Uecker-münde	Schönwalde	Uecker-Randow-Tal	Uecker-Randow			
Dargsow	Cammin				Dargoszewo	Golczewo	Kamień
Darkow	Belgard				Dargikowo	Białogard	Białogard
Darsekow	Rummels-burg				Darżkowo	Kołczygłowy	Bytów
Darsen	Schlochau				Dźwierzno	Koczała	Człuchów
Darsewitz	Usedom-Wollin				Darzowice	Wolin	Kamień
Darsin	Stolp				Darżyno	Potęgowo	Słupsk
Darsow	Greifenberg				Darżewo	Brojce	Gryfice
Darsow	Stolp				Darżewo	Nowa Wieś Lęborska	Lębork
Daskow	Franzburg-Barth	Ahrenshagen-Daskow	Ribnitz-Damgarten	Vorpommern-Rügen			
Dassow	Kolberg-Körlin				Daszewo	Karlino	Białogard
Datjow	Köslin				Tatów	Biesiekierz	Koszalin
Deep (Treptower Deep)	Greifenberg				Mrzeżyno	Trzebiatów	Gryfice
Deep	Köslin				Czajcze	Mielno	Koszalin
Degendorf	Lauenburg				Charbrowo	Wicko	Lębork
Degow	Kolberg-Körlin				Dygowo	Dygowo	Kołobrzeg
Demmin	Schlochau				Dyminek	Biały Bór	Szczecinek
Denzig	Dramburg				Dębsko	Kalisz Pomorski	Drawsko
Denzin	Belgard				Dębczyno	Białogard	Białogard
Deuthin	Cammin				Ducino	Kamień Pomorski	Kamień
Deutsch Briesen	Schlochau				Brzeźno	Człuchów	Człuchów
Deutsch Buckow (nach 1938 = Bukau)	Stolp				Bukówka	Słupsk	Słupsk
Deutsch Czarnikau (1940-45 = Scharnikau)	Netzekreis				Czarnków	Czarnków	Czarnków-Trzcianka
Deutsch Fier	Flatow				Piecewo	Tarnówka	Złotów
Deutsch Fuhlbeck	Dramburg				Wielboki	Wierzchowo	Drawsko
Deutsch Karstnitz (1937-45 = Karstnitz)	Stolp				Karżnica	Damnica	Słupsk
Deutsch Pribbernow	Greifenberg				Przybier-nówko	Gryfice	Gryfice
Deutsch Puddiger	Schlawe				Podgórki	Malechowo	Sławno
Deutschrode	Schlawe				Tokary	Sławno	Sławno
Deutsch Usch (1937-45 = Usch (Netzekreis))	Netzekreis				Ujście	Ujście	Piła
Deyelsdorf	Grimmen	Deyelsdorf	Recknitz-Trebeltal	Vorpommern-Rügen			
Dickhof	Schlochau				Dzików	Rzeczenica	Człuchów
Diebelbruch	Arnswalde				Jaglisko	Bierzwnik	Choszczno
Dieck	Neustettin				Dziki	Szczecinek	Szczecinek
Diedrichs-dorf	Naugard				Bolechowo	Goleniów	Goleniów
Dietersdorf	Dramburg				Bobrowo	Złocieniec	Drawsko
Dievenow	Cammin				Dziwnów	Dziwnów	Kamień
Diwitz	Franzburg-Barth	Divitz-Spoldershagen	Barth	Vorpommern-Rügen			
Dingelsberg	Saatzig				Orzechowo	Ińsko	Stargard
Dischen-hagen	Cammin				Dzisna	Przybiernów	Goleniów
Dobberpfuhl	Cammin				Dobropole	Wolin	Kamień
Dobberpfuhl	Greifen-hagen				Dobropole Gryfińskie	Stare Czarnowo	Gryfino
Dobberpfuhl	Pyritz				Dobropole Pyrzyckie	Dolice	Stargard Szeczeciński
Dobrin	Flatow				Debrzno Wieś	Lipka	Złotów
Doderlage	Deutsch Krone				(nicht mehr existent)		
Döbel	Belgard				Doble	Tychowo	Białogard
Dölitz	Pyritz				Dolice	Dolice	Stargard
Dörings-hagen	Naugard				Wołowiec	Nowogard	Goleniów
Dörsenthin	Köslin				Koszalin-Dzierżęcino	Koszalin	(Stadtkreis)
Dörsenthin	Schlawe				Dzierżęcin	Postomino	Sławno
Dohnafelde	Belgard				Donatowo	Ostrowice	Drawsko
Dolfusbruch	Deutsch Krone				Przyłęg	Trzcianka	Czarnków-Trzcianka
Dolgen	Dramburg				Dołgie	Ostrowice	Drawsko
Dolgen	Friedeberg				Długie	Strzelce Krajeńskie	Strzelce-Drezdenko
Dolgen	Neustettin				Dołgie	Biały Bór	Szczecinek
Domslaff	Schlochau				Domisław	Czarne	Człuchów
Dorotheen-hof	Naugard				Anielino	Dobra	Łobez
Dorotheen-thal	Regenwalde				Sarnikierz	Węgorzyno	Łobez
Dorotheen-walde	Uecker-münde	Rothenklem-penow	Löcknitz-Penkun	Uecker-Randow			
Dorow	Regenwalde				Dorowo	Resko	Łobez
Dorphagen	Cammin				Mechowo	Golczewo	Kamień
Dragebruch	Friedeberg				Drawiny	Gmina Drezdenko	Strzelce-Drezdenko
Dragefeld	Netzekreis				Stefanowo	(nicht auffindbar)	(nicht feststellbar)
Drahnow	Deutsch Krone				Drzonowo Wałeckie	Człopa	Wałcz
Dranske	Rügen	Dranske	Nord-Rügen	Rügen			
Drawehn	Köslin				Drzewiany	Gmina Bobolice	Koszalin
Drechow	Franzburg-Barth	Drechow	Recknitz-Trebeltal	Vorpommern-Rügen			
Drenow	Belgard				Drzonowo Białogardzkie	Tychowo	Białogard
Drenow	Kolberg-Körlin				Drzonowo	Kołobrzeg	Kołobrzeg
Drensch	Neustettin				Drężno	Szczecinek	Szczecinek
Drenzig	Schlawe				Drzeńsko	Malechowo	Sławno
Dreschvitz	Rügen	Dreschvitz	West-Rügen	Rügen			
Dresow	Greifenberg				Drzeżewo	Rewal	Gryfice
Dresow	Stolp				Drzeżewo	Główczyce	Słupsk
Drewitz	Cammin				Drewica	Golczewo	Kamień
Drosedow	Kolberg-Körlin				Drozdowo	Rymań	Kołobrzeg
Dubberow	Belgard				Dobrowo	Tychowo	Białogard
Dubbertech	Köslin				Dobrociechy	Gmina Bobolice	Koszalin
Dubnitz	Rügen	Sassnitz	(amtsfrei)	Rügen			
Ducherow	Anklam	Ducherow	Anklam-Land	Ost-vorpommern			
Dübzow	Regenwalde				Dobieszewo	Łobez	Łobez
Dünnow	Stolp				Duninowo	Ustka	Słupsk
Dünow	Cammin				Duniewo	Świerzno	Kamień
Düssin	Cammin				Dusin	Kamień Pomorski	Kamień
Düsterbeck	Naugard				Orzechowo	Nowogard	Goleniów
Düvier	Grimmen	Düvier	Peenetal/Loitz	Demmin			
Dulzig	Rummels-burg				Dolsko	Miastko	Bytów
Dummadel	Greifenberg				Tąpadły	Brojce	Gryfice
Dummerfitz	Neustettin				Dąbrowica	Borne Sulinowo	Szczecinek
Dumröse	Stolp				Domaradz	Damnica	Słupsk
Dyck	Deutsch Krone				Dzikowo	Wałcz	Wałcz
Eberstein	Naugard				Wojcieszyn	Nowogard	Goleniów
Eckarts-berge	Deutsch Krone				Kolno	Wałcz	Wałcz
Eggesin	Uecker-münde	Eggesin	Am Stettiner Haff	Uecker-Randow			
Eichberg	Netzekreis				Dębogóra	Wieleń	Czarnków-Trzcianka
Eichels-hagen	Pyritz				Trzebórz	Kozielice	Pyrzyce
Eichenberg	Dramburg				Dębniewice	Wierzchowo	Drawsko
Eichen-berge	Neustettin				Dąbie	Borne Sulinowo	Szczecinek
Eichenfelde (bis 1937 = Seeligsfelde)	Belgard				Szeligowo	Połczyn Zdrój	Świdwin
Eichen-walde	Naugard				Dębice	Maszewo	Goleniów
Eichfier	Deutsch Krone				Wołowe Lasy	Człopa	Wałcz
Eichhof	Uecker-münde	Wilhelms-burg	Torgelow-Ferdinandshof	Uecker-Randow			
Eichkamp (bis 1937 = Gissolk)	Neustettin				Jeziorki	Barwice	Szczecinek
Eickfier	Schlochau				Brzezie	Rzeczenica	Człuchów
Eickstedts-walde	Kolberg-Körlin				Dargocice	Gościno	Kołobrzeg
Eiersberg	Greifenberg				Skalno	Karnice	Gryfice
Eisenbrück	Schlochau				Żołna	Przechlewo	Człuchów
Eisen-hammer	Schlochau				Rudniki	Przechlewo	Człuchów
Eixen	Franzburg-Barth	Eixen	Recknitz-Trebeltal	Vorpommern-Rügen			
Elmenhorst	Grimmen	Elmenhorst	Miltzow	Vorpommern-Rügen			
Elsenau	Schlochau				Olszanowo	Rzeczenica	Człuchów
Elvershagen	Regenwalde				Łagiewniki	Resko	Łobez
Erbens-wunsch	Friedeberg				Moczydła	Drawsko	Czarnów-Trzcianka
Eschbruch	Friedeberg				Rąpin	Gmina Drezdenko	Strzelce-Drezdenko
Eschenriege	Neustettin				Przeradz	Grzmiąca	Szczecinek
Espenhagen	Flatow				Ósówka	Tarnówka	Złotów
Eugenien-berg	Demmin	Sieden-brünzow	Demmin-Land	Demmin			
Eulenburg	Neustettin				Silnowo	Borne Sulinowo	Szczecinek
Eventin	Schlawe				Iwięcino	Sianów	Koszalin
Falkenberg	Naugard				Sokolniki	Maszewo	Goleniów
Falkenberg	Pyritz				Brzezina	Dolice	Stargard
Falkenhagen	Rummels-burg				Miłocice	Miastko	Bytów
Falkenwalde	Saatzig				Sokoliniec	Recz	Choszczno
Falkenwalde	Schlochau				Sokole	Czarne	Człuchów
Falkenwalde	Uecker-münde				Tanowo	Police	Police
Fanger	Naugard				Węgorza	Osina	Goleniów
Farbezin	Naugard				Wierzbięcin	Nowogard	Goleniów
Ferdinandshof	Uecker-münde	Ferdinands-hof	Torgelow-Ferdinandshof	Uecker-Randow			
Ferdinand-stein	Greifen-hagen				Daleszewo	Gryfino	Gryfino
Fernheide	Schlochau				Bielica	Biały Bór	Szczecinek
Fier	Regenwalde				Wytok	Płoty	Gryfice
Filehne	Netzekreis				Wieleń	Wieleń	Czarnków-Trzcianka
Firchau	Schlochau				Wierzchowo	Człuchów	Człuchów
Fissahn	Netzekreis				Wizany	Krzyż Wielkopolski	Czarnków-Trzcianka
Flackenheide	Neustettin				Wielawino	Grzmiąca	Szczecinek
Flacksee	Neustettin				Jeziorna	Borne Sulinowo	Szczecinek
Flathe	Deutsch Krone				Złotowo	Tuczno	Wałcz
Flederborn	Neustettin				Podgaje	Okonek	Złotów
Flinkow	Stolp				Włynkowo	Słupsk	Słupsk
Flötenstein	Schlochau				Koczała	Koczała	Człuchów
Floth	Netzekreis				Radolinek	Czarnków	Czarnków-Trzcianka
Förstenau	Schlochau				Gwiedździn	Rzeczenica	Człuchów
Follstein	Netzekreis				Folsztyn	Wieleń	Czarnków-Trzcianka
Fouquettin	Demmin	Wildberg	Treptower Tollensewinkel	Demmin			
Frätow	Grimmen	Meseken-hagen	Landhagen	Ost-vorpommern			
Franzdorf	Rummels-burg				Witanowo	Kołczygłowy	Bytów
Franzen	Schlawe				Wrząca	Kobylnica	Sławno
Franzfelde	Naugard				Przypólsko	Osina	Goleniów
Franzthal	Friedeberg				Głęboczek	Stare Kurowo	Strzelce-Drezdenko
Franzwalde	Bütow				Piaszno	Tuchomie	Bytów
Fratzig	Netzekreis				Wrząca	Trzcianka	Czarnków-Trzcianka
Freetz	Schlawe				Wrześnica	Sławno	Sławno
Freiheide	Naugard				Godowo	Maszewo	Goleniów
Freist	Lauenburg				Wrzeście	Wicko	Lębork
Freist	Stolp				Wrzeście	Słupsk	Słupsk
Freudenfier	Deutsch Krone				Szwecja	Wałcz	Wałcz
Friedebergsch-bruch	Friedeberg				Żółwin	Zwierzyn	Strzelce-Drezdenko
Friedenau	Arnswalde				Konotop	Drawno	Choszczno
Friedensdorf	Schlawe				Powidz	Polanów	Koszalin
Friedrichsberg	Naugard				Błotno	Nowogard	Goleniów
Friedrichsdorf	Dramburg				Darskowo	Złocieniec	Drawsko
Friedrichsdorf	Friedeberg				Przeborowo	Gmina Drezdenko	Strzelce-Drezdenko
Friedrichsdorf	Naugard				(nicht mehr existent)		
Friedrichsfelde	Saatzig				Wierzchucice	Ińsko	Stargard
Friedrichs-gnade	Regenwalde				Troszczyno	Radowo Małe	Łobez
Friedrichs-hagen	Uecker-münde	Wilhelms-burg	Torgelow-Ferdinandshof	Uecker-Randow			
Friedrichshof	Pyritz				Skrzany	Dolice	Stargard
Friedrichshorst	Dramburg				Otrzep	Wierzchowo	Drawsko
Friedrichshuld	Rummels-burg				Bożanka	Trzebielino	Bytów
Friedrichssee	Bütow				Łąkie	Studzienice	Bytów
Friedrichsthal	Greifen-hagen	Gartz (Oder)	Gartz (Oder)	Uckermark			
Friedrichsthal	Pyritz				Okunica	Pyrzyce	Pyrzyce
Fritzow	Kolberg-Körlin				Wrzosowo	Dygowo	Kołobrzeg
Fürstenau	Arnswalde				Barnimie	Drawno	Choszczno
Fürstenflagge	Naugard				Bolesławice	Goleniów	Goleniów
Fürstensee	Pyritz				Przywodzie	Goleniów	Goleniów
Fuhlendorf	Franzburg-Barth	Fuhlendorf	Barth	Vorpommern-Rügen			
Funkenhagen	Köslin				Gąski	Mielno	Koszalin
Gabbert	Saatzig				Jaworce	Kalisz Pomorski	Drawsko
Gadgen	Rummels-burg				Gatka	Miastko	Bytów
Gaffert	Stolp				Jawory	Dębnica Kaszubska	Słupsk
Gager	Rügen	Gager	Mönchgut-Granitz	Rügen			
Gallensow	Stolp				Gałęzów	Dębnica Kaszubska	Słupsk
Galow	Neustettin				Gałowo	Szczecinek	Szczecinek
Gambin	Stolp				Gąbino	Ustka	Słupsk
Gandelin	Kolberg-Körlin				Kędrzyno	Siemyśl	Kołobrzeg
Gans	Lauenburg				Gęś	Wicko	Lębork
Ganschendorf	Demmin	Sarow	Demmin-Land	Demmin			
Ganserin	Cammin				Gąsierzyno	Stepnica	Goleniów
Ganzkow	Kolberg-Körlin				Gąskowo	Dygowo	Kołobrzeg
Garchen	Kolberg-Körlin				Garnki	Karlino	Białogard
Garden	Greifen-hagen				Gardno	Gryfino	Gryfino
Gardin	Regenwalde				Gardzin	Resko	Łobez
Garrin	Kolberg-Körlin				Charzyno	Siemyśl	Kołobrzeg
Garz	Usedom-Wollin	Garz	Usedom-Süd	Ost-vorpommern			
Garzigar	Lauenburg				Garczegorze	Nowa Wieś Lęborska	Lębork
Gatschow	Demmin	Beggerow	Demmin-Land	Demmin			
Gatz	Stolp				Gać	Słupsk	Słupsk
Gauerkow	Belgard				Gaworkowo	Połczyn Zdrój	Świdwin
Gaulitz	Cammin				Gogolice	Wolin	Kamień
Gebersdorf	Greifen-hagen				Sosnowo	Banie	Gryfino
Geesow	Greifen-hagen	Gartz (Oder)	Gartz (Oder)	Uckermark			
Gegensee	Uecker-münde	Ahlbeck	Am Stettiner Haff	Uecker-Randow			
Geglenfelde	Schlochau				Wyczechy	Czarne	Człuchów
Geiglitz	Regenwalde				Iglice	Resko	Łobez
Geilenfelde	Friedeberg				Gilów	Strzelce Krajeńskie	Strzelce-Drezdenko
Gellen	Neustettin				Jeleń	Borne Sulinowo	Szczecinek
Gellenthin	Usedom-Wollin	Usedom	Usedom-Süd	Ost-vorpommern			
Gellin	Neustettin				Jelenino	Szczecinek	Szczecinek
Georgendorf	Rummels-burg				Lubkowo	Miastko	Bytów
Gerbin	Schlawe				Garbno	Polanów	Koszalin
Gerdshagen	Regenwalde				Gardno	Węgorzyno	Łobez
Gerfin	Köslin				Górawino	Gmina Bobolice	Koszalin
Gerhardshöhe	Lauenburg				Karwica	Cewice	Lębork
Gersdorf	Bütow				Ząbinowice	Bytów	Bytów
Gersdorf	Dramburg				Gawroniec	Połczyn Zdrój	Świdwin
Gervin	Kolberg-Körlin				Gorawino	Rymań	Kołobrzeg
Gewiesen	Rummels-burg				Kwisno	Miastko	Bytów
Gienow	Regenwalde				Ginawa	Węgorzyno	Łobez
Giesebitz	Stolp				Izbica	Główczyce	Słupsk
Giesen	Dramburg				Giżyno	Kalisz Pomorski	Drawsko
Giesenthal-Raumersaue	Pyritz				Giżyn	Pyrzyce	Pyrzyce
Gieskow	Cammin				Giżkowo	Kamień Pomorski	Kamień
Gieskow	Köslin				Giezkowo	Świeszyno	Koszalin
Gingst	Rügen	Gingst	West-Rügen	Rügen			
Gissolk (1938-45 = Eichkamp)	Neustettin				Jeziorki	Barwice	Szczecinek
Glambeck	Arnswalde				Głębokie	Kalisz Pomorski	Drawsko
Glansee	Greifenberg				Gołańcz Pomorska	Trzebiatów	Gryfice
Glasenapp	Neustettin				Godzisław	Grzmiąca	Szczecinek
Glashütte	Netzekreis				Huta Szklana	Krzyż Wielkopolski	Czarnków-Trzcianka
Glashütte	Uecker-münde	Rothen-klempenow	Löcknitz-Penkun	Uecker-Randow			
Glasow	Greifen-hagen	Glasow	Löcknitz-Penkun	Uecker-Randow			
Glendelin	Demmin	Beggerow	Demmin-Land	Demmin			
Glewitz	Grimmen	Glewitz	Franzburg-Richtenberg	Vorpommern-Rügen			
Glewitz	Naugard				Glewice	Goleniów	Goléniów
Glietzig	Naugard				Glicko	Nowogard	Goleniów
Glietzig	Regenwalde				Klępnica	Łobez	Łobez
Gloddow	Rummels-burg				Głodowo	Miastko	Bytów
Glötzin	Belgard				Głodzino	Rąbino	Białogard
Glowitz	Stolp				Główczyce	Główczyce	Słupsk
Gneventhin	Usedom-Wollin	Usedom	Usedom-Süd	Ost-vorpommern			
Gnevkow	Demmin	Gnevkow	Treptower Tollensewinkel	Demmin			
Gnevzow (Gnevezow)	Demmin	Borrentin	Demmin-Land	Demmin			
Gnewin	Lauenburg				Gniewino	Gniewino	Wejherowo
Goddentow	Lauenburg				Godętowo	Łęczyce	Wejherowo
Göhren	Arnswalde				Górzno	Bierzwnik	Choszczno
Göhren	Rügen	Göhren	Mönchgut-Granitz	Rügen			
Göritz	Schlawe				Gorzyca	Malechowo	Sławno
Görke	Cammin				Górki	Kamień Pomorski	Kamień
Görke	Greifenberg				Górzyca	Gryfice	Gryfice
Görke	Usedom-Wollin	Dargen	Usedom-Süd	Ost-vorpommern			
Görmin	Grimmen	Görmin	Peenetal/Loitz	Demmin			
Görshagen	Schlawe				Górsko	Postomino	Sławno
Gohrband	Köslin				Gorzebądz	Sianów	Koszalin
Gohren	Stolp				Górzyno	Główczyce	Słupsk
Golchen	Demmin	Golchen	Treptower Tollensewinkel	Demmin			
Goldbeck	Köslin				Głodowa	Gmina Bobolice	Koszalin
Goldbeck	Saatzig				Sulino	Marianowo	Stargard
Gollendorf	Köslin				Chełmoniewo	Koszalin	(Stadtkreis)
Gollin	Deutsch Krone				Golin	Człopa	Wałcz
Gollnows-hagen	Naugard				Białuń	Goleniów	Goleniów
Golz	Dramburg				Woliczno	Gmina Drawsko Pomorskie	Drawsko
Gorkow	Uecker-münde	Löcknitz	Löcknitz-Penkun	Uecker-Randow			
Gornitz	Netzekreis				Górnica	Trzcianka	Czarnków-Trzcianka
Gornow	Greifen-hagen				Górnowo	Banie	Gryfino
Gotendorf	Lauenburg				Choczewo	Choczewo	Wejherowo
Gothen	Usedom-Wollin	Heringsdorf	(amtsfrei)	Ost-vorpommern			
Gottberg	Pyritz				Boguszyny	Pełczyce	Choszczosno
Gottschlimm	Friedeberg				Gościm	Gmina Drezdenko	Strzelce-Drezdenko
Gottschlim-merbruch	Friedeberg				Gościmiec	Zwierzyn	Strzelce-Drezdenko
Grabau	Schlochau				Grabowo	Biały Bór	Szczecinek
Graben	Neustettin				Grabno	Borne Sulinowo	Szczecinek
Grabow	Cammin				Grabowo	Kamień Pomorski	Kamień
Grabunz	Neustettin				Stary Grabiąż	Barwice	Szczecinek
Gräbnitzfelde	Saatzig				Grabnica	Dobrzany	Stargard
Gräfenbrück	Naugard				Zatocze	Nowogard	Goleniów
Gräwenhagen	Naugard				Grabin	Nowogard	Goleniów
Gramatten-brück	Deutsch Krone				Zabrodzie	Szydłowo	Piła
Grambin	Uecker-münde	Grambin	Am Stettiner Haff	Uecker-Randow			
Grambow	Cammin				Grębowo	Kamień Pomorski	Kamień
Grambow	Uecker-münde	Grambow	Löcknitz-Penkun	Uecker-Randow			
Gramenz	Bütow				Grzmiąca	Bytów	Bytów
Gramenz	Neustettin				Grzmiąca	Grzmiąca	Szczecinek
Grammendorf	Grimmen	Grammen-dorf	Recknitz-Trebeltal	Vorpommern-Rügen			
Grammentin	Demmin	Grammen-tin	Stavenhagen	Demmin			
Grandshagen	Greifenberg				Grądy	Gryfice	Gryfice
Granitz	Rügen	Lancken-Granitz	Mönchgut-Granitz	Rügen			
Granow	Arnswalde				Granowo	Krzęcin	Choszczno
Gransebieth	Grimmen	Gransebieth	Recknitz-Trebeltal	Vorpommern-Rügen			
Granzin	Stolp				Grąsino	Słupsk	Słupsk
Granzow	Cammin				Chrząstowo	Kamień Pomorski	Kamień
Grapitz	Stolp				Grapice	Potęgowo	Słupsk
Grapow	Friedeberg				Chrapów	Dobiegniew	Strzelce-Drezdenko
Grapzow	Demmin	Grapzow	Treptower Tollensewinkel	Demmin			
Grassee	Saatzig				Studnica	Ińsko	Stargard
Gremersdorf	Grimmen	Gremers-dorf-Buchholz	Franzburg-Richtenberg	Vorpommern-Rügen			
Grenzin	Franzburg-Barth	Gremers-dorf-Buchholz	Franzburg-Richtenberg	Vorpommern-Rügen			
Grenzneuhof	Neustettin				Łysinin	Czaplinek	Drawsko
Gresonse	Flatow				Stare Dzierzążno	Złotów	Złotów
Gribow	Kolberg-Körlin				Grzybowo	Kołobrzeg	Kołobrzeg
Griebenow	Grimmen	Süderholz	(amtsfrei)	Vorpommern-Rügen			
Grischow	Demmin	Grischow	Treptower Tollensewinkel	Demmin			
Gristow	Cammin				Chrząsz-czewo	Kamień Pomorski	Kamień
Gristow	Grimmen	Meseken-hagen	Landhagen	Ost-vorpommern			
Gröbenzin	Bütow				Rabacino	Studzienice	Bytów
Grössin	Belgard				Krosino	Świdwin	Świdwin
Groß Below	Demmin	Bartow	Treptower Tollensewinkel	Demmin			
Groß Benz	Naugard				Bienice	Dobra	Łobez
Groß Bisdorf	Grimmen	Süderholz	(amtsfrei)	Vorpommern-Rügen			
Groß Borcken-hagen	Regenwalde				Borkowo Wielkie	Radowo Małe	Łobez
Groß Born	Neustettin				Borne Sulinowo	Borne Sulinowo	Szczecinek
Groß Boschpol	Lauenburg				Bożepole Wielkie	Łęczyce	Wejherowo
Groß Brüskow	Stolp				Bruskowo Wielkie	Słupsk	Słupsk
Groß Butzig	Flatow				Wielki Buczek	Lipka	Złotów
Groß Dallenthin	Neustettin				Dalęcino	Szczecinek	Szczecinek
Groß Damerkow	Lauenburg				Dąbrówka Wielka	Łęczyce	Wejherowo
Groß Drensen	Netzekreis				Dzierżążno Wielkie	Wieleń	Czarnków-Trzcianka
Groß Dübsow	Stolp				Dobieszewo	Dębnica Kaszubska	Słupski
Großendorf	Stolp				Wielka Wieś	Główczyce	Słupsk
Großenhagen	Naugard				Tarnowo	Maszewo	Goleniów
Groß Friedrichs-berg	Flatow				Drożyska Wielkie	Zakrzewo	Złotów
Groß Gansen	Stolp				Gałąźnia Wielka	Kołczygłowy	Bytów
Groß Garde	Stolp				Gardna Wielka	Smołdzino	Słupsk
Groß Gluschen	Stolp				Głuszyno	Potęgowo	Słupsk
Groß Grünow	Dramburg				Gronowo	Ostrowice	Drawsko
Groß Hertzberg	Neustettin				Lubnica	Okonek	Złotów
Groß Jannewitz	Lauenburg				Janowice	Nowa Wieś Lęborska	Lębork
Groß Jenznick	Schlochau				Jęczniki Wielki	Człuchów	Człuchów
Groß Jestin	Kolberg-Körlin				Gościno	Gościno	Kołobrzeg
Groß Justin	Cammin				Gostyń	Świerzno	Kamień
Groß Karzenburg	Rummels-burg				Sępolno Wielkie	Biały Bór	Szczecinek
Groß Kordshagen	Franzburg-Barth	Groß Kordshagen	Niepars	Vorpommern-Rügen			
Groß Kotten	Netzekreis				Kocień Wielki	Wieleń	Czarnków-Trzcianka
Groß Krössin	Neustettin				Krosino	Grzmiąca	Szczecinek
Groß Kubitz	Rügen	Ummanz	West-Rügen	Rügen			
Groß Küdde	Neustettin				Gwda Wielka	Szczecinek	Szczecinek
Groß Latzkow	Pyritz				Laskowo	Przelewice	Pyrzyce
Groß Leistikow	Naugard				Lestkowo	Nowogard	Goleniów
Groß Linichen	Dramburg				Świerczyno	Wierzchowo	Drawsko
Groß Lubs	Netzekreis				Lubcz Wielki	Krzyż Wielkopolski	Czarnków-Trzcianka
Groß Machmin	Stolp				Machowino	Ustka	Słupsk
Groß Massow	Lauenburg				Maszewo Lęborskie	Cewice	Lębork
Groß Massowitz	Bütow				Masłowice Tuchomskie	Tuchomie	Bytów
Groß Mellen	Saatzig				(nicht mehr existent)		
Groß Möllen (Großmöllen)	Köslin				Mielno	Mielno	Koszalin
Groß Möllen	Pyritz				Mielno Pyrzycki	Kozielice	Pyrzyce
Groß Mohrdorf	Franzburg-Barth	Groß Mohrdorf	Altenpleen	Vorpommern-Rügen			
Groß Mokratz	Usedom-Wollin				Mokrzyca Wielka	Wolin	Kamień
Groß Nossin	Stolp				Nożyno	Czarna Dąbrówka	Bytów
Groß Panknin	Belgard				Pękanino	Białogard	Białogard
Groß Peterkau	Schlochau				Pietrzykowo	Koczała	Człuchów
Groß Podel	Stolp				Podole Wielkie	Główczyce	Słupsk
Groß Pomeiske	Bütow				Pomysk Wielki	Bytów	Bytów
Groß Raddow	Regenwalde				Radowo Wielkie	Radowo Małe	Łobez
Groß Rakitt	Stolp				Rokity	Czarna Dąbrówka	Bytów
Groß Rambin	Belgard				Rąbino	Rąbino	Świdin
Groß Rischow	Pyritz				Ryszewo	Pyrzyce	Pyrzyce
Groß Runow	Stolp				Runowo	Potęgowo	Słupsk
Groß Sabin	Dramburg				Żabin	Wierzchowo	Drawsko
Groß Sabow	Naugard				Żabowo	Nowogard	Goleniów
Groß Satspe	Belgard				Zaspy Wielkie	Tychowo	Białogard
Groß Schlatikow	Saatzig				Słodkowo	Suchań	Stargard
Groß Schlönwitz	Stolp				Słonowice	Kobylnica	Słupsk
Groß Schönfeld	Greifen-hagen				Żarczyn	Widuchowa	Gryfino
Groß Schönfeld	Pyritz				Obryta	Warnice	Pyrzyce
Groß Schoritz	Rügen	Garz/Rügen	Bergen auf Rügen	Rügen			
Groß Schwarzsee	Neustettin				Czarne Wielkie	Czaplinek	Drawsko
Groß Schwichow	Lauenburg				Świchowo	Łęczyce	Wejherowo
Groß Schwirsen	Rummels-burg				Świerzno	Miastko	Bytów
Groß Silber	Saatzig				Sulibórz	Recz	Choszczno
Groß Silkow	Stolp				Żelki	Kobylnica	Słupsk
Groß Spiegel	Dramburg				Poźrzadło Wielkie	Kalisz Pomorski	Drawsko
Groß Strellin	Stolp				Strzelino	Słupsk	Słupsk
Groß Teetzleben	Demmin	Groß Teetzleben	Treptower Tollensewinkel	Demmin			
Groß Toitin	Demmin	Jarmen	Jarmen-Tutow	Demmin			
Groß Tuchen	Bütow				Tuchomie	Tuchomie	Bytów
Groß Tychow	Belgard				Tychowo	Tychowo	Białogard
Groß Volz	Rummels-burg				Wołcza Wielka	Miastko	Bytów
Groß Wachlin	Naugard				Warchlino	Stargard Szczeciński	Stargard
Groß Wittenberg	Deutsch Krone				Szydłowo	Szydłowo	Piła
Groß Wittfelde	Schlochau				Biała	Biały Bór	Szczecinek
Groß Zacharin	Deutsch Krone				Starowice	Borne Sulinowo	Szczecinek
Groß Zapplin	Greifenberg				Czaplin Wielki	Karnice	Gryfice
Groß Zarnewanz	Grimmen	Süderholz	(amtsfrei)	Vorpommern-Rügen			
Groß Zarnow	Pyritz				Czarnowo	Kozielice	Pyrzyce
Groß Zemmin	Neustettin				Ciemino	Borne Sulinowo	Szczecinek
Groß Zicker	Rügen	Groß Zicker	Mönchgut-Granitz	Rügen			
Gruel	Franzburg-Barth	Ahrens-hagen-Daskow	Ribnitz-Damgarten	Vorpommern-Rügen			
Grünberg	Dramburg				Rzęśnica	Złocieniec	Drawsko
Grünenwalde	Bütow				Łupawsko	Czarna Dąbrówka	Bytów
Grünewald	Neustettin				Mieszałki	Grzmiąca	Szczecinek
Grünfier	Netzekreis				Zielonowo	Wieleń	Czarnków-Trzcianka
Grünhagen	Stolp				Wierzbięcin	Słupsk	Słupsk
Grün Kordshagen	Franzburg-Barth	Jakobsdorf	Niepars	Vorpommern-Rügen			
Grünwalde-Saaben	Rummels-burg				Role-Żabno	Miastko	Bytów
Grünz	Greifen-hagen	Penkun	Löcknitz-Penkun	Uecker-Randow			
Grüssow	Belgard				Gruszewo	Białogard	Białogard
Grüssow	Usedom-Wollin	Rankwitz	Usedom-Süd	Ost-vorpommern			
Grumsdorf	Neustettin				Grąbczyn	Szczecinek	Szczecinek
Grunau	Flatow				Stare Gronowo	Debrzno	Człuchów
Grupenhagen	Schlawe				Krupy	Gmina Darłowo	Sławno
Güdenhagen	Köslin				Mścice	Będzino	Koszalin
Gültz	Demmin	Gültz	Treptower Tollensewinkel	Demmin			
Gülzow	Cammin				Golczewo	Golczewo	Kamień
Günnitz	Uecker-münde				Gunice	Police	Police
Güntersberg	Saatzig				Nosowo	Suchań	Stargard
Günters-hagen	Dramburg				Lubieszewo	Złocieniec	Drawsko
Günz	Franzburg-Barth	Altenpleen	Altenpleen	Vorpommern-Rügen			
Gützelfitz	Greifenberg				Gocławice	Karnice	Gryfice
Gützlaffs-hagen	Greifenberg				Gosław	Trzebiatów	Gryfice
Gumbin	Stolp				Głobino	Słupsk	Słupsk
Gumenz	Rummels-burg				Gumieniec	Trzebielino	Bytów
Gummin	Greifenberg				Gąbin	Trzebiatów	Gryfice
Gumminshof	Greifenberg				Mirosławice	Trzebiatów	Gryfice
Gummlin	Usedom-Wollin	Stolpe	Usedom-Süd	Ost-vorpommern			
Gumnitz	Uecker-münde	Eggesin	Am Stettiner Haff	Uecker-Randow			
Gumtow	Belgard				Chomętowo	Brzeżno	Świdwin
Gumtow	Greifenberg				Chomętowo	Trzebiatów	Gryfice
Gurkow	Friedeberg				Górki Noteckie	Zwierzyn	Strzelce-Drezdenko
Gursen	Flatow				Górzna	Złotów	Złótów
Guscht	Friedeberg				Goszcza-nowo	Gmina Drezdenko	Strzelce-Drezdenko
Guschter-bruch	Friedeberg				Goszcza-nówko	Gmina Drezdenko	Strzelce-Drezdenko
Guschter-holländer	Friedeberg				Goszcza-nowiec	Gmina Drezdenko	Strzelce-Drezdenko
Gust	Köslin				Gozd	Gmina Bobolice	Koszalin
Gustkow	Bütow				Gostkowo	Bytów	Bytów
Gustow	Rügen	Gustow	Bergen auf Rügen	Rügen			
Gutsdorf	Dramburg				Cybowo	Kalisz Pomorski	Drawsko
Gutzmin	Schlawe				Chocimino	Polanów	Koszalin
Hackenwalde	Naugard				Krępsko	Goleniów	Goleniów
Haferwiese	Friedeberg				Łącznica	Stare Kurowo	Strzelce-Drezdenko
Hagelfelde	Arnswalde				Przeczno	Bierzwnik	Choszczno
Hagen	Cammin				Reclaw	Wolin	Kamień
Hagen	Uecker-münde				Tatynia	Police	Police
Hagenow	Greifenberg				Bieczyno	Trzebiatów	Gryfice
Hammer	Cammin				Babigoszcz	Przybiernów	Goleniów
Hammer	Friedeberg				Karwin	Gmina Drezdenko	Strzelce-Drezdenko
Hammer	Netzekreis				Kuźnica Czarnkowska	Czarnków	Czarnków-Trzcianka
Hammer	Neustettin				Kuźnica Drawska	Czaplinek	Drawsko
Hammer (Amt Jasenitz)	Uecker-münde				Drogoradz	Police	Police
Hammer (Amt Ueckermünde)	Uecker-münde	Hammer an der Uecker	Torgelow-Ferdinandshof	Uecker-Randow			
Hammerfelde	Lauenburg				Chmieleniec	Łęczyce	Wejherowo
Hammermühle	Rummels-burg				Kępice	Kępice	Słupski
Hansfelde	Deutsch Krone				Kłosowo	Wałcz	Wałcz
Hansfelde	Netzekreis				Gieczynek	Wieleń	Czarnków-Trzcianka
Hansfelde	Saatzig				Tychowo	Stargard Szczeciński	Stargard
Hansfelde	Schlochau				Nadziejewo	Czarne	Człuchów
Hanshagen	Greifswald	Hanshagen	Lubmin	Ost-vorpommern			
Harmelsdorf	Deutsch Krone				Rutwica	Wałcz	Wałcz
Harmsdorf	Cammin				Niewiadowo	Goleniów	Goleniów
Haseleu	Regenwalde				Orle	Radowo Małe	Łobez
Hasenberg	Deutsch Krone				Dolaszewo	Szydłowo	Piła
Hasenfier	Neustettin				Ciosaniec	Okonek	Złotów
Hasseldorf	Demmin	Lindenberg	Demmin-Land	Demmin			
Hassendorf	Arnswalde				Zólwino	Drawno	Choszczno
Haugsdorf	Deutsch Krone				Iłowiec	Wałcz	Wałcz
Hebron-damnitz	Stolp				Damnica	Damnica	Słupsk
Heidchen	Greifen-hagen				Nieznań	Stare Czarnowo	Gryfino
Heidebrink	Usedom-Wollin				Międzywodzie	Dziwnów	Kamień
Heidekavel	Arnswalde				Radachowo	Dobiegniew	Strzelce-Drezdenko
Heinrichsdorf	Greifen-hagen				Babinek	Banie	Gryfino
Heinrichsdorf	Neustettin				Siemczyno	Czaplinek	Drawsko
Heinrichsdorf	Rummels-burg				Przeradz	Miastko	Bytów
Heinrichsruh	Uecker-münde	Heinrichs-ruh	Torgelow-Ferdinandshof	Uecker-Randow			
Heinrichs-walde	Schlochau				Uniechów	Debrzno	Człuchów
Heinrichs-walde	Uecker-münde	Heinrichs-walde	Torgelow-Ferdinandshof				
Helpe	Arnswalde				Chełpa	Choszczno	Choszczno
Henkendorf	Deutsch Krone				Hanki	Mirosławiec	Wałcz
Henkenhagen	Cammin				Upadły	Golczewo	Kamień
Henkenhagen	Kolberg-Körlin				Ustronie Morskie	Ustronie Morskie	Kołobrzeg
Henkenhagen	Regenwalde				Wiewiecko	Węgorzyno	Łobez
Heringsdorf	Usedom-Wollin	Heringsdorf	(amtsfrei)	Ost-vorpommern			
Hermanns-hagen (Dorf)	Franzburg-Barth	Saal	Barth	Vorpommern-Rügen			
Hermanns-hagen (Heide)	Franzburg-Barth	Bartels-hagen	Barth	Vorpommern-Rügen			
Hermannshöhe	Stolp				Radosław	Potęgowo	Słupsk
Hermannshof	Franzburg-Barth	Bartels-hagen	Barth	Vorpommern-Rügen			
Herrmannsthal	Cammin				Racimierz	Stepnica	Goleniów
Hermelsdorf	Naugard				Nastazin	Maszewo	Goleniów
Hermsdorf	Friedeberg				Chomętowo	Dobiegniew	Strzelce-Drezdenko
Hertelsaue	Arnswalde				Jaźwiny	Drawno	Choszczno
Herzberg	Dramburg				Sośnica	Wierzchowo	Drawsko
Heydebreck	Regenwalde				Potuliniec	Płoty	Gryfice
Hiddensee	Rügen	Insel Hiddensee	West-Rügen	Rügen			
Hildebrands-hagen	Grimmen	Behnken-dorf	Miltzow	Vorpommern-Rügen			
Hindenburg	Naugard				Kościuszki	Nowogard	Goleniów
Hintersee	Uecker-münde	Hintersee	Am Stettiner Haff	Uecker-Randow			
Hinzendorf	Naugard				Sowno	Płoty	Gryfice
Hirschfelde (bis 1936 = Jellentsch)	Bütow				Jeleńcz	Parchowo	Bytów
Hitzdorf	Arnswalde				Objezierze	Krzęcin	Choszczno
Hochfelde	Neustettin				Śmiadowo	Borne Sulinowo	Szczecinek
Hochzeit	Arnswalde				Stare Osieczno	Dobiegniew	Strzelce-Drezdenko
Hölkewiese	Rummels-burg				Kołtki	Biały Bór	Szczecinek
Hofdamm	Greifen-hagen				Dębina	Stare Czarnowo	Gryfino
Hoff	Greifenberg				Trzęsacz	Rewal	Gryfice
Hoffstädt	Deutsch Krone				Rudki	Wałcz	Wałcz
Hohen-bollentin	Demmin	Hohen-bollentin	Demmin-Land	Demmin			
Hohenbrück	Cammin				Widzieńsko	Stepnica	Goleniów
Hohen-brünzow	Demmin	Hohen-mocker	Demmin-Land	Demmin			
Hohen Drosedow	Greifenberg				Drozdowo	Karnice	Gryfice
Hohenfelde	Köslin				Miłogoszcz	Będzino	Koszalin
Hohenfelde	Lauenburg				Wysokie	Łęczyce	Wejherowo
Hohenholz	Greifen-hagen	Krackow	Löcknitz-Penkun	Uecker-Randow			
Hohenkarzig	Friedeberg				Gardzko	Strzelce Krajeńskie	Strzelce-Drezdenko
Hohenlinde (bis 1936 = Bochowke)	Stolp				Bochówko	Czarna Dąbrówka	Bytów
Hohenmocker	Demmin	Hohen-mocker	Demmin-Land	Demmin			
Hohen-reinkendorf	Greifen-hagen	Gartz (Oder)	Gartz (Oder)	Uckermark			
Hohen Schönau	Naugard				Jenikowo	Maszewo	Golenów
Hohen-selchow	Greifen-hagen	Hohen-selchow-Groß Pinnow	Gartz (Oder)	Uckermark			
Hohenstein	Deutsch Krone				Górnica	Wałcz	Wałcz
Hohenstein	Stolp				Wodnica	Ustka	Słupsk
Hohenwalde	Pyritz				Gleźno	Choszczno	Choszczno
Hohen-waldheim	Lauenburg				Żelazna	Choczewo	Wejherowo
Hohenwardin	Belgard				Wardyń Górny	Połczyn Zdrój	Świdwin
Holm	Greifenberg				Chełm Gryficki	Trzebiatów	Gryfice
Holzhagen	Cammin				Leszczno	Przybiernów	Goleniów
Holzkathen	Stolp				Smołdziński Las	Smołdzino, Słupsk County	Słupsk
Hoppenwalde	Uecker-münde	Eggesin	Am Stettiner Haff	Uecker-Randow			
Hornskrug	Naugard				Rzęśnica	Goleniów	Goleniów
Horst	Greifenberg				Niechorze	Rewal	Gryfice
Horst	Grimmen	Horst	Miltzow	Vorpommern-Rügen			
Horst	Pyritz				Turze	Pyrzyce	Pyrzyce
Horst	Regenwalde				Chwarstno	Węgorzyno	Łobez
Horst	Stolp				Pęplino	Ustka	Słupsk
Hüttchen	Netzekreis				Rudka	Trzcianka	Czarnków-Trzcianka
Hütten	Neustettin				Sitno	Szczecinek	Szczecinek
Hugoldsdorf	Franzburg-Barth	Hugoldsdorf	Recknitz-Trebeltal	Vorpommern-Rügen			
Hundskopf	Dramburg				Psie Głowy	Czaplinek	Drawsko
Hygendorf	Bütow				Udorpie	Bytów	Bytów
Kaffzig	Rummels-burg				Kawcze	Miastko	Bytów
Kahlen	Cammin				Kaleń	Świerzno	Kamień
Kalenberg	Neustettin				Uraz	Złocieniec	Drawsko
Kaltenhagen	Köslin				Kladno	Będzino	Koszalin
Kambz	Cammin				Kępica	Świerzno	Kamień
Kamelow	Lauenburg				Kębłowo	Luzino	Wejherowo
Kamissow	Belgard				Kamosowo	Białogard	Białogard
Kamminke	Usedom-Wollin	Kamminke	Usedom-Süd	Ost-vorpommern			
Kamnitz	Rummels-burg				Kamnica	Miastko	Bytów
Kamp-Wustrow	Greifenberg				(nicht mehr existent)		
Kandelin	Grimmen	Süderholz	(amtsfrei)	Vorpommern-Rügen			
Kankelfitz	Regenwalde				Kakolewice	Węgorzyno	Łobez
Kannenberg	Saatzig				Kania	Chociwel	Stargard
Kannin	Schlawe				Kanin	Postomino	Sławno
Kantreck	Cammin				Łoźnica	Przybiernów	Goleniów
Kappe	Deutsch Krone				Kępa	Trzcianka	Czarnków-Trzcianka
Karkow	Saatzig				Karkowo	Chociwel	Stargard
Karlsbach	Naugard				Strumiany	Stargard Szczeciński	Stargard
Karlsdorf	Flatow				Lugi	Zakrzewo	Złotów
Karlshagen	Usedom-Wollin	Karlshagen	Usedom-Nord	Ost-vorpommern			
Karlshof	Naugard				Komarowo	Goleniów	Goleniów
Karlshorst	Netzekreis				Dluzewo	Trzcianka	Czarnków-Trzcianka
Karlsruhe	Deutsch Krone				Ługi Wałeckie	Wałcz	Wałcz
Karlsthal	Saatzig				Granica	Ińsko	Stargard
Karlswalde	Rummels-burg				Pódgorze	Kołczygłowy	Bytów
Karnin a.U.	Usedom-Wollin	Usedom	Usedom-Süd	Ost-vorpommern			
Karnitz	Greifenberg				Karnice	Karnice	Gryfice
Karnitz	Regenwalde				Karnice	Radowo Małe	Łobez
Karnitz	Rügen	Garz/Rügen	Bergen auf Rügen	Rügen			
Karnkewitz	Schlawe				Karnie-szewice	Sianów	Koszalin
Karolina	Netzekreis				Rychlik	Trzcianka	Czarnków-Trzcianka
Karolinen-hof	Regenwalde				Cieszyce	Brojce	Gryfice
Karolinen-horst	Greifen-hagen				Reptowo	Kobylanka	Stargard
Karow	Regenwalde				Karwowo	Łobez	Łobez
Karow	Rügen	Bergen auf Rügen	Bergen auf Rügen	Rügen			
Karpin	Uecker-münde				Karpin	Police	Police
Karsbaum	Belgard				Karsibór	Brzeżno	Świdwin
Karstnitz (bis 1937 = Deutsch Karstnitz)	Stolp				Karzniczka	Damnica	Słupsk
Kartlow	Belgard				Kartlewo	Świdwin	Świdwin
Kartlow	Cammin				Kartlewo	Przybiernów	Goleniów
Kartlow	Demmin	Kruckow	Jarmen-Tutow	Demmin			
Kartzig	Naugard				Karsk	Nowogard	Goleniów
Karwen	Stolp				Karwno	Czarna Dąbrówka	Bytów
Karwitz	Dramburg				Karwice	Drawsko Pomorskie	Drawsko
Karwitz	Schlawe				Karwice	Malechowo	Sławno
Karzig	Usedom-Wollin				Karnocice	Wolin	Kamień
Karzin	Schlawe				Karsino	Postomino	Sławno
Karzin	Stolp				Karzcino	Słupsk	Słupsk
Kaseburg	Usedom-Wollin				Świnoujście	Świnoujście	(City County)
Kasekow	Greifen-hagen	Casekow	Gartz (Oder)	Uckermark			
Kashagen	Saatzig				Kozy	Dobrzany	Stargard
Kasimirshof	Neustettin				Kazimierz	Biały Bór	Szczecinek
Kaslin	Demmin	Beggerow	Demmin-Land	Demmin			
Kasnevitz	Rügen	Putbus	(amtsfrei)	Rügen			
Kathkow	Bütow				Chotkowo	Borzytuchom	Bytów
Katschow	Usedom-Wollin	Dargen	Usedom-Süd	Ost-vorpommern			
Kattenhof	Naugard				Katy	Goleniów	Goleniów
Kattschow	Lauenburg				Kaczkowo	Łęczyce	Wejherowo
Kattun	Deutsch Krone				Kotun	Szydłowo	Pila
Kavelsberg	Belgard				Ogrodno	Połczyn Zdrój	Świdwin
Kegelsmühl	Deutsch Krone				Kloda	Szydłowo	Pila
Kehrberg	Greifen-hagen				Krzywin	Widuchowa	Gryfino
Kempendorf	Saatzig				Kepno	Dobrzany	Stargard
Kenz	Franzburg-Barth	Kenz-Küstrow	Barth	Vorpommern-Rügen			
Kerschkow	Lauenburg				Kierzkowo	Choczewo	Wejherowo
Kerstin	Kolberg-Körlin				Karscino	Karlino	Białogard
Keßburg	Deutsch Krone				Karsibór	Wałcz	Wałcz
Kessin	Demmin	Grapzow	Treptower Tollensewinkel	Demmin			
Kicker	Naugard				Kikorze	Osina	Goleniów
Kieckow	Belgard				Kikowo	Tychowo	Białogard
Kienwerder	Netzekreis				Brzegi	Krzyż Wielkopolski	Czarnków-Trzcianka
Kietz	Dramburg				Kalisz Pomorski	Kalisz Pomorski	Drawsko
Kietz	Flatow				Skic	Złotów	Złotów
Kietzig	Saatzig				Kicko	Stara Dąbrowa	Stargard
Kirchhagen	Greifenberg				Konarzewo	Karnice	Gryfice
Kirschdorf	Flatow				Nowa Wiesniewka	Zakrzewo	Złotów
Kitzerow	Saatzig				Kiczarowo	Stargard Szczeciński	Stargard
Kladow	Greifen-hagen				Kłodowo	Widuchowa	Gryfino
Klätkow	Greifenberg				Kłodkowo	Trzebiatów	Gryfice
Klannin	Köslin				Klanino	Gmina Bobolice	Koszalin
Klatzow	Demmin	Alten-treptow	Treptower Tollensewinkel	Demmin			
Klausdorf	Deutsch Krone				Kłębowiec	Wałcz	Wałcz
Klausdorf	Dramburg				(nicht mehr existent)		
Klausdorf	Franzburg-Barth	Klausdorf	Altenpleen	Vorpommern-Rügen			
Klausfelde	Schlochau				Jaromierz	Człuchów	Człuchów
Klaushagen	Neustettin				Kluczewo	Czaplinek	Drawsko
Klaushagen	Regenwalde				Przytoń	Węgorzyno	Łobez
Klawitters-dorf	Deutsch Krone				Głowaczewo	Wałcz	Wałcz
Klebow	Dramburg				Chlebowo	Ostrowice	Drawsko
Klebow	Greifen-hagen				Chlebowo	Gryfino	Gryfino
Klein Boschpol	Lauenburg				Bożepole Małe	Łęczyce	Wejherowo
Klein Brüskow	Stolp				Bruskowo Małe	Słupsk	Słupsk
Klein Butzig	Flatow				Mały Buczek	Lipka	Złotów
Klein Dallenthin	Neustettin				Dalęcinko	Szczecinek	Szczecinek
Klein Damerkow	Lauenburg				Dąbrówka	Gniewino	Wejherowo
Klein Drensen	Netzekreis				Dzierzazno Male	Wieleń	Czarnków-Trzcianka
Klein Friedrichsberg	Flatow				Drozyska Małe	Zakrzewo	Złotów
Klein Gansen	Stolp				Gałąźnia Mała	Kołczygłowy	Bytów
Klein Garde	Stolp				Gardna Mała	Smołdzino	Słupsk
Klein Gluschen	Stolp				Głuszynko	Potęgowo	Słupsk
Klein Jannewitz	Lauenburg				Janowiczki	Nowa Wieś Lęborska	Lębork
Klein Jestin	Landkreis Kolberg-Körlin				Gościnko	Karlino	Białogard
Klein Justin	Cammin				Gostyniec	Świerzno	Kamień
Klein Karzenburg	Rummels-burg				Sępolno Małe	Biały Bór	Szczecinek
Klein Küdde	Neustettin				Gwda Mała	Szczecinek	Szczecinek
Klein Leistikow	Naugard				Lestkówko	Nowogard	Goleniów
Klein Lienichen	Saatzig				Linówko	Ińsko	Stargard
Klein Lubs	Netzekreis				Lubcz Maly	Krzyż Wielkopolski	Czarnków-Trzcianka
Klein Machmin	Stolp				Machowinko	Ustka	Słupsk
Klein Masswo	Lauenburg				Maszewko	Wicko	Lębork
Klein Massowitz	Bütow				Masłowiczki	Tuchomie	Bytów
Klein Mellen	Dramburg				Mielenko Drawski	Drawsko Pomorskie	Drawsko
Klein Möllen	Greifen-hagen				Mielenko Gryfinski	Gryfino	Gryfino
Kleinmöllen	Köslin				Mielenko	Mielno	Koszalin
Klein Mokratz	Usedom-Wollin				Mokrzyca Mala	Wolin	Kamień
Klein Nakel	Deutsch Krone				Nakielno	Wałcz	Wałcz
Klein Nossin	Stolp				Nożynko	Czarna Dąbrówka	Bytów
Klein Panknin	Belgard				Pękaninko	Białogard	Białogard
Klein Podel	Stolp				Podole Małe	Dębnica Kaszubska	Słupsk
Klein Pomeiske	Bütow				Pomysk Mały	Bytów	Bytów
Klein Raddow	Regenwalde				Radowo Male	Radowo Małe	Łobez
Klein Rakitt	Stolp				Rokitki	Czarna Dąbrówka	Bytów
Klein Rambin	Belgard				Rąbinko	Rąbino	Świdwin
Klein Rischow	Pyritz				Ryszewko	Pyrzyce	Pyrzyce
Klein Runow	Schlawe				Runowo Sławieńskie	Kobylnica	Słupsk
Klein Sabin	Dramburg				Zabinek	Wierzchowo	Drawsko
Klein Sabow	Naugard				Żabówko	Nowogard	Goleniów
Klein Satspe	Belgard				Zaspy Małe	Białogard	Białogard
Klein Schlatikow	Saatzig				Słodkówko	Suchań	Stargard
Klein Schönfeld	Greifen-hagen				Chwarstnica	Gryfino	Gryfino
Klein Schwarzsee	Neustettin				Czarne Małe	Czaplinek	Drawsko
Klein Schwichow	Lauenburg				Świchowo	Łęczyce	Wejherowo
Klein Schwirsen	Rummels-burg				Świerzenko	Miastko	Bytów
Klein Silber	Arnswalde				Suliborek	Recz	Choszczno
Klein Silkow	Stolp				Żelkówko	Kobylnica	Słupsk
Klein Spiegel	Saatzig				Pożrzadło Małe	Kalisz Pomorski	Drawsko
Klein Strellin	Stolp				Strzelinko	Słupsk	Słupsk
Klein Teetzleben	Demmin	Groß Teetzleben	Treptower Tollensewinkel	Demmin			
Klein Tuchen	Bütow				Tuchomko	Tuchomie	Bytów
Klein Volz	Rummels-burg				Wołcza Mała	Miastko	Bytów
Klein Wachlin	Naugard				Warchlinko	Stargard Szczeciński	Stargard
Klein Wittenberg	Deutsch Krone				Jaraczewo	Szydłowo	Piła
Klein Zacharin	Neustettin				Czochryń	Borne Sulinowo	Szczecinek
Klein Zapplin	Greifenberg				Czaplin Mały	Karnice	Gryfice
Klein Zarnewanz	Grimmen	Süderholz	(amtsfrei)	Vorpommern-Rügen			
Klein Zarnow	Greifenhagen				Czarnówko	Widuchowa	Gryfino
Klein Zicker	Rügen	Thiessow	Mönchgut-Granitz	Rügen			
Kleist	Köslin				Kleszcze	Sianów	Koszalin
Klemmen	Cammin				Kłęby	Golczewo	Kamień
Klemmen	Pyritz				Kłęby	Warnice	Pyrzyce
Klempenow	Demmin	Breest	Treptower Tollensewinkel	Demmin			
Klempin	Belgard				Klępino Białogardz-kie	Białogard	Białogard
Klempin	Saatzig				Klępino	Stargard Szczeciński	Stargard
Klemzow	Belgard				Klępczewo	Świdwin	Świdwin
Klenzin	Stolp				Klęcino	Główczyce	Słupsk
Kleschin	Flatow				Kleszczyna	Złotów	Złotów
Kleschinz	Stolp				Klesz-czyniec	Czarna Dąbrówka	Bytów
Kletzin	Demmin	Kletzin	Demmin-Land	Demmin			
Klevenow	Grimmen	Süderholz	(amtsfrei)	Vorpommern-Rügen			
Klingbeck	Neustettin				Radomyśl	Grzmiąca	Szczecinek
Klöpperfier	Neustettin				Chłopowo	Barwice	Szczecinek
Klößen	Bütow				Klosy	Czarna Dąbrówka	Bytów
Klötzin	Belgard				Kłodzino	Rąbino	Świdwin
Klötzin	Cammin				Kłodzino	Golczewo	Kamień
Klosterfelde	Arnswalde				Klasztorne	Bierzwnik	Choszczno
Klotzen	Neustettin				Klodzino	Barwice	Szczecinek
Kloxin	Pyritz				Klodzino	Przelewice	Pyrzyce
Klucken	Stolp				Kluki	Smoldzino	Słupsk
Klücken	Pyritz				Kluki	Przelewice	Pyrzyce
Klützkow	Belgard				Kluczkowo	Świdwin	Świdwin
Klützow	Pyritz				Stargard Szczeciński-Kluczewo	Stargard Szczeciński	Stargard
Kluis	Rügen	Kluis	West-Rügen	Rügen			
Kluß	Köslin				Klos	Sianów	Koszalin
Knakendorf	Deutsch Krone				Rzeczyca	Tuczno	Wałcz
Kniewen-bruch	Lauenburg				Kniewo	Wejherowo	Wejherowo
Kniprode	Bütow				Półczno	Studzienice	Bytów
Knurrbusch	Cammin				Trzebieradz	Świerzno	Kamień
Koblentz	Uecker-münde	Koblentz	Uecker-Randow-Tal	Uecker-Randow			
Kodram	Usedom-Wollin				Kodrab	Wolin	Kamień
Kölln	Demmin	Werder	Treptower Tollensewinkel	Demmin			
Kölpin	Arnswalde				Kielpino	Drawno	Choszczno
Kölpin	Flatow				Kielpin	Lipka	Zlotów
Kölpin	Kolberg-Körlin				Kielpino	Brojce	Gryfice
Kölpin	Neustettin				Kiełpino	Borne Sulinowo	Szczecinek
Kölzig	Arnswalde				Kolsk	Bierzwnik	Choszczno
Königsdorf	Flatow				Czernice	Zakrzewo	Zlotów
Königsfelde	Uecker-münde				Nieklonczyca	Police	Police
Königsgnade	Deutsch Krone				Jamienko	Tuczno	Wałcz
Köntopf	Dramburg				Konotop	Drawsko Pomorskie	Drawsko
Köpitz	Cammin				Kopice	Stepnica	Goleniów
Köpnitz	Schlawe				Kopnica	Darlowo	Sławno
Körlin	Schlawe				Korlino	Postomino	Sławno
Körtenthin	Usedom-Wollin				Korzecin	Wolin	Kamień
Köselitz	Cammin				Kozielice	Golczewo	Kamień
Köselitz	Pyritz				Kozielice	Kozielice	Pyrzyce
Kösternitz	Belgard				Kosciernica	Białogard	Białogard
Kösternitz	Schlawe				Kosciernica	Polanów	Koszalin
Köstin	Uecker-münde				Koscino	Dobra	Police
Kolbatz	Greifen-hagen				Kolbacz	Stare Czarnowo	Gryfino
Kolberger Deep	Kolberg-Körlin				Dzwirzyno	Kolobrzeg	Kołobrzeg
Kolbitzow	Greifen-hagen				Kolbaskowo	Kolbaskowo	Police
Koldemanz	Greifenberg				Kolomac	Gryfice	Gryfice
Kolkau	Lauenburg				Kolkowo	Gniewino	Wejherowo
Kollatz	Belgard				Kolacz	Polczyn Zdrój	Świdwin
Kollin	Pyritz				Kolin	Dolice	Stargard
Kolow	Greifen-hagen				Kolowo	Stare Czarnowo	Gryfino
Kolzow	Usedom-Wollin				Kolczewo	Wolin	Kamień
Konikow	Köslin				Konikowo	Swieszyno	Koszalin
Konstanti-nopel	Saatzig				Dolice	Dobrzany	Stargard
Kopahn	Schlawe				Kopan	Darlowo	Sławno
Koppalin	Lauenburg				Kopalino	Choczewo	Wejherowo
Koppenow	Lauenburg				Kopaniewo	Wicko	Lebork
Kordeshagen	Köslin				Dobrzyca	Będzino	Koszalin
Korkenhagen	Naugard				Budzie-szowce	Maszewo	Goleniów
Korswandt	Usedom-Wollin	Korswandt	Usedom-Süd	Ost-vorpommern			
Kortenhagen	Greifen-hagen				Kartno	Stare Czarnowo	Gryfino
Koschütz	Deutsch Krone				Piła- Koszyce	Piła	Piła
Kose	Stolp				Kozy	Czarna Dąbrówka	Bytów
Koserow	Usedom-Wollin	Koserow	Usedom-Süd	Ost-vorpommern			
Kossin	Pyritz				Kosin	Przelewice	Pyrzyce
Kothlow	Köslin				Kotlowo	Biesiekierz	Koszalin
Kotten-hammer	Netzekreis				Kuzniczka	Wielen	Czarnków-Trzcianka
Kottow	Stolp				Kotowo	Debnica Kaszubska	Słupsk
Kowalk	Belgard				Kowalki	Tychowo	Białogard
Kowanz	Kolberg-Körlin				Kowancz	Karlino	Białogard
Krackow	Greifen-hagen	Krackow	Löcknitz-Penkun	Uecker-Randow			
Krahnsfelde	Lauenburg				Chrzanowo	Leczyce	Wejherowo
Krakvitz	Rügen	Putbus	(amtsfrei)	Rügen			
Kramerhof	Franzburg-Barth	Kramerhof	Altenpleen	Vorpommern-Rügen			
Kramonsdorf	Naugard				Krzemienna	Dobra	Lobez
Krampe	Köslin				Krepa	Gmina Bobolice	Koszalin
Krampe	Lauenburg				Krępa Kaszubska	Nowa Wieś Lęborska	Lębork
Krampe	Stolp				Krepa Słupska	Słupsk	Słupsk
Krampke-witz	Lauenburg				Krepkowice	Cewice	Lebork
Kramsk	Schloachau				Krepsk	Czluchów	Czluchów
Kramske	Deutsch Krone				Krepsko	Szydlowo	Piła
Krangen	Neustettin				Kragi	Borne Sulinowo	Szczecinek
Krangen	Schlawe				Krag	Polanów	Koszalin
Kranzfelde	Greifen-hagen				Krzypnica	Gryfino	Gryfino
Kranzin	Arnswalde				Krzecin	Krzecin	Choszczno
Kratzig	Köslin				Kraśnik Koszalinski	Biesiekierz	Koszalin
Kratzig	Regenwalde				Kraśnik Lobeski	Wegorzyno	Lobez
Kratznick	Arnswalde				Kraśnik	Recz	Choszczno
Kreitzig	Belgard				Krzecko	Slawoborze	Świdwin
Kremerbruch	Rummels-burg				Kramarzyny	Tuchomie	Bytów
Kremmin	Saatzig				Krzemien	Dobrzany	Stargard
Kremzow	Pyritz				Krepcewo	Dolice	Stargard
Kretlow	Cammin				Kretlewo	Golczewo	Kamień
Krettmin	Köslin				Kretomino	Manowo	Koszalin
Krien	Anklam	Krien	Anklam-Land	Ost-vorpommern			
Krien	Stolp				Krzynia	Debnica Kaszubska	Słupsk
Kriewitz	Naugard				Krzywice	Osina	Goleniów
Kriwan	Stolp				Krzywan	Debnica Kaszubska	Słupsk
Kröslin	Greifswald	Kröslin	Lubmin	Ost-vorpommern			
Krolow	Schlawe				Królewo	Postomino	Sławno
Krolowstrand	Schlawe				Królewice	Postomino	Sławno
Kronheide	Greifen-hagen				Żórawie	Gryfino	Gryfino
Kroßnow	Bütow				Krosnowo	Borzytuchom	Bytów
Kruckow	Demmin	Kruckow	Jarmen-Tutow	Demmin			
Krüssow	Pyritz				Kurcewo	Stargard Szczeciński	Stargard
Krugsdorf	Uecker-münde	Krugsdorf	Uecker-Randow-Tal	Uecker-Randow			
Krummen-fließ	Flatow				Krzywa Wies	Zlotów	Zlotów
Krummen-hagen	Franzburg-Barth	Steinhagen	Niepars	Vorpommern-Rügen			
Krummensee	Schlochau				Krzemie-niewo	Czarne	Czluchów
Krummfließ	Deutsch Krone				Pokrzywnica	Szydlowo	Piła
Krummin	Usedom-Wollin	Krummin	Am Peenestrom	Ost-vorpommern			
Krusemarkshagen	Demmin	Lindenberg	Demmin-Land	Demmin			
Krussen	Stolp				Kruszyna	Kobylnica	Słupsk
Kublank	Greifen-hagen				Kobylanka	Kobylanka	Stargard
Kublitz	Stolp				Kobylnica	Kobylnica	Słupsk
Kucherow	Neustettin				Kucharowo	Borne Sulinowo	Szczecinek
Kucklow	Cammin				Kukulowo	Kamien Pomorski	Kamień
Kückenhagen (Kückenshagen)	Franzburg-Barth	Saal	Barth	Vorpommern-Rügen			
Küddowtal	Netzekreis				Piła-Motylewo	Piła	Piła
Külz	Naugard				Kulice	Nowogard	Goleníów
Kümken	Regenwalde				Kumki	Drawsko Pomorskie	Drawsko-Pomorskie
Kürtow	Arnswalde				Korytowo	Choszczno	Choszczno
Küstrow	Franzburg-Barth	Kenz-Küstrow	Barth	Vorpommern-Rügen			
Kuhtz	Schlawe				Kusice	Malechowo	Sławno
Kujan	Flatow				Kujan	Zakrzewo	Zlotów
Kukahn	Greifenberg				Kukan	Gryfice	Gryfice
Kulsow	Stolp				Kuleszewo	Kobylnica	Słupsk
Kummerow	Demmin	Kummerow	Malchin am Kummerower See	Demmin			
Kummerow	Franzburg-Barth	Kummerow	Niepars	Vorpommern-Rügen			
Kummerow	Greifen-hagen	Schwedt	Schwedt	Uckermark			
Kummerow	Regenwalde				Komorowo	Resko	Lobez
Kummerow (Gm. Bosens)	Schlawe				Komorowo	Polanów	Koszalin
Kummerzin	Schlawe				Komorczyn	Kobylnica	Słupsk
Kummin	Cammin				Chomino	Świerzno	Kamień
Kunow	Cammin				Koniewo	Wolin	Kamień
Kunow	Greifen-hagen				Kunowo	Banie	Gryfino
Kunow	Greifen-hagen (früher Kreis Randow)	Schwedt	Schwedt	Uckermark			
Kunow a./Straße	Saatzig				Kunowo	Kobylanka	Stargard
Kunsow	Stolp				Konczewo	Kobylnica	Słupsk
Kuntzow	Greifswald	Bandelin	Züssow	Ost-vorpommern			
Kurow	Köslin				Kurowo	Gmina Bobolice	Koszalin
Kurow	Lauenburg				Kurowo	Choczewo	Wejherowo
Kursewanz	Köslin				Kurozwecz	Swieszyno	Koszalin
Kussenow	Belgard				Koszanowo	Brzezno	Świdwin
Kusserow	Schlawe				Kosierzewo	Malechowo	Sławno
Kussow	Neustettin				Kusowo	Szczecinek	Szczecinek
Kutzer	Regenwalde				Kocierz	Płoty	Gryfice
Machern	Friedeberg				Machary	Strzelce Krajenskie	Strzelce Krajenskie-Drezdenko
Machlin	Deutsch Krone				Machliny	Czaplinek	Drawsko
Mackensen	Lauenburg				Chocielewko	Nowa Wies Leborska	Lebork
Mackfitz	Regenwalde				Makowice	Ploty	Gryfice
Mahlzow	Usedom-Wollin	Wolgast	Am Peenestrom	Ost-vorpommern			
Mahnwitz	Stolp				Mianowice	Damnica	Słupsk
Malchow	Schlawe				Malechowo	Malechowo	Sławno
Maldewin	Regenwalde				Moldawin	Radowo Male	Lobez
Mallnow	Kolberg-Körlin				Malonowo	Karlino	Białogard
Mallschütz	Lauenburg				Maloszyce	Nowa Wies Leborska	Lebork
Malzkow	Stolp				Malczkowo	Potegowo	Słupsk
Mandelatz	Belgard				Modrolas	Tychowo	Białogard
Mangwitz	Bütow				Madrzechowo	Bytów	Bytów
Mannhagen	Grimmen	Miltzow	Miltzow	Vorpommern-Rügen			
Manow	Köslin				Manowo	Manowo	Koszalin
Mansfelde	Friedeberg				Lipie Góry	Strzelce Krajenskie	Strzelce Krajenskie-Drezdenko
Marienbusch	Netzekreis				Srednica (bis 1981: Wielka Bieda)	Czarnków	Czarnków-Trzcianka
Mariendorf	Netzekreis				Marianowo	Wielen	Czarnków-Trzcianka
Marienfelde	Schlochau				Mysligoszcz	Debrzno	Czluchów
Marienfließ	Saatzig				Marianowo	Marianowo	Stargard
Marienhagen	Saatzig				Oswino	Chociwel	Stargard
Marienthal	Friedeberg				Marzenin	Gmina Drezdenko	Strzelce Krajenskie-Drezdenko
Marienthal	Greifen-hagen				Baniewice	Banie	Gryfino
Marienthal	Schlawe				Pomilowo	Sławno	Sławno
Marienwalde	Arnswalde				Bierzwnik	Bierzwnik	Choszczno
Marienwalde	Neustettin				Czersk	Okonek	Zlotów
Marienwerder	Pyritz				Zaleze	Kozielice	Pyrzyce
Marquards-mühl	Cammin				Borucin	Kamien Pomorski	Kamień
Marsdorf	Naugard				Marszewo	Goleniów	Goleniów
Marsow	Schlawe				Marszewo	Postomino	Sławno
Martensdorf	Franzburg-Barth	Niepars	Niepars	Vorpommern-Rügen			
Marthe	Deutsch Krone				Martew	Tuczno	Wałcz
Martinshagen	Schlawe				Grabowo	Malechowo	Sławno
Marwitz	Greifen-hagen				Marwice	Widuchowa	Gryfino
Marzdorf	Deutsch Krone				Marcinkowice	Tuczno	Wałcz
Marzelle	Arnswalde				Moczele	Dobiegniew	Strzelce Krajenskie-Drezdenko
Maskow	Köslin				Maszkowo	Sianów	Koszalin
Maskow	Naugard				Maszkowo	Nowogard	Goleniów
Masselwitz	Schlawe				Maslowice	Postomino	Sławno
Matzdorf	Naugard				Maciejewo	Maszewo	Goleniów
Mechenthin	Kolberg-Körlin				Miechecino	Dygowo	Koszalin
Meddersin	Bütow				Niedarzyno	Borzy-tuchom	Bytów
Medewitz	Cammin				Miodowice	Przybier-nów	Goleniów
Medewitz	Greifenberg				Niedzwied-ziska	Gryfice	Gryfice
Medow	Anklam	Medow	Anklam-Land	Ost-vorpommern			
Meesiger	Demmin	Meesiger	Demmin-Land	Demmin			
Meesow	Regenwalde				Mieszewo	Wegorzyno	Lobez
Mehlgast	Deutsch Krone				Milogoszcz	Tuczno	Wałcz
Mehrenthin	Friedeberg				Mierzecin	Dobiegniew	Strzelce Krajenskie-Drezdenko
Meiers- berg-Schlabren-dorf	Uecker-münde	Meiersberg	Am Stettiner Haff	Uecker-Randow			
Meitzow	Schlawe				Mazów	Postomino	Sławno
Mellen	Regenwalde				Mielno	Wegorzyno	Lobez
Mellenthin	Usedom-Wollin	Mellenthin	Usedom-Süd	Ost-vorpommern			
Mellentin	Deutsch Krone				Mielecin	Czlopa	Wałcz
Mellin	Stolp				Mielno	Debnica Kaszubska	Słupsk
Mersin	Köslin				Mierzym	Swieszyno	Koszalin
Mersin	Lauenburg				Mierzyno	Gniewino	Wejherowo
Mescherin	Greifen-hagen	Mescherin	Gartz (Oder)	Uckermark			
Meseken-hagen	Grimmen	Meseken-hagen	Landhagen	Ost-vorpommern			
Meseritz	Belgard				Miedzyr- zecze	Slawo-borze	Świdwin
Metschow	Demmin	Borrentin	Demmin-Land	Demmin			
Mewegen	Uecker-münde	Rothen-klempenow	Löcknitz-Penkun	Uecker-Randow			
Meyringen	Köslin				Kedzierzyn	Sianów	Koszalin
Michaelsdorf	Franzburg-Barth	Fuhlendorf	Barth	Vorpommern-Rügen			
Mickrow	Stolp				Mikorowo	Czarna Dąbrówka	Bytów
Middelhagen	Rügen	Middelhagen	Mönchgut-Granitz	Rügen			
Mienken	Arnswalde				Dominikowo	Drawno	Choszczno
Millienhagen	Franzburg-Barth	Millien-hagen-Oebelitz	Franzburg-Richtenberg	Nird-vorpommern			
Miltitzwalde	Demmin	Pripsleben	Treptower Tollensewinkel	Demmin			
Miltzow	Grimmen	Miltzow	Miltzow	Vorpommern-Rügen			
Minettenruh	Netzekreis				Usypisko	(Ort nicht auffindbar)	
Minten	Naugard				Mietno	Nowogard	Goleniów
Mischke	Netzekreis				Mniszek	Wielen	Czarnków-Trzcianka
Misdow	Rummels-burg				Mzdowo	Kepice	Słupsk
Misdroy	Usedom-Wollin				Miedzyz- droje	Miedzyz-droje	Kamień
Missow	Rummels-burg				Miszewo	Trzebielino	Bytów
Mittel Friedrichs-berg	Flatow				Drozyska Srednie	Zakrzewo	Zlotów
Mittelhagen	Greifenberg				Rogozina	Trzebiatów	Gryfice
Mocker	Köslin				Mokre	Sianów	Koszalin
Modder-wiese	Friedeberg				Grotów	Gmina Drezdenko	Strzelce Krajenskie-Drezdenko
Moddrow	Bütow				Modrzejewo	Tuchomie	Bytów
Moderow	Saatzig				Modrzewo	Suchan	Stargard
Möllendorf	Pyritz				Mlyny	Pyrzyce	Pyrzyce
Mölschow	Usedom-Wollin	Mölschow	Usedom-Nord	Ost-Vorpommern			
Mönchkappe	Greifen-hagen				Zabnica	Gryfino	Gryfino
Mönkebude	Uecker-münde	Mönkebude	Am Stettiner Haff	Uecker-Randow			
Mohrow	Kolberg-Körlin				Morowo	Siemysl	Kołobrzeg
Moitzelfitz	Kolberg-Körlin				Myslowice	Slawo-borze	Świdwin
Mokratz	Cammin				Mokrawica	Kamien Pomorski	Kamień
Moltzahn	Demmin	Borrentin	Demmin-Land	Demmin			
Moratz	Cammin				Moracz	Przybier-nów	Goleniów
Morgenitz	Usedom-Wollin	Mellenthin	Usedom-Süd	Ost-vorpommern			
Morgenstern	Bütow				Jutrzenka	Borzytu-chom	Bytów
Morgow	Cammin				Margowo	Świerzno	Kamień
Moritzfelde	Greifen-hagen				Morzyczyn	Kobylanka	Stargard
Mossin	Neustettin				Mosina	Szczecinek	Szczecinek
Mossin	Schlochau				Mosiny	Człuchów	Człuchów
Muddel	Stolp				Modła	Ustka	Słupsk
Muddelmow	Greifenberg				Modlimowo	Karnice	Gryfice
Muddelmow	Regenwalde				Modlimowo	Płoty	Gryfice
Mückenburg	Friedeberg				Sarbiewo	Zwierzyn	Strzelce-Drezdenko
Müggenburg	Franzburg-Barth	Zingst	(amtsfrei)	Vorpommern-Rügen			
Müggenburg	Uecker-münde	Heinrichsruh	Torgelow-Ferdinandshof	Uecker-Randow			
Müggenhall	Saatzig				Białuń	Stara Dąbrowa	Stargard
Müggenwalde	Grimmen	Splietsdorf	Franzburg-Richtenberg	Vorpommern-Rügen			
Mühlenkamp	Grimmen	Sassen-Trantow	Peenetal/Loitz	Demmin			
Mühlental (bis 1937 = Wottnogge)	Stolp				Otnoga	Czarna Dąbrówka	Bytów
Münchendorf	Naugard				Miekowo	Goleniów	Goleniów
Münsterberg	Naugard				Wielichówko	Kobylanka	Stargard
Mürbenfelde	Arnswalde				Karpin	Drawno	Choszczno
Müssentin	Demmin	Jarmen	Jarmen-Tutow	Demmin			
Mützelburg	Uecker-münde				Myślibórz Wielki	Nowe Warpno	Police
Mützenow	Stolp				Możdżanowo	Ustka	Słupsk
Muhlendorf	Regenwalde				Poradz	Łobez	Łobez
Mulkentin	Saatzig				Malkocin	Stargard Szczeciński	Stargard
Muscherin	Pyritz				Moskorzyn	Dolice	Stargard
Muttrin	Belgard				Motarzyn	Tychowo	Białogard
Muttrin	Stolp				Motarzyno	Dębnica Kaszubska	Słupsk
Nadrensee	Greifen-hagen	Nadrensee	Löcknitz-Penkun	Uecker-Randow			
Naffin	Belgard				Nawino	Białogard	Białogard
Nantikow	Arnswalde				Netkowo	Recz	Choszczno
Naseband	Neustettin				Nosibady	Grzmiaca	Szczecinek
Nassenheide	Uecker-münde				Rzedziny	Dobra	Police
Naßglienke	Neustettin				Glinki Mokre	Okonek	Zlotów
Natelfitz	Regenwalde				Natolewice	Ploty	Gryfice
Natzlaff	Schlawe				Naclaw	Polanów	Koszalin
Natzmers-dorf	Regenwalde				Nacmierz	Resko	Lobez
Natzmers-hagen	Schlawe				Nacmierz	Postomino	Sławno
Natztow	Belgard				Nasutowo	Białogard	Białogard
Naugard	Kolberg-Körlin				Nowogardek	Kolobrzeg	Kołobrzeg
Naulin	Pyritz				Nowielin	Pyrzyce	Pyrzyce
Nawitz	Lauenburg				Nawcz	Łęczyce	Wejherowo
Neblin	Neustettin				Nobliny	Borne Sulinowo	Szczecinek
Necknin	Kolberg-Körlin				Niekanin	Kolobrzeg	Kołobrzeg
Nedlin	Köslin				Niedalino	Swieszyno	Koszalin
Neeberg	Usedom-Wollin	Krummin	Am Peenestrom	Ost-vorpommern			
Negast	Franzburg-Barth	Samtens	West-Rügen	Rügen			
Nehmer	Kolberg-Körlin				Niemierze	Siemysl	Kołobrzeg
Neitzkow	Stolp				Nieckowo	Potegowo	Słupsk
Nelep	Belgard				Nielep	Rabino	Świdwin
Nemischhof	Arnswalde				Niemiensko	Drawno	Choszczno
Nemitz	Cammin				Niemica	Golczewo	Kamień
Nemitz	Schlawe				Niemica	Malechowo	Sławno
Nemmin	Belgard				Niemierzyno	Świdwin	Świdwin
Nemmin	Neustettin				Uniemino	Borne Sulinowo	Szczecinek
Neppermin	Usedom-Wollin	Benz	Usedom-Süd	Ost-vorpommern			
Nesekow	Stolp				Niestkowo	Ustka	Słupsk
Nessin	Kolberg-Körlin				Niezyn	Siemysl	Kołobrzeg
Nest	Köslin				Unieście	Mielno	Koszalin
Netzbruch	Friedeberg				Przynotecko	Stare Kurowo	Strzelce Krajenskie-Drezdenko
Neu Anspach	Friedeberg				Niegoslaw	Gmina Drezdenko	Strzelce Krajenskie-Drezdenko
Neu Banzin	Köslin				Będzinko	Będzino	Koszalin
Neu Battrow	Flatow				Batorówko	Lipka	Zlotów
Neubauhof	Franzburg-Barth	Franzburg	Franzburg-Richtenberg	Vorpommern-Rügen			
Neu Behle	Netzekreis				Bialczyn	(Ort nicht auffindbar)	
Neu Bewersdorf	Schlawe				Bobrowiczki	Sławno	Sławno
Neubork	Kolberg-Körlin				Nowy Borek	Kolobrzeg	Kołobrzeg
Neu Buckow	Belgard				Bukówko	Tychowo	Białogard
Neu Butzig	Flatow				Nowy Buczek	Lipka	Zlotów
Neu Damerow	Saatzig				Nowa Dabrowa	Stara Dabrowa	Stargardzki Szczecinski
Neu Damerow	Stolp				Nowa Dabrowa	Potegowo	Słupsk
Neu Dessau	Friedeberg				Kosin	Gmina Drezdenko	Strzelce Krajenskie-Drezdenko
Neudorf	Köslin				Lozice	Gmina Bobolice	Koszalin
Neudorf	Netzekreis				Nowa Wies	Trzcianka	Czarnków-Trzcianka
Neudorf	Neustettin				Prosinko	Czaplinek	Drawsko
Neu Draheim	Neustettin				Nowe Drawsko	Czaplinek	Drawsko
Neuendorf	Bütow				Nowa Wies	Parchowo	Bytów
Neuendorf	Franzburg-Barth	Saal	Barth	Vorpommern-Rügen			
Neuendorf	Greifen-hagen				Piaseczno	Banie	Gryfino
Neuendorf	Grimmen	Süderholz	(amtsfrei)	Vorpommern-Rügen			
Neuendorf	Lauenburg				Nowa Wieś Lęborska	Nowa Wieś Lęborska	Lębork
Neuendorf	Naugard				Jaroslawki	Maszewo	Goleniów
Neuendorf	Usedom-Wollin				Wiselka	Wolin	Kamień
Neuen-hagen	Köslin				Dobieslawiec	Będzino	Koszalin
Neuen-hagen	Regenwalde				Czarne	Ploty	Gryfice
Neuen-hagen, Abtei	Schlawe				Jezyczki	Darlowo	Sławno
Neuen-hagen, Amt	Schlawe				Jezierzany	Postomino	Sławno
Neuen-kirchen	Rügen	Neuen-kirchen	West-Rügen	Rügen			
Neuen-kirchen	Uecker-münde				Doluje	Dobra	Police
Neuen-kruger; Revier	Uecker-münde	Viereck	Uecker-Randow-Tal	Uecker-Randow			
Neu Erbach	Friedeberg				Kawczyn	Drawsko	Czarnków-Trzcianka
Neu; Falkenberg	Pyritz				Chabówko	Bielice	Pyrzyce
Neufeld	Rummels-burg				Zagony	Kolczyglowy	Bytów
Neugönne	Neustettin				Nowe Gonne	Szczecinek	Szczecinek
Neugolz	Deutsch Krone				Golce	Wałcz	Wałcz
Neu Grappe	Pyritz				Nowe Chrapowo	Bielice	Pyrzyce
Neu Griebnitz	Köslin				Grzybniczka	Manowo	Koszalin
Neu Grunau	Flatow				Nowe Gronowo	Debrzno	Czluchów
Neu Gurkowsch-bruch	Friedeberg				Górczyna	Zwierzyn	Strzelce Krajenskie-Drezdenko
Neuguth	Schlochau				Nowa Wies Czluchowska	Przechlewo	Czluchów
Neu Gutzmerow	Stolp				Choćmirówko	Glówczyce	Słupsk
Neuhöfen	Netzekreis				Nowe Dwory	Wieleń	Czarnków-Trzcianka
Neuhof	Deutsch Krone				Nowy Dwór	Szydlowo	Piła
Neuhof	Dramburg				Bedlino	Wierzchowo	Drawsko
Neuhof	Flatow				Nowy Dwór	Zlotów	Zlotów
Neuhof	Lauenburg				Nowecin	Wicko	Lebork
Neuhof	Regenwalde				Orzeszkowo	Resko	Lobez
Neuhof	Schlochau				Garbek	Przechlewo	Czluchów
Neuhof	Usedom-Wollin	Heringsdorf	(amtsfrei)	Ost-vorpommern			
Neuhütten	Bütow				Nowe Huty	Tuchomie	Bytów
Neu Järshagen	Schlawe				Nowy Jarosław	Darlowo	Sławno
Neu Jugelow	Stolp				Gogolewko	Dębnica Kaszubska	Słupsk
Neukarbe	Friedeberg				Nowe Kurowo	Stare Kurowo	Strzelce Krajenskie-Drezdenko
Neu Kentzlin	Demmin	Kentzlin	Demmin-Land	Demmin			
Neukirchen	Regenwalde				Belczna	Lobez	Lobez
Neuklenz	Köslin				Nieklonice	Swieszyno	Koszalin
Neu Klücken	Arnswalde				Nowy Klukom	Krzecin	Choszczno
Neu Kolziglow	Rummels-burg				Kolczy-glówki	Kolczy-glowy	Bytów
Neu Koprieben	Neustettin				Nowe Koprzywno	Barwice	Szczecinek
Neu Kuddezow	Schlawe				Chudaczewko	Postomino	Sławno
Neu Kugelwitz	Schlawe				Kowale-wiczki	Darlowo	Sławno
Neu Laatzig	Dramburg				Nowe Laski	Wierzchowo	Drawsko
Neu Langkafel	Naugard				Krasnoleka	Nowogard	Goleniów
Neu Lebehnke	Deutsch Krone				Nowa Lubianka	Szydlowo	Piła
Neu Liepenfier	Neustettin				Lipno	Polczyn Zdrój	Świdwin
Neu Lülfitz	Belgard				Lulewiczki	Białogard	Białogard
Neumark	Greifen-hagen				Stare Czarnowo	Stare Czarnowo	Gryfino
Neu Massow	Naugard				Maszewko	Maszewo	Goleniów
Neu Mecklenburg	Friedeberg				Zwierzyn	Zwierzyn	Strzelce-Drezdenko
Neu Natelfitz	Regenwalde				Natolewiczki	Ploty	Gryfice
Neu Paalow	Schlawe				Pałówko	Postomino	Sławno
Neu Prilipp	Pyritz				Nowy Przylep	Warnice	Pyrzyce
Neurakitt	Stolp				Rokiciny	Czarna Dąbrówka	Bytów
Neu Reddevitz	Rügen	Lancken-Granitz	Mönchgut-Granitz	Rügen			
Neurese	Kolberg-Körlin				Unieradz	Siemysl	Kołobrzeg
Neu Sanskow	Belgard				Zajączkówko	Polczyn Zdrój	Świdwin
Neusarnow	Cammin				Żarnówko	Stepnica	Goleniów
Neu Schönwalde	Regenwalde				Zagozd	Drawsko Pomorskie	Drawsko
Neu Stüdnitz	Arnswalde				Nowa Studnica	Tuczno	Wałcz
Neuteich	Friedeberg				Chelst	Drawsko	Czarnków-Trzcianka
Neu Tellin	Demmin	Alt Tellin	Jarmen-Tutow	Demmin			
Neu Tramm	Kolberg-Körlin				Stramniczka	Dygowo	Kołobrzeg
Neu Ulm	Friedeberg				Osów	Gmina Drezdenko	Strzelce Krajenskie-Drezdenko
Neu Valm	Neustettin				Nowy Chwalim	Barwice	Szczecinek
Neu Warschow	Schlawe				Warszkówko	Sławno	Sławno
Neuwasser	Schlawe				Dabki	Darlowo	Sławno
Neu Werder	Kolberg-Körlin				Korzyscienko	Kolobrzeg	Kołobrzeg
Neu Wuhrow	Neustettin				Nowe Worowo	Ostrowice	Drawsko
Neu Zarnow	Greifen-hagen				Nowe Czarnowo	Gryfino	Gryfino
Neu Zippnow	Deutsch Krone				Sypniewko	Jastrowie	Zlotów
Neu Zowen	Schlawe				Sowinko	Polanów	Koszalin
Neverow	Usedom-Wollin	Dargen	Usedom-Süd	Ost-vorpommern			
Niederhagen	Regenwalde				Lubien Dolny	Resko	Lobez
Niekosken	Netzekreis				Niekursko	Trzcianka	Czarnków-Trzcianka
Niepars	Franzburg-Barth	Niepars	Niepars	Vorpommern-Rügen			
Niesewanz	Schlochau				Niezywiec	Czluchów	Czluchów
Ninikow	Greifenberg				Ninikowo	Karnice	Gryfice
Nipperwiese	Greifen-hagen				Ognica	Widuchowa	Gryfino
Nippoglense	Stolp				Niepogledzie	Debnica Kaszubska	Słupsk
Nitzlin	Schlawe				Nosalin	Postomino	Sławno
Nitznow	Cammin				Niczonów	Karnice	Gryfice
Nossendorf	Grimmen	Nossendorf	Demmin-Land	Demmin			
Notzkow	Schlawe				Noskowo	Sławno	Sławno
Nuthagen	Dramburg				Netno	Drawsko Pomorskie	Drawsko
Oberhof	Naugard				Pucice	Goleniów	Goleniów
Oebelitz	Franzburg-Barth	Millienhagen-Oebelitz	Franzburg-Richtenberg	Vorpommern-Rügen			
Oie	Greifswald	Kröslin	Lubmin	Ost-vorpommern			
Ornshagen	Regenwalde				Zerzyno	Resko	Lobez
Osseck	Lauenburg				Osiek	Linia	Wejherowo
Osterfelde	Neustettin				Ostropole	Barwice	Szczecinek
Paatzig	Cammin				Piaski Wielkie	Wolin	Kamień
Paatzig	Regenwalde				Piaski	Resko	Łobez
Pagdanzig	Schlochau				Pakotulsko	Przechlewo	Człuchów
Pagelkau	Schlochau				Pawlówko	Przechlewo	Człuchów
Pagenkopf	Naugard				Bagna	Maszewo	Goleniów
Pakulent	Greifen-hagen				Pacholęta	Widuchowa	Gryfino
Palzwitz	Schlawe				Palczewice	Gmina Darłowo	Sławno
Pammin	Arnswalde				Pomień	Recz	Choszczno
Pammin	Dramburg				Pomierzyn	Kalisz Pomorski	Drawsko
Pampow	Uecker-münde	Blankensee	Löcknitz-Penkun	Uecker-Randow			
Panknin	Schlawe				Pękanino	Malechowo	Sławno
Pansin	Saatzig				Pęzino	Stargard Szczeciński	Stardgard Szczeciński
Pantelitz	Franzburg-Barth	Pantelitz	Niepars	Vorpommern-Rügen			
Panzerin	Belgard				Pęczerzyno	Brzeżno	Świdwin
Papen-hagen	Franzburg-Barth	Richtenberg	Franzburg-Richtenberg	Vorpommern-Rügen			
Papenhagen	Grimmen	Papen-hagen	Franzburg-Richtenberg	Vorpommern-Rügen			
Papenzin	Rummels-burg				Bobięcino	Miastko	Bytów
Parchtitz	Rügen	Parchtitz	Bergen auf Rügen	Rügen			
Paretz	Lauenburg				Paraszyno	Łęczyce	Wejherowo
Pargow	Greifen-hagen				Pargowo	Kołbaskowo	Police
Parlin	Naugard				Parlino	Stara Dąbrowa	Stargard
Parnow	Köslin				Parnowo	Biesiekierz	Koszalin
Parpart	Greifenberg				Paprotno	Karnice	Gryfice
Parpart	Schlawe				Paproty	Malechowo	Sławno
Parsow	Köslin				Parsowo	Biesiekierz	Koszalin
Paske	Usedom-Wollin	Usedom	Usedom-Süd	Ost-vorpommern			
Patzig	Rügen	Patzig	Bergen auf Rügen	Rügen			
Patzig	Neustettin				Piaski	Barwice	Szczecinek
Paulsdorf	Cammin				Skoszewo	Wolin	Kamień
Peeselin	Demmin	Hohenmocker	Demmin-Land	Demmin			
Peest	Schlawe				Pieszcz	Postomino	Sławno
Pegelow	Saatzig				Gogolewo	Marianowo	Stargard
Pehlitz	Friedeberg				Pielice	Strzelce Krajeńskie	Strzelce-Drezdenko
Pelsin	Anklam	Pelsin	Anklam-Land	Ost-vorpommern			
Penkuhl	Schlochau				Pieniężnica	Rzeczenica	Człuchów
Pennekow	Schlawe				Pieńkowo	Postomino	Sławno
Pensin	Demmin	Kletzin	Demmin-Land	Demmin			
Pentz	Demmin	Borrentin	Demmin-Land	Demmin			
Perlin	Lauenburg				Perlino	Gniewino	Wejherowo
Persanzig	Neustettin				Parsęcko	Szczecinek	Szczecinek
Peterfitz	Kolberg-Körlin				Piotrowice	Dygowo	Kołobrzeg
Petersdorf	Bütow				Mokrzyn	Bytów	Bytów
Petersfelde	Kolberg-Körlin				Poradz	Sławoborze	Świdwin
Petershagen	Greifen-hagen	Casekow	Gartz (Oder)	Uckermark			
Petershagen	Kolberg-Körlin				Powalice	Sławoborze	Świdwin
Petershagen	Schlawe				Pęciszewko	Gmina Darłowo	Sławno
Peterswalde	Schlochau				Cierznie	Debrzno	Człuchów
Petzin	Flatow				Zalesie	Złotów	Złotów
Petznick	Deutsch Krone				Piecnik	Mirosławiec	Wałcz
Petznick	Pyritz				Piasecznik	Choszczno	Choszczno
Pflugrade	Naugard				Redło	Osina	Goleniów
Pielburg	Neustettin				Pile	Borne Sulinowo	Szczecinek
Piepenburg	Regenwalde				Wyszogóra	Gmina Płoty	Gryfice County
Piepenhagen	Regenwalde				Przyborze	Łobez	Łobez
Piepstock	Regenwalde				Podlipce	Węgorzyno	Łobez
Pinnow	Greifen-hagen	Hohen-selchow-Groß Pinnow	Gartz (Oder)	Uckermark			
Pinnow	Regenwalde				Pniewo	Płoty	Gryfice
Pinnow	Neustettin				Pniewo	Okonek	Złotów
Pirbstow	Schlawe				Przystawy	Malechowo	Sławno
Plagow	Arnswalde				Pławno	Bierzwnik	Choszczno
Plantikow	Naugard				Błądkowo	Dobra	Łobez
Plassenberg (bis 1937 = Wendisch Plassow)	Stolp				Płaszewo	Kobylnica	Słupsk
Plassow	Stolp				Płaszewko	Słupsk	Słupsk
Platenheim	Bütow				Płotowo	Bytów	Bytów
Platzig	Schlochau				Płaszczyca	Przechlewo	Człuchów
Plestlin	Demmin	Bentzin	Jarmen-Tutow	Demmin			
Plietnitz	Deutsch Krone				Płytnica	Tarnówka	Złotów
Plönzig	Pyritz				Płońsko	Przelewice	Pyrzyce
Plötz	Demmin	Jarmen	Jarmen-Tutow	Demmin			
Plötzig	Rummels-burg				Płocko	Kępice	Słupsk
Plötzin	Usedom-Wollin				Płocin	Wolin	Kamień
Plötzmin	Deutsch Krone				Plecemin	Tarnówka	Złotów
Plöwen	Uecker-münde	Plöwen	Löcknitz-Penkun	Uecker-Randow			
Plümenhagen	Köslin				Gniazdowo	Biesiekierz	Koszalin
Pobanz	Köslin				Pobądz	Tychowo	Białogard
Poberow	Cammin				Pobierowo	Rewal	Gryfice
Poberow	Rummels-burg				Poborowo	Trzebielino	Bytów
(Groß); Pobloth	Kolberg-Körlin				Pobłocie Wielkie	Karlino	Białogard
Poblotz	Stolp				Pobłocie	Główczyce	Słupsk
Podewils	Belgard				Podwilcze	Białogard	Białogard
Podewils-hausen	Stolp				Podwilczyn	Dębnica Kaszubska	Słupsk
Podrusen (1927-1945 = Preußenfeld)	Flatow				Podróżna	Krajenka	Złotów
Pöhlen	Neustettin				Polne	Barwice	Szczecinek
Poganitz	Stolp				Poganice	Potęgowo	Słupsk
Poggendorf	Grimmen	Süderholz	(amtsfrei)	Vorpommern-Rügen			
Polchlep	Belgard				Półchleb	Świdwin	Świdwin
Polchow	Cammin				Połchowo	Kamień Pomorski	Kamień
Polchow	Regenwalde				Połchowo	Węgorzyno	Łobez
Poldemin	Kolberg-Körlin				Połomino	Dygowo	Kołobrzeg
Pollnitz	Schlochau				Polnica	Człuchów	Człuchów
Pomellen	Greifen-hagen	Nadrensee	Löcknitz-Penkun	Uecker-Randow			
Poplow	Belgard				Popielewo	Połczyn Zdrój	Świdwin
Poppen-hagen	Köslin				Popowo	Będzino	Koszalin
Poppow	Lauenburg				Popowo	Cewice	Lębork
Porst	Köslin				Porost	Gmina Bobolice	Koszalin
Posenberg	Flatow				Drozdowo	Debrzno	Czluchów
Poseritz	Rügen	Poseritz	Bergen auf Rügen	Rügen			
Pottangow	Stolp				Potęgowo	Potęgowo	Słupsk
Pottlitz	Flatow				Potulice	Lipka	Złotów
Prätenow	Usedom-Wollin	Dargen	Usedom-Süd	Ost-vorpommern			
Prechlau	Schlochau				Przechlewo	Przechlewo	Czlłuchów
Prechlauer-mühl	Schlochau				Przechlewko	Przechlewo	Człuchów
Preetz	Franzburg-Barth	Preetz	Altenpleen	Vorpommern-Rügen			
Preetz	Schlawe				Porzecze	Gmina Darłowo	Sławno
Prellwitz	Deutsch Krone				Przelewice	Człopa	Wałcz
Premslaff	Regenwalde				Przemysław	Resko	Łobez
Prerow	Franzburg-Barth	Prerow	Darß/Fischland	Vorpommern-Rügen			
Preußendorf	Deutsch Krone				Prusinowo Wałeckie	Wałcz	Wałcz
Preußenfeld (bis 1927 = Podrusen)	Flatow				Podróżna	Krajenka	Złotów
Pribbernow	Cammin				Przybiernów	Przybiernów	Goleniów
Pribslaff	Belgard				Stary Przybysław	Świdwin	Świdwin
Priem-hausen	Naugard				Przemocze	Maszewo	Goleniów
Prillwitz	Pyritz				Przelewice	Przelewice	Pyrzyce
Pripsleben	Demmin	Pripsleben	Treptower Tollensewinkel	Demmin			
Pritten	Dramburg				Przytoń	Ostrowice	Drawsko
Pritter	Usedom-Wollin				Przytór	Świnoujście	(kreisfrei)
Pritzenow	Demmin	Bartow	Treptower Tollensewinkel	Demmin			
Pritzig	Rummels-burg				Przytocki	Kępice	Słupsk
Proch	Flatow				Prochy	Zakrzewo	Złotów
Prochnow	Deutsch Krone				Próchnowo	Mirosławiec	Wałcz
Prössin	Neustettin				Prosino	Czaplinek	Drawsko
Prohn	Franzburg-Barth	Prohn	Altenpleen	Vorpommern-Rügen			
Pruchten	Franzburg-Barth	Pruchten	Barth	Vorpommern-Rügen			
Prüssau	Lauenburg				Prusewo	Krokowa	Puck
Prützen-walde	Schlochau				Prusinowo	Debrzno	Człuchów
Prütznow	Regenwalde				Prusinowo	Łobez	Łobez
Prust	Greifenberg				Pruszcz	Brojce	Gryfice
Pudagla	Usedom-Wollin	Pudagla	Usedom-Süd	Ost-vorpommern			
Puddems-dorf	Köslin				Podamirowo	Będzino	Koszalin
Puddenzig	Naugard				Podańsko	Goleniów	Goleniów
Puddiger (bis 1937 = Wendisch Puddiger)	Rummels-burg				Podgóry	Kępice	Słupsk
Püstow	Rummels-burg				Pustowo	Kępice	Słupsk
Pütte	Franzburg-Barth	Pantelitz	Niepars	Vorpommern-Rügen			
Pützerlin	Saatzig				Poczernin	Stargard Szczeciński	Stargard
Pumlow	Belgard				Pomianowo	Białogard	Białogard
Pumptow	Pyritz				Pomietów	Dolice	Stargard
Pusitz	Lauenburg				Pużyce	Łęczyce	Wejherowo
Pustamin	Schlawe				Postomino	Postomino	Sławno
Pustchow	Belgard				Pustkowo	Białogard	Białogard
Pustchow	Greifenberg				Pustkowo	Rewal	Gryfice
Pustow	Grimmen	Sassen-Trantow	Peenetal/Loitz	Demmin			
Putbus	Rügen	Putbus	(amtsfrei)	Rügen			
Putgarten	Rügen	Putgarten	Nord-Rügen	Rügen			
Puttkamer-hof (bis 1937 = Niemietzke)	Stolp				Podkomorzyce	Czarna Dąbrówka	Bytów
Putzig	Netzekreis				Jędrzejewo	Czarnków	Czarnków-Trzcianka
Putzig-hauland	Netzekreis				Gajewo	Czarnków	Czarnków-Trzcianka
Quackenburg	Stolp				Kwakowo	Kobylnica	Słupsk
Quäsdow	Schlawe				Gwiazdowo	Sławno	Sławno
Quatzow	Schlawe				Kwasowo	Sławno	Sławno
Quilitz	Usedom-Wollin	Rankwitz	Usedom-Süd	Ostvorpommern			
Quilow	Greifswald	Groß Polzin	Züssow	Ostvorpommern			
Quiram	Deutsch Krone				Chwiram	Wałcz	Wałcz
Quisbernow	Belgard				Biernów	Rąbino	Świdwin
Raakow	Arnswalde				Rakowo	Krzęcin	Choszczno
Rabuhn	Kolberg-Körlin				Robuń	Gościno	Kołobrzeg
Rackitt	Cammin				Rokita	Przybiernów	Goleniów
Rackitt	Pyritz				Rokity	Kozielice	Pyrzyce
Rackow	Neustettin				Rakowo	Borne Sulinowo	Szczecinek
Radawnitz	Flatow				Radawnica	Złotów	Złótów
Raddack	Cammin				Radawka	Kamień Pomorski	Kamień
Raddatz	Neustettin				Radacz	Borne Sulinowo	Szczecinek
Radensfelde (until 1928 = Tschebiatkow)	Bütow				Trzebiatkowa	Tuchomie	Bytów
Radolin	Netzekreis				Radolin	Trzcianka	Czarnków-Trzcianka
Radosiew	Netzekreis				Radosiew	Czarnków	Czarnków-Trzcianka
Radun	Arnswalde				Raduń	Choszczno	Choszczno
Rahnwerder	Saatzig				Pełkinica (nicht mehr existent)		
Rakow	Grimmen	Süderholz	(amtsfrei)	Vorpommern-Rügen			
Ralswiek	Rügen	Ralswiek	Bergen auf Rügen	Rügen			
Rambin	Rügen	Rambin	West-Rügen	Rügen			
Ramelow	Kolberg-Körlin				Ramlewo	Gościno	Kołobrzeg
Ramin	Uecker-münde	Ramin	Löcknitz-Penkun	Uecker-Randow			
Ramnitz (until 1937 = Wend-isch Karstnitz)	Stolp				Karznica	Potęgowo	Słupsk
Ramsberg	Cammin				Strzeżewko	Kamień Pomorski	Kamień
Rankwitz	Usedom-Wollin	Rankwitz	Usedom-Süd	Ost-vorpommern			
Rappin	Rügen	Rappin	Bergen auf Rügen	Rügen			
Rarfin	Belgard				Rarwino	Białogard	Białogard
Rarvin	Cammin				Rarwino	Kamień Pomorski	Kamień
Raths-damnitz	Stolp				Dębnica Kaszubska	Dębnica Kaszubska	Słupsk
Ratteick	Schlawe				Ratajki	Sianów	Koszalin
Rauschen-dorf	Lauenburg				Czymanowo	Gniewino	Wejherowo
Ravenhorst	Cammin				Wołowiec	Golczewo	Kamień
Ravensberg	Neustettin				Żelisławie	Czaplinek	Drawsko
Ravenstein	Saatzig				Wapnica	Suchań	Stargard
Reblin (Alt Reblin)	Schlawe				Reblino	Kobylnica	Słupsk
Reckow	Bütow				Rekowo	Bytów	Bytów
Reckow	Cammin				Rekowo	Kamień Pomorski	Kamień
Reckow	Greifen-hagen				Rekowo	Kobylanka	Stargard
Reckow	Köslin				Rekowo	Polanów	Koszalin
Reckow	Lauenburg				Rekowo Lęborskie	Nowa Wieś Lęborska	Lębork
Reckow	Regenwalde				Rekowo	Radowo Małe	Łobez
Reckow	Usedom-Wollin				Rekowo	Wolin	Kamień
Reddentin	Schlawe				Redęcin	Słupsk	Słupsk
Redebas	Franzburg-Barth	Löbnitz	Barth	Vorpommern-Rügen			
Redel	Belgard				Redło	Połczyn Zdrój	Świdwin
Rederitz	Deutsch Krone				Nadarzyce	Jastrowie	Złotów
Redlin	Belgard				Redlino	Białogard	Białogard
Redlinsfelde (until 1936 = Aschersruhe)	Cammin				Redliny	Świerzno	Kamień
Reestow	Usedom-Wollin	Rankwitz	Usedom-Süd	Ost-vorpommern			
Reetz	Arnswalde				Recz	Recz	Choszczno
Reetz	Rummels-burg				Rzeczyca Wielka	Polanów	Koszalin
Reetzow	Usedom-Wollin	Benz	Usedom-Süd	Ost-vorpommern			
Regenthin	Arnswalde				Rądecin	Dobiegniew	Strzelce-Drezdenko
Rehberg	Usedom-Wollin				Ładzin	Wolin	Kamień
Rehwinkel	Saatzig				Lutkowo	Dobrzany	Stargard
Reichen-bach	Pyritz				Radaczewo	Choszczno	Choszczno
Reierort	Arnswalde				Starzyce	Bierzwnik	Choszczno
Reinberg	Demmin	Wolde	Treptower Tollensewinkel	Demmin			
Reinberg	Grimmen	Reinberg	Miltzow	Vorpommern-Rügen			
Reinfeld	Belgard				Bierzwnica	Świdwin	Świdwin
Reinfeld	Rummels-burg				Barnowiec	Kołczygłowy	Bytów
Reinfeld-Hammer	Rummels-burg				Słosinko	Miastko	Bytów
Reinken-hagen	Grimmen	Miltzow	Miltzow	Vorpommern-Rügen			
Reinwasser	Rummels-burg				Piaszczyna	Miastko	Bytów
Reitz	Stolp				Redzikowo	Słupsk	Słupsk
Rekentin	Grimmen	Tribsees	Recknitz-Trebeltal	Vorpommern-Rügen			
Rensekow	Greifenberg				Rzęskowo	Gryfice	Gryfice
Rensin	Greifenberg				Rzęsin	Gryfice	Gryfice
Repenow	Pyritz				Rzepnowo	Pyrzyce	Pyrzyce
Repkow	Köslin				Rzepkowo	Sianów	Koszalin
Reppin	Pyritz				Rzeplino	Dolice	Stargard
Reppow	Neustettin				Rzepowo	Czaplinek	Szczecinek
Repzin	Belgard				Rzepczyno	Brzeżno	Świdwin
Resehl	Naugard				Radzanek	Maszewo	Goleniów
Reselkow	Kolberg-Körlin				Rzesznikowo	Rymań	Kołobrzeg
Rettkewitz	Lauenburg				Redkowice	Nowa Wieś Lęborska	Lębork
Retzin	Belgard				Rzecino	Rąbino	Świdwin
Retzin	Uecker-münde	Ramin	Löcknitz-Penkun	Uecker-Randow			
Retzows-felde	Greifen-hagen				Radziszewo	Gryfino	Gryfino
Retztow	Naugard				Redostowo	Osina	Goleniów
Revenow	Cammin				Rzewnowo	Kamień Pomorski	Kamień
Rewahl	Greifenberg				Rewal	Rewal	Gryfice
Rexin	Stolp				Rzechcino	Potęgowo	Słupsk
Ribbekardt	Greifenberg				Rybokarty	Gryfice	Gryfice
Ribbertow	Cammin				Rozwarowo	Kamień Pomorski	Kamień
Richenwalde	Schlochau				Zalesie	Rzeczenica	Człuchów
Richnau	Schlochau				Rychnowy	Człuchów	Człuchów
Rieben	Lauenburg				Rybno	Gniewino	Wejherowo
Riebnitz	Cammin				Rybice	Świerzno	Kamień
Riege	Deutsch Krone				Leżenica	Szydłowo	Piła
Rienow	Regenwalde				Rynowo	Łobez	Łobez
Rieth	Uecker-münde	Luckow	Am Stettiner Haff	Uecker-Randow			
Rietzig	Arnswalde				Rzecko	Choszczno	Choszczno
Rißnow	Cammin				Rzystnowo	Przybiernów	Goleniów
Ristow	Belgard				Rzyszczewo	Białogard	Białogard
Ristow	Schlawe				Rzyszczewo	Sławno	Sławno
Rittersberg	Schlochau				Grodzisko	Rzeczenica	Człuchów
Ritzig	Belgard				Nowe Resko	Połczyn Zdrój	Świdwin
Ritzow	Stolp				Słupsk-Ryczewo	Słupsk	(kreisfrei)
Robe	Greifenberg				Roby	Trzebiatów	Gryfice
Rodde	Grimmen	Grammen-dorf	Recknitz-Trebeltal	Vorpommern-Rügen			
Roden	Stolp				Niemczewo	Dębnica Kaszubska	Słupsk
Roderbeck	Greifen-hagen				Rynica	Widuchowa	Gryfino
Röhlshof	Belgard				Role	Rąbino	Świdwin
Rörchen	Greifen-hagen				Rurka	Chojna	Gryfino
Röstenberg	Arnswalde				Rościn	Drawno	Choszczno
Rötzen-hagen	Schlawe				Boleszewo	Sławno	Sławno
Roggatz	Stolp				Rogawica	Słupsk	Słupsk
Roggow	Belgard				Rogowo	Białogard	Białogard
Roggow A	Regenwalde				Rogowo	Radowo Małe	Łobez
Roggow B	Regenwalde				Rogówko	Węgorzyno	Łobez
Roggow	Saatzig				Rogowo	Stargard Szczeciński	Stargard
Rogzow	Köslin				Koszalin-Rokosowo	Koszalin	(kreisfrei)
Rogzow	Kolberg-Körlin				Rokosowo	Sławoborze	Świdwin
Rohr	Rummels-burg				Trzcinno	Miastko	Bytów
Rohrbeck	Arnswalde				Kołki	Choszczno	Choszczno
Rohrsdorf	Friedeberg				Ostrowiec	Dobiegniew	Strzelce-Drezdenko
Rohrsdorf	Greifen-hagen				Parnica	Banie	Gryfino
Roman	Kolberg-Körlin				Rymań	Rymań	Kołobrzeg
Roschütz	Lauenburg				Roszczyce	Wicko	Lębork
Rose	Deutsch Krone				Róża Wielka	Szydłowo	Piła
Rose-marsow	Demmin	Alten-treptow	Treptower Tollensewinkel	Demmin			
Rosenfelde	Deutsch Krone				Różewo	Szydłowo	Piła
Rosenfelde	Greifen-hagen				Rożnowo	Banie	Gryfino
Rosenfelde	Pyritz				Rosiny	Przelewice	Pyrzyce
Rosenfelde	Regenwalde				Brzeźniak	Węgorzyno	Łobez
Rosenfelde	Schlochau				Rozwory	Debrzno	Człuchów
Rosenow	Naugard				Rożnowo Nowo-gardzkie	Maszewo	Goleniów
Rosenow	Regenwalde				Rożnowo Łobeski	Łobez	Łobez
Roslasin	Lauenburg				Rozłasino	Lęczyce	Wejherowo
Rosow	Greifen-hagen	Mescherin	Gartz (Oder)	Uckermark			
Rossenthin	Kolberg-Körlin				Rościęcino	Kołobrzeg	Kołobrzeg
Roßnow	Köslin				Rosnowo	Manowo	Koszalin
Rossow	Saatzig				Rosowo	Stara Dąbrowa	Stargard
Rostin	Belgard				Rościno	Białogard	Białogard
Rothemühl	Uecker-münde	Rothemühl	Torgelow-Ferdinandshof	Uecker-Randow			
Rothenburg	Uecker-münde	Krugsdorf	Uecker-Randow-Tal	Uecker-Randow			
Rothenfier	Naugard				Czermnica	Nowogard	Goleniów
Rothen-klempenow	Uecker-münde	Rothen-klempenow	Löcknitz-Penkun	Uecker-Randow			
Rotten	Stolp				Retowo	Smołdzino	Słupsk
Rottnow	Greifenberg				Rotnowo	Gryfice	Gryfice
Rotzog	Schlawe				Rosocha	Polanów	Koszalin
Rowe	Stolp				Rowy	Ustka	Słupsk
Rowen	Stolp				Równo	Główczyce	Słupsk
Rubkow	Greifswald	Rubkow	Züssow	Ost-vorpommern			
Ruden	Flatow				Rudna	Złotów	Złotów
Ruden	Greifswald	Kröslin	Lubmin	Ost-vorpommern			
Rudolfs-walde	Bütow				Osława Dąbrowa	Studzienice	Bytów
Rützen-hagen	Belgard				Rusinowo	Świdwin	Świdwin
Rützen-hagen	Schlawe				Rusinowo	Postomino	Sławno
Rütznow	Greifenberg				Prusinowo	Gryfice	Gryfice
Rützow	Dramburg				Rydzewo	Drawsko Pomorskie	Drawsko
Rützow	Kolberg-Körlin				Rusowo	Ustronie Morskie	Kołobrzeg
Rüwolsdorf	Kolberg-Körlin				Ubysławice	Karlino	Białogard
Ruhnow	Regenwalde				Runowo	Węgorzyno	Łobez
Rumbske	Stolp				Rumsko	Główczyce	Słupsk
Runau	Netzekreis				Runowo	Trzcianka	Czarnków-Trzcianka
Ruschen-dorf	Deutsch Krone				Rusinowo	Wałcz	Wałcz
Ruschütz	Stolp				Rzuszcze	Główczyce	Słupsk
Rußhagen	Schlawe				Rusko	Gmina Darłowo	Sławno
Ruthenberg	Schlochau				Raciniewo	Czarne	Człuchów
Saagen	Regenwalde				Zagórzyce	Łobez	Łobez
Saal	Franzburg-Barth	Saal	Barth	Vorpommern-Rügen			
Saarow	Saatzig				Żarowo	Stargard Szczeciński	Stargard
Saatel	Franzburg-Barth	Löbnitz	Barth	Vorpommern-Rügen			
Saatzig	Saatzig				Szadzko	Dobrzany	Stargard
Sabes	Pyritz				Zaborsko	Warnice	Pyrzyce
Sabessow	Cammin				Zabierzewo	Przybiernów	Goleníow
Sabow	Pyritz				Żabów	Pyrzyce	Pyrzyce
Sackshöhe	Schlawe				Zakrzewo	Gmina Darłowo	Sławno
Sagard	Rügen	Sagard	Nord-Rügen	Rügen			
Sagemühl	Deutsch Krone				Ostrowiec	Wałcz	Wałcz
Sager	Belgard				Zagórze	Białogard	Białogard
Sager	Cammin				Zagórze	Wolin	Kamień
Sageritz	Stolp				Zagórzyca	Damnica	Słupsk
Sakollnow	Flatow				Sokolna	Tarnówka	Złotów
Saleske	Stolp				Zaleskie	Ustka	Słupsk
Sallenthin	Usedom-Wollin	Heringsdorf	(amtsfrei)	Ost-vorpommern			
Sallentin	Pyritz				Żalęcino	Dolice	Stargard
Sallmow	Regenwalde				Żelmowo	Radowo Małe	Łobez
Salm	Deutsch Krone				Załom	Człopa	Wałcz
Salz-kossäthen	Friedeberg				Klesno	Gmina Drezdenko	Strzelce-Drezdenko
Sam-menthin	Arnswalde				Zamęcin	Choszczno	Choszczno
Sampohl	Schlochau				Sąpolno	Przechlewo	Człuchów
Samtens	Rügen	Samtens	West-Rügen	Rügen			
Sandförde	Uecker-münde	Jatznick	Uecker-Randow-Tal	Uecker-Randow			
Sandow	Pyritz				Sądów	Dolice	Stargard
Sanskow	Stolp				Zajączkowo	Kobylnica	Słupsk
Sanzkow	Demmin	Sieden-brünzow	Demmin-Land	Demmin			
Sarranzig	Dramburg				Zarańsko	Drawsko Pomorskie	Drawsko
Sarsen	Lauenburg				Sarbsk	Wicko	Lębork
Sassen	Grimmen	Sassen-Trantow	Peenetal/Loitz	Demmin			
Sassen-burg	Neustettin				Stare Wierzchowo	Szczecinek	Szczecinek
Sassen-burg	Saatzig				Chlebowo	Stara Dąbrowa	Stargard
Sassen-hagen	Saatzig				Chlebówko	Stara Dąbrowa	Stargard
Sassin	Lauenburg				Sasino	Choczewo	Wejherowo
Saßnitz	Rügen	Sassnitz	(amtsfrei)	Rügen			
Saulin	Lauenburg				Salino	Gniewino	Wejherowo
Saulinke	Lauenburg				Salinko	Gniewino	Wejherowo
Sauzin	Usedom-Wollin	Sauzin	Am Peenestrom	Ost-vorpommern			
See Buckow	Schlawe				Bukowo Morskie	Gmina Darłowo	Sławno
Seedorf (Grenzmark)	Flatow				Wersk	Zakrzewo	Złotów
Seedorf	Grimmen	Demmin-Seedorf	(amtsfrei)	Demmin			
Seedorf	Rügen	Sellin	Mönchgut-Granitz	Rügen			
Seefeld	Kolberg-Körlin				Ołużna	Gościno	Kołobrzeg
Seefeld	Saatzig				Grzędzice	Stargard Szczeciński	Stargard
Seefelde (bis 1938 = Buntowo)	Flatow				Buntowo	Złotów	Złotów
Seegen-felde	Deutsch Krone				Tarnowo	Szydłowo	Piła
Seegen-felde	Friedeberg				Żabicko	Strzelce Krajeńskie	Strzelce-Drezdenko
Seeger	Köslin				Zegrze Pomorskie	Świeszyno	Koszalin
Seehof	Rummels-burg				Łobzowo	Kołczygłowy	Bytów
Seelitz	Rummels-burg				Żelice	Kępice	Słupsk
Seelow	Greifen-hagen				Żelewo	Stare Czarnowo	Gryfino
See Suckow	Schlawe				Żukowo Morskie	Gmina Darłowo	Sławno
Segebadenhau	Grimmen	Horst	Miltzow	Vorpommern-Rügen			
Segenthin	Schlawe				Żegocino	Malechowo	Sławno
Sehlen	Rügen	Sehlen	Bergen auf Rügen	Rügen			
Seidel	Köslin				Wyszewo	Manowo	Koszalin
Selberg B	Rummels-burg				Nowy Żelibórz	Polanów	Koszalin
Selchow	Greifen-hagen				Żelechowo	Widuchowa	Gryfino
Selchow	Netzekreis				Żelichowo	Krzyż Wiel-kopolski	Czarnków-Trzcianka
Selchow-hammer	Netzekreis				Kuźnica Żelichowska	Krzyż Wiel-kolpolski	Czarnków-Trzcianka
Selesen	Stolp				Żelazo	Smołdzino	Słupsk
Sellberg	Schlawe				Stary Żelibórz	Polanów	Koszalin
Sellen	Schlawe				Zielnowo	Gmina Darłowo	Sławno
Sellin	Greifenberg				Zielin	Gryfice	Gryfice
Sellin	Rügen	Sellin	Mönchgut-Granitz	Rügen			
Sellin	Rummels-burg				Zielin	Trzebielino	Bytów
Sellin	Usedom-Wollin	Heringsdorf	(amtsfrei)	Ost-vorpommern			
Sellnow	Arnswalde				Zieleniewo	Bierzwnik	Choszczno
Sellnow	Kolberg-Körlin				Zieleniewo	Kołobrzeg	Kołobrzeg
Sellnow	Lauenburg				Zielnowo	Luzino	Wejherowo
Seltz	Demmin	Gültz	Treptower Tollensewinkel	Demmin			
Semerow	Belgard				Ząbrowo	Świdwin	Świdwin
Semlow	Franzburg-Barth	Semlow	Ribnitz-Damgarten	Vorpommern-Rügen			
Semmerow	Kolberg-Körlin				Ząbrowo	Gościno	Kołobrzeg
Semnitz	Schlochau				Ziemnica	(nicht auf-findbar)	
Sieden-bollentin	Demmin	Sieden-bollentin	Treptower Tollensewinkel	Demmin			
Sieden-brünzow	Demmin	Sieden-brünzow	Demmin-Land	Demmin			
Sieden-büssow	Demmin	Alt Tellin	Jarmen-Tutow	Demmin			
Siedkow	Belgard				Żytelkowo	Białogard	Białogard
Siemers-dorf	Grimmen	Tribsees	Recknitz-Trebeltal	Vorpommern-Rügen			
Sieverts-hagen	Grimmen	Papen-hagen	Franzburg-Richtenberg	Vorpommern-Rügen			
Silberberg	Arnswalde				Święcie-chów	Drawno	Choszczno
Silbersdorf-Wolters-dorf	Saatzig				Starzyce-Starzyn	Chociwel	Stargard
Silesen	Belgard				Żeleźno	Białogard	Białogard
Silligsdorf	Regenwalde				Sielsko	Węgorzyno	Łobez
Simmatzig	Belgard				Smardzko	Świdwin	Świdwin
Simötzel	Kolberg-Körlin				Siemyśl	Siemyśl	Kołobrzeg
Sinzlow	Greifen-hagen				Żelisławiec	Stare Czarnowo	Gryfino
Sochow	Stolp				Żochowo	Potęgowo	Słupsk
Söllnitz	Schlawe				Zielenica	Malechowo	Sławno
Soldemin	Usedom-Wollin				Sułomino	Wolin	Kamień
Soltikow	Schlawe				Sulechowo	Malechowo	Sławno
Soltin	Cammin				Żółcino	Kamień Pomorski	Kamień
Soltnitz	Neustettin				Żółtnica	Szczecinek	Szczecinek
Sommers-dorf	Demmin	Sommers-dorf	Demmin-Land	Demmin			
Sommers-dorf	Greifen-hagen	Penkun	Löcknitz-Penkun	Uecker-Randow			
Sommin	Bütow				Sominy	Studzienice	Bytów
Sonnen-berg	Uecker-münde	Grambow	Löcknitz-Penkun	Uecker-Randow			
Sonnen-walde (Czarndam-merow)	Bütow				Czarna Dąbrowa	Studzienice	Bytów
Sophien-berg	Netzekreis				Zofiowo	Czarnków	Czarnków-Trzcianka
Sophienhof	Arnswalde				Przybysław	Krzęcin	Choszczno
Sophienhof	Demmin	Loitz	Peenetal/Loitz	Demmin			
Sorchow	Stolp				Zoruchowo	Główczyce	Słupsk
Sorenbohm	Köslin				Sarbinowo	Mielno	Koszalin
Spaldings-felde	Greifen-hagen				Motaniec	Kobylanka	Stargard
Spantekow	Anklam	Spantekow	Anklam-Land	Ost-vorpommern			
Sparsee	Neustettin				Spore	Szczecinek	Szczecinek
Spechts-dorf	Arnswalde				Płociczno	Tuczno	Wałcz
Spechts-hagen	Lauenburg				Dzięcielec	Łęczyce	Wejherowo
Speck	Lauenburg				Gać	Główczyce	Słupsk
Speck	Naugard				Mosty	Goleniów	Goleniów
Spie	Kolberg-Körlin				Błotnica	Kołobrzeg	Kołobrzeg
Splietsdorf	Grimmen	Splietsdorf	Franzburg-Richtenberg	Vorpommern-Rügen			
Sprengers-felde	Uecker-münde	Ferdi-nandshof	Torgelow-Ferdinandshof	Uecker-Randow			
Springberg	Deutsch Krone				Zawada	Szydłowo	Piła
Suckow a.d.Plöne	Pyritz				Żuków	Przelewice	Pyrzyce
Suckow	Schlawe				Żukowo	Sławno	Sławno
Suckow	Usedom-Wollin	Rankwitz	Usedom-Süd	Ost-vorpommern			
Sukow a.d.Ihna	Saatzig				Żukowo	Suchań	Stargard
Swantow	Rügen	Poseritz	Bergen auf Rügen	Rügen			
Sydow	Schlawe				Żydowo	Polanów	Koszalin
Syringe	Arnswalde				Strumienno	Bierzwnik	Choszczno
Schaprode	Rügen	Schaprode	West-Rügen	Rügen			
Scharchow	Cammin				Skarchowo	Kamień Pomorski	Kamień
Scharnikau (bis 1937 = Deutsch Czarnikau)	Netzekreis				Czarnków	Czarnków	Czarnków-Trzcianka
Scharpenort	Neustettin				Ostroróg	Czaplinek	Szczecinek
Scharsow	Stolp				Skarszów Górny	Dębnica Kaszubska	Słupsk
Scheddin	Schlawe				Wszedzień	Postomino	Sławno
Schellin	Greifenberg				Skalin	Gryfice	Gryfice
Schellin	Pyritz				Skalin	Stargard Szczeciński	Stargard
Schierwens	Stolp				Czerwie-niec	Potęgowo	Słupsk
Schilde	Dramburg				Żółte	Drawsko Pomorskie	Drawsko
Schillers-dorf	Greifen-hagen				Moczyły	Kołbaskowo	Police
Schimmer-witz	Lauenburg				Siemiro-wice	Cewice	Lębork
Schinchow	Cammin				Siniechowo	Wolin	Kamień
Schinz	Belgard				Sińce	Białogard	Białogard
Schlackow	Schlawe				Złakowo	Postomino	Sławno
Schlagen-thin	Arnswalde				Sławęcin	Choszczno	Choszczno
Schlaischow	Lauenburg				Słajszewo	Choczewo	Wejherowo
Schlanow	Friedeberg				Słonów	Dobiegniew	Strzelce-Drezdenko
Schlawin	Schlawe				Słowino	Gmina Darłowo	Sławno
Schleffin	Greifenberg				Śliwin	Rewal	Gryfice
Schlemmin	Franzburg-Barth	Schlemmin	Ribnitz-Damgarten	Vorpommern-Rügen			
Schlennin	Belgard				Słonino	Tychowo	Białogard
Schlenzig	Belgard				Słowieńsko	Sławoborze	Świdwin
Schleps	Kolberg-Körlin				Stare Ślepce	Sławoborze	Świdwin
Schlochow	Lauenburg				Słuchowo	Krokowa	Puck
Schlochow	Stolp				Człuchy	Smołdzino	Słupsk
Schlönwitz	Belgard				Słonowice	Brzeżno	Świdwin
Schlötenitz	Pyritz				Stargard Szczeciński-Słotnica	Stargard Szczeciński (Stadt)	Stargard
Schloissin	Naugard				Słajsino	Nowogard	Goleniów
Schlu-schow	Lauenburg				Słuszewo	Gniewino	Wejherowo
Schmaatz	Stolp				Siemianice	Słupsk	Słupsk
Schmalentin	Greifenberg				Smolęcin	Gryfice	Gryfice
Schmal-zenthin	Neustettin				Smołdzę-cino	Ostrowice	Drawsko
Schmarsow	Demmin	Kruckow	Jarmen-Tutow	Demmin			
Schmarsow	Schlawe				Smardzewo	Sławno	Sławno
Schmel-lenthin	Greifen-hagen				Smolęcin	Kołbaskowo	Police
Schmelz-dorf	Regenwalde				Siwkowice	Resko	Łobez
Schmenzin	Belgard				Smęcino	Tychowo	Białogard
Schmid-tenthin	Neustettin				Śmidzięcino	Ostrowice	Drawsko
Schmirdau	Flatow				Śmiardowo Złotowski	Zakrzewo	Złotów
Schmir-tenau	Flatow				Śmiardowo Krajeńskie	Krajenka	Złotów
Schmolsin	Stolp				Smołdzino	Smołdzino	Słupsk
Schnatow	Cammin				Śniatowo	Kamień Pomorski	Kamień
Schneide-mühl b. Zicker	Neustettin				Żerdno	Czaplinek	Drawsko
Schnittriege	Naugard				Szczytniki	Nowogard	Goleniów
Schönau	Schlochau				Drzonowo	Biały Bór	Szczecinek
Schönberg	Schlochau				Kaliska	Biały Bór	Szczecinek
Schöne-beck	Saatzig				Dzwonowo	Marianowo	Stargard
Schöneberg	Saatzig				Krąpiel	Stargard Szczeciński	Stargard
Schönehr	Lauenburg				Szczenurze	Wicko	Lębork
Schön-eichen	Stolp				Dąbrówno	Potęgowo	Słupsk
Schönen-berg	Schlawe				Bylica	Postomino	Sławno
Schöneu	Regenwalde				Sienno Dolne	Radowo Małe	Łobez
Schönfeld	Arnswalde				Żeńsko	Krzęcin	Choszczno
Schönfeld	Demmin	Schönfeld	Demmin-Land	Demmin			
Schönfeld	Dramburg				Żeńsko (Borujsko)	Wierzchowo	Drawsko
Schönfeld	Flatow				Skórka	Krajenka	Złotów
Schönfeld	Friedeberg				Sławno	Strzelce Krajeńskie	Strzelce-Drezdenko
Schönfeld	Greifen-hagen	Schönfeld	Brüssow	Uckermark			
Schön-hagen	Naugard				Osina	Osina	Goleniów
Schöningen	Greifen-hagen				Kamieniec	Kołbaskowo	Police
Schöningen	Pyritz				Grędziec	Warnice	Pyrzyce
Schönings-walde	Schlawe				Sińczyca	Gmina Darłowo	Sławno
Schönow	Deutsch Krone				Dzwonowo	Człopa	Wałcz
Schönow	Greifen-hagen	Passow	Oder-Welse	Uckermark			
Schönow	Pyritz				Jesionowo	Przelewice	Pyrzyce
Schönrade	Friedeberg				Tuczno	Strzelce Krajeńskie	Strzelce-Drezdenko
Schön-walde	Naugard				Mokre	Maszewo	Goleniów
Schön-walde	Regenwalde				Zajezierze	Łobez	Łobez
Schön-walde	Stolp				Dębina	Ustka	Słupsk
Schön-walde	Uecker-münde	Schön-walde	Uecker-Randow-Tal	Uecker-Randow			
Schön-werder	Pyritz				Ziemomyśl A und Ziemomyśl B	Dolice	Stargard
Schötzow	Kolberg-Körlin				Skoczów	Dygowo	Kołobrzeg
Schorin	Stolp				Skórzyno	Główczyce	Słupsk
Schreit-staken	Köslin				Skrzeszewo	Będzino	Koszalin
Schrotz	Deutsch Krone				Skrzatusz	Szydłowo	Piła
Schruptow	Greifenberg				Skrobotowo	Karnice	Gryfice
Schübben	Köslin				Skibno	Sianów	Koszalin
Schuen-hagen	Franzburg-Barth	Velgast	Franzburg-Richtenberg	Vorpommern-Rügen			
Schütten-burg	Friedeberg				Sarbinowo	Dobiegniew	Strzelce-Drezdenko
Schützen-aue	Pyritz				Będgoszcz	Bielice	Pyrzyce
Schützen-dorf	Cammin				Budzień (Budzyń)	Stepnica	Goleniów
Schulzen-dorf	Deutsch Krone				Jeziorki	Tuczno	Wałcz
Schulzen-hagen	Köslin				Śmiechów	Będzino	Koszalin
Schurow	Stolp				Skórowo	Potęgowo	Słupsk
Schwabach	Naugard				Raduń (nicht mehr existent)		
Schwachen-walde	Arnswalde				Chłopowo	Krzęcin	Choszczno
Schwanen-beck	Saatzig				Suchanówko	Suchań	Stargard
Schwanken-heim	Naugard				Kiełpinica (nicht mehr existent)		
Schwante-fitz	Cammin				Świętowice	Stepnica	Goleniów
Schwantes-hagen	Cammin				Święto-szewo	Przybiernów	Goleniów
Schwartow	Lauenburg				Zwartowo	Choczewo	Wejherowo
Schwarz Damerkow	Stolp				Czarna Dąbrówka	Czarna Dąbrówka	Bytów
Schwarzin	Schlawe				Świerczyna	Polanów	Koszalin
Schwarzow	Naugard				Świerczewo	Nowogard	Goleniów
Schwedt	Kolberg-Körlin				Świecie Kołobrzeskie	Siemyśl	Kołobrzeg
Schwellin	Köslin				Świelino	Gmina Bobolice	Koszalin
Schwemmin	Köslin				Świemino	Biesiekierz	Koszalin
Schwendt	Saatzig				Święte	Stargard Szczeciński	Stargard
Schwen-nenz	Uecker-münde	Schwen-nenz	Löcknitz-Penkun	Uecker-Randow			
Schwente	Flatow				Święta	Złotów	Złotów
Schwenz	Cammin				Świniec	Kamień Pomorski	Kamień
Schwerin	Regenwalde				Zwierzynek	Węgorzyno	Łobez
Schwerins-feld	Arnswalde				Zwierzyn	Choszczno	Choszczno
Schwerins-höhe (1938-45 = Wendisch Silkow)	Stolp				Żelkowo	Główczyce	Słupsk
Schwerins-thal	Köslin				Skwier-zynka	Sianów	Koszalin
Schweslin	Lauenburg				Świetlino	Łęczyce	Wejherowo
Schwessin	Köslin				Świeszyno	Świeszyno	Koszalin
Schwessin	Rummels-burg				Świeszyno	Miastko	Bytów
Schwessow	Greifenberg				Świeszewo	Gryfice	Gryfice
Schwetz-kow	Stolp				Świeci-chowo	Damnica	Słupsk
Schwirsen	Cammin				Świerzno	Świerzno	Kamień
Schwochow	Pyritz				Swochowo	Bielice	Pyrzyce
Schwolow	Stolp				Swołowo	Słupsk	Słupsk
Stabitz	Deutsch Krone				Zdbice	Wałcz	Wałcz
Stäwen	Cammin				Stawno	Kamień Pomorski	Kamień
Stahlbrode	Grimmen	Reinberg	Miltzow	Vorpommern-Rügen			
Standemin	Belgard				Stanomino	Białogard	Białogard
Stantin	Stolp				Stanięcino	Słupsk	Słupsk
Stargordt	Regenwalde				Starogard	Resko	Łobez
Starkow	Rummels-burg				Starkowo	Trzebielino	Bytów
Starkow	Stolp				Starkowo	Ustka	Słupsk
Starnitz	Stolp				Starnice	Dębnica Kaszubska	Słupsk
Starsen	Schlochau				Starzno	Koczała	Człuchów
Stecklin	Greifenhagen				Steklno	Gryfino	Gryfino
Stegers	Schlochau				Rzecze-nica	Rzecze-nica	Człuchów
Steglin	Köslin				Szczeglino	Sianów	Koszalin
Steglin	Schlawe				Szczeglino	Sianów	Koszalin
Steinau	Flatow				Głubczyn	Krajenka	Złotów
Steinau	Rummels-burg				Turowo	Miastko	Bytów
Steinberg	Arnswalde				Słutowo	Recz	Choszczno
Steinborn	Schlochau				Słupia	Debrzno	Człuchów
Steinbusch	Arnswalde				Głusko	Dobiegniew	Strzelce-Drezdenko
Steinforth	Neustettin				Brodźce (nicht mehr existent)		
Steinforth	Schlochau				Trzyniec	Koczała	Człuchów
Steinfurt	Stolp				Wiatrowo	Damnica	Słupsk
Steinhagen	Franzburg-Barth	Steinhagen	Niepars	Vorpommern-Rügen			
Steinhöfel	Friedeberg				Przysieka	Zwierzyn	Strzelce-Drezdenko
Steinhöfel-Nöblin	Saatzig				Kamienny Most und Lublino	Chociwel	Stargard
Steinmark	Flatow				Sławianowo	Złotów	Złotów
Steinort	Schlawe				Gleźnowo	Gmina Darłowo	Sławno
Steinwald	Stolp				Krzemie-nica	Słupsk	Słupsk
Steinwehr	Greifen-hagen				Kamienny Jaz	Chojna	Gryfino
Stemnitz	Schlawe				Staniewice	Postomino	Sławno
Stepe	Neustettin				Stępień	Biały Bór	Szczecinek
Stepenitz	Cammin				Stepnica	Stepnica	Goleniów
Sternin	Kolberg-Körlin				Starnin	Rymań	Kołobrzeg
Steven-hagen	Naugard				Stawno	Goleniów	Goleniów
Stewnitz	Flatow				Stawnica	Złotów	Złotów
Stibbe	Deutsch Krone				Zdbowo	Tuczno	Wałcz
Stieglitz	Netzekreis				Siedlisko	Trzcianka	Czarnków-Trzcianka
Stoben	Usedom-Wollin	Benz	Usedom-Süd	Ost-vorpommern			
Stöckow	Kolberg-Körlin				Stojkowo	Dygowo	Kołobrzeg
Stöwen	Dramburg				Stawno	Złocieniec	Drawsko
Stöwen	Netzekreis				Stobno	Trzcianka	Czarnków-Trzcianka
Stohentin	Stolp				Stojcino	Smołdzino	Słupsk
Stojentin	Stolp				Stowięcino	Główczyce	Słupsk
Stolpe	Usedom-Wollin	Stolpe	Usedom-Süd	Ost-vorpommern			
Stolpmünde	Stolp				Ustka	Ustka	Słupsk
Stolten-hagen	Grimmen	Grimmen	(amtsfrei)	Vorpommern-Rügen			
Stolzen-berg	Kolberg-Körlin				Sławo-borze	Sławo-borze	Świdwin
Stolzen-burg	Uecker-münde	Schönwalde	Uecker-Randow-Tal	Uecker-Randow			
Stolzen-burg	Uecker-münde (bis 1939 Land-kreis Randow)				Stolec	Dobra	Police
Stolzenfelde	Arnswalde				Stradzewo	Choszczno	Choszczno
Stolzenfelde	Schlochau				Stołczno	Człuchów	Człuchów
Stolzen-hagen	Saatzig				Ognica	Dobrzany	Stargard
Storkow	Greifen-hagen	Penkun	Löcknitz-Penkun	Uecker-Randow			
Storkow	Neustettin				Storkowo	Grzmiąca	Szczecinek
Storkow	Saatzig				Storkówko	Stara Dąbrowa	Stargard
Strachmin	Köslin				Stracho-mino	Będzino	Koszalin
Straduhn	Netzekreis				Straduń	Trzcianka	Czarnków-Trzcianka
Strahlen-berg	Deutsch Krone				Strzaliny	Tuczno	Wałcz
Stramehl	Regenwalde				Strzmiele	Radowo Małe	Łobez
Stranz	Deutsch Krone				Strączno	Wałcz	Wałcz
Straßfurt (bis 1939 = Straßforth)	Flatow				Grudna (Ort nicht auffindbar)		
Strbelow	Pyritz				Strzebie-lewo	Dolice	Stargard
Strecken-thin	Köslin				Strzekęcino	Świeszyno	Koszalin
Strecken-tin	Greifenberg				Strzykocin	Brojce	Gryfice
Streitz	Köslin				Strzeżenice	Będzino	Koszalin
Streitzig	Neustettin				Trzesieka	Szczecinek	Szczecinek
Strellentin	Lauenburg				Strzelęcino	Łęczyce	Wejherowo
Strelow-hagen	Naugard				Strzelewo	Nowogard	Goleniów
Stremlau	Schlochau				Trzmielewo	Rzeczenica	Czluchów
Stresow	Cammin				Strzeżewo	Kamień Pomorski	Kamień
Stresow	Greifen-hagen				Strzeszów	Trzcińsko Zdrój	Gryfino
Stresow	Stolp				Strzyżyno	Damnica	Słupsk
Stretzin	Schlochau				Strzeczona	Debrzno	Człuchów
Strickers-hagen	Stolp				Przewłoka	Ustka	Słupsk
Strippow	Köslin				Strzepowo	Będzino	Koszalin
Strohsdorf	Pyritz				Stróżewo	Pyrzyce	Pyrzyce
Strussow	Bütow				Struszewo	Borzy-tuchom	Bytów
Stuchow	Cammin				Stuchowo	Świerzno	Kamień
Stüdnitz	Bütow				Studzie-nice	Studzie-nice	Bytów
Tadden	Lauenburg				Tadzino	Gniewino	Wejherowo
Tangen	Bütow				Tągowie	Tuchomie	Bytów
Tankow	Friedeberg				Danków	Strzelce Krajeńskie	Strzelce-Drezdenko
Tantow	Greifen-hagen	Tantow	Gartz (Oder)	Uckermark			
Tarnow	Regenwalde				Tarnowo	Łobez	Łobez
Tarnowke	Flatow				Tarnówka	Tarnówka	Złotów
Tauenzin	Lauenburg				Tawęcino	Nowa Wieś Lęborska	Lębork
Techlipp	Rummels-burg				Ciecholub	Kępice	Słupsk
Technow	Belgard				Ciechnowo	Sławoborze	Świdwin
Temnick	Saatzig				Ciemnik	Ińsko	Stargard
Tempel	Franzburg-Barth	Ribnitz-Damgarten	Ribnitz-Damgarten	Vorpommern-Rügen			
Teschenbusch	Belgard				Cieszyno	Świdwin	Świdwin
Teschendorf	Dramburg				Cieszyno	Złocieniec	Drawsko
Teschendorf	Regenwalde				Cieszyno	Węgorzyno	Łobez
Tessin	Cammin				Troszyn	Wolin	Kamień
Tessin	Köslin				Cieszyn	Biesiekierz	Koszalin
Tetzlaffshagen	Cammin				Ciesław	Świerzno	Kamień
Teusin	Demmin	Utzedel	Demmin-Land	Demmin			
Thänsdorf	Greifen-hagen				Grzybno	Chojna	Gryfino
Theerofen	Netzekreis				Smolarnia	Trzcianka	Czarnków-Trzcianka
Theresia	Netzekreis				Teresin	Trzcianka	Czarnków-Trzcianka
Thesenvitz	Rügen	Thesenvitz	Bergen auf Rügen	Rügen			
Thiessow	Rügen	Thiessow	Mönchgut-Granitz	Rügen			
Thunow	Köslin				Dunowo	Świeszyno	Koszalin
Thurow	Neustettin				Turowo	Szczecinek	Szczecinek
Thyn	Schlawe				Tyń	Postomino	Sławno
Tietzow	Belgard				Tyczewo	Tychowo	Białogard
Timmenhagen	Köslin				Tymień	Będzino	Koszalin
Todenhagen	Köslin				Dobre	Będzino	Koszalin
Törpin	Demmin	Sarow	Demmin-Land	Demmin			
Tolz	Saatzig				Tolcz	Stara Dąbrowa	Stargard
Tonnebuhr	Cammin				Unibórz	Golczewo	Kamień
Tonnin	Usedom-Wollin				Unin	Wolin	Kamień
Torgelow	Uecker-münde	Torgelow	Torgelow-Ferdinandshof	Uecker-Randow			
Torgelow, Holländerei	Uecker-münde	Torgelow-Holländerei	Am Stettiner Haff	Uecker-Ranow			
Tornow	Saatzig				Tarnowo Pomorskie	Suchań	Stargard
Trabehn	Neustettin				Drawień	Szczecinek	Szczecinek
Trampke	Saatzig				Trąbki	Marianowo	Stargard
Trantow	Grimmen	Sassen-Trantow	Peenetal/Loitz	Demmin			
Trassen-heide	Usedom-Wollin	Trassen-heide	Usedom-Nord	Ost-vorpommern			
Trebbin	Deutsch Krone				Trzebin	Człopa	Wałcz
Trebenow	Cammin				Trzebianowo	Przybiernów	Goleniów
Trebitsch	Friedeberg				Trzebicz	Gmina Drezdenko	Strzelce-Drezdenko
Treblin	Rummels-burg				Trzebielino	Trzebielino	Bytów
Trechel	Naugard				Trzechel	Nowogard	Goleniów
Trent	Rügen	Trent	West-Rügen	Rügen			
Treptow	Saatzig				Trzebiatów	Stargard Szczeciński	Stargard
Tressin	Greifenberg				Trzeszyn	Karnice	Gryfice
Trestin	Uecker-münde				Trzeszczyn	Police	Police
Treten	Rummels-burg				Dretyń	Miastko	Bytów
Treuenfelde (bis 1937 = Zu-kowken)	Bütow				Żukówko	Parchowo	Bytów
Treuenheide	Flatow				Paruszka	Krajenka	Złotów
Tribsow	Cammin				Trzebie-szewo	Kamień Pomorski	Kamień
Triebs	Greifenberg				Trzebusz	Trzebiatów	Gryfice
Trieglaff	Greifenberg				Trzygłów	Gryfice	Gryfice
Trinwil-lershagen	Franzburg-Barth	Trinwil-lershagen	Barth	Vorpommern-Rügen			
Trittelwitz	Demmin	Schönfeld	Demmin-Land	Demmin			
Trockenglienke	Neustettin				Glinki Suche	Okonek	Złotów
Trutzlatz	Naugard				Truskolas	Płoty	Gryfice
Tützpatz	Demmin	Tützpatz	Treptower Tollensewinkel	Demmin			
Turow	Grimmen	Glewitz	Franzburg-Richtenberg	Vorpommern-Rügen			
Turzig	Rummels-burg				Tursko	Miastko	Bytów
Tychow	Schlawe				Tychowo	Sławno	Sławno
Ubedel	Köslin				Ubiedrze	Gmina Bobolice	Koszalin
Uchtdorf	Greifen-hagen				Lisie Pole	Chojna	Gryfino
Uchten-hagen	Saatzig				Krzywnica	Stara Dąbrowa	Stargard
Überlauf	Stolp				Gałęzi-nowo	Słupsk	Słupsk
Ückeritz	Usedom-Wollin	Ückeritz	Usedom-Süd	Ost-vorpommern			
Uhlingen	Lauenburg				Ulinia	Wicko	Lębork
Ulrichsdorf	Bütow				Kłączno	Studzienice	Bytów
Ulrichs-felde	Stolp				Bolesławice	Kobylnica	Słupsk
Ulrichs-horst	Usedom-Wollin	Korswandt	Usedom-Süd	Ost-vorpommern			
Ummanz	Rügen	Ummanz	West-Rügen	Rügen			
Unheim	Regenwalde				Unimie	Łobez	Łobez
Usch (Netzekreis) (bis 1937 = Deutsch Usch)	Netzekreis				Ujście	Ujście	Piła
Usch Hauland	Netzekreis				Ługi Ujśkie	Ujście	Piła
Utzedel	Demmin	Utzedel	Demmin-Land	Demmin			
Vangerow	Köslin				Węgorzewo Koszalińskie	Sianów	Koszalin
Vangerow	Neustettin				Węgorzewo Szczecinecki	Okonek	Złotów
Vanselow	Demmin	Sieden-brünzow	Demmin-Land	Demmin			
Varbelow	Schlawe				Warblewo	Polanów	Koszalin
Varchmin	Köslin				Wierzcho-mino	Będzino	Koszalin
Varchmins-hagen	Köslin				Wierzcho-minko	Będzino	Koszalin
Vargow	Stolp				Wargowo	Czarna Dąbrówka	Bytów
Varzin	Rummels-burg				Warcino	Kępice	Słupsk
Varzmin	Stolp				Warcimino	Potęgowo	Słupsk
Veddin	Stolp				Widzino	Kobylnica	Słupsk
Vehlings-dorf	Saatzig				Wieleń Pomorski	Chociwel	Stargard
Velgast	Franzburg-Barth	Velgast	Franzburg-Richtenberg	Vorpommern-Rügen			
Vellin	Schlawe				Wielin	Polanów	Koszalin
Velsow	Stolp				Wieliszewo	Potęgowo	Słupsk
Venzlaffs-hagen	Belgard				Więcław	Brzeżno	Świdwin
Verchen	Demmin	Verchen	Demmin-Land	Demmin			
Versin	Rummels-burg				Wierszyno	Kołczygłowy	Bytów
Vessin	Stolp				Wieszyno	Słupsk	Słupsk
Viartlum	Rummels-burg				Wiatrołom	Miastko	Bytów
Viereck	Uecker-münde	Viereck	Uecker-Randow-Tal	Uecker-Randow			
Vieschen	Stolp				Wiszno	Damnica	Słupsk
Vietkow	Stolp				Witkowo	Smołdzino	Słupsk
Vietzig	Lauenburg				Wicko	Wicko	Lębork
Vietzker-strand	Schlawe				Wicko Morskie	Postomino	Sławno
Vietzow	Belgard				Wicewo	Tychowo	Białogard
Vilgelow	Stolp				Wielogłowy	Damnica	Słupsk
Villkow	Lauenburg				Wilkowo Nowowiejskie	Nowa Wieś Lęborska	Lębork
Villnow	Neustettin				Wielanowo	Grzmiąca	Szczecinek
Virchenzin	Stolp				Wierzcho-cino	Smołdzino	Słupsk
Virchow	Dramburg				Wierzchowo	Wierzchowo	Drawsko
Vitte	Schlawe				Wicie	Gmina Darłowo	Sławno
Vixow	Stolp				Wykosowo	Główczyce	Słupsk
Vocken-hagen	Greifenberg				Zapolice	Trzebiatów	Gryfice
Völschen-hagen	Greifenberg				Wilczkowo	Gryfice	Gryfice
Völschow	Demmin	Völschow	Jarmen-Tutow	Demmin			
Völzkow	Belgard				Wilczkowo	Brzeżno	Świdwin
Vogelsang	Uecker-münde	Vogelsang-Warsin	Am Stettiner Haff	Uecker-Randow			
Voigts-hagen	Greifenberg				Włodarka	Trzebiatów	Gryfice
Voigts-hagen	Naugard				Wojtaszyce	Dobra	Łobez
Vorbein	Grimmen	Loitz	Peenetal/Loitz	Demmin			
Vorbruch	Belgard				Rzęsna	Połczyn Zdrój	Świdwin
Vorbruch	Friedeberg				Łęgowo	Stare Kurowo	Strzelce-Drezdenko
Vordamm	Friedeberg				Drezdenko-Nowe Dredenko	Gmina Drezdenko (Stadt)	Strzelce Krajenńskie-Drezdenko
Vorwerk	Belgard				Białogard-Kisielice	Białogard(Stadt)	Białogard
Vorwerk	Demmin	Demmin-Vorwerk	Demmin (Stadt)	Demmin			
Voßberg	Saatzig				Lisowo	Chociwel	Stargard
Wahrlang	Uecker-münde				Warnołeka	Nowe Warpno	Police
Wald-dievenow (Klein Dievenow)	Cammin				Dziwnówek	Dziwnów	Kamień
Waldeshöhe	Uecker-münde	Jatznick	Uecker-Randow-Tal	Uecker-Randow			
Waldow	Rummels-burg				Wałdowo	Miastko	Bytów
Wallachsee	Neustettin				Chwalimie	Okonek	Złotów
Walsleben	Naugard				Korytowo	Maszewo	Goleniów
Wamlitz	Uecker-münde				Wąwelnica	Dobra	Police
Wandhagen	Schlawe				Wierci-szewo	Sianów	Koszalin
Wangerin	Greifenberg				Węgorzyn	Karnice	Gryfice
Wangerin B	Regenwalde				Stare Węgorzynko	Węgorzyno	Łobez
Wangeritz	Naugard				Węgorzyce	Osina	Goleniów
Warbelin	Stolp				Warblino	Główczyce	Słupsk
Warbelow	Stolp				Warblewo	Słupsk	Słupsk
Wardin	Arnswalde				Wardyń	Choszczno	Choszczno
Warlang	Neustettin				Warniłęg	Złocieniec	Drawsko
Warnin	Belgard				Warnino	Tychowo	Białogard
Warnin	Köslin				Warnino	Biesiekierz	Koszalin
Warnitz	Pyritz				Warnice	Warnice	Pyrzyce
Warnow	Usedom-Wollin				Warnowo	Wolin	Kamień
Warsin	Pyritz				Warszyn	Dolice	Stargard
Wartekow	Kolberg-Körlin				Wartkowo	Gościno	Kołobrzeg
Warten- berg	Pyritz				Parsów	Bielice	Pyrcyze
Warten-stein	Belgard				Przyrzecze	Brzeżno	Świdwin
Warthe	Usedom-Wollin	Rankwitz	Usedom-Süd	Ost-vorpommern			
Wartin	Greifenhagen	Casekow	Gartz (Oder)	Uckermark			
Weckow	Cammin				Wiejkowo	Wolin	Kamień
Wedellsdorf	Saatzig				(nicht mehr existent)		
Wehnershof	Schlochau				Międzybórz	Rzeczenica	Człuchów
Weiten-hagen	Franzburg-Barth	Weiten-hagen	Franzburg-Richtenberg	Vorpommern-Rügen			
Weiten-hagen	Greifswald	Weiten-hagen	Landhagen	Ost-vorpommern			
Weiten-hagen	Naugard				Grzęzno	Dobra	Łobez
Weiten-hagen	Stolp				Wytowno	Ustka	Słupsk
Welschen-burg	Dramburg				Oleszno	Drawsko Pomorskie	Drawsko
Weltzin	Demmin	Burow	Treptower Tollensewinkel	Demmin			
Welzin	Usedom-Wollin	Usedom-Welzin	Usedom-Süd	Ost-vorpommern			
Wendisch Baggendorf	Grimmen	Wendisch Baggen-dorf	Franzburg-Richtenberg	Vorpommern-Rügen			
Wendisch Buckow (1938-45 = Buckow)	Schlawe				Bukowo	Polanów	Koszalin
Wendisch Karstnitz (1938-45 = Ramnitz)	Stolp				Karznica	Potęgowo	Słupsk
Wendisch Plassow (1938-45 = Plassenberg	Stolp				Płaszewo	Kobylnica	Słupsk
Wendisch Pribbernow	Greifenberg				Przybier-nowo	Brojce	Gryfice
Wendisch Puddiger (1938-45 = Puddiger)	Rummels-burg				Podgóry	Kępice	Słupsk
Wendisch Silkow (1938-45 = Schwerinshöhe)	Stolp				Żelkowo	Główczyce	Słupsk
Wendorf	Franzburg-Barth	Wendorf	Niepars	Vorpommern-Rügen			
Wengerz	Flatow				Węgierce	Tarnówka	Złotów
Werben	Pyritz				Wierzbno	Warnice	Pyrzyce
Werder	Demmin	Werder	Treptower Tollensewinkel	Demmin			
West Dievenow	Usedom-Wollin				Dziwna (nicht mehr existent)		
Westgönne	Neustettin				Stare Gonne	Czaplinek	Drawsko
Wieck	Franzburg-Barth	Wieck	Darß/Fischland	Vorpommern-Rügen			
Wieck	Schlawe				Wiekowice	Gmina Darłowo	Sławno
Wiek	Rügen	Wiek	Nord-Rügen	Rügen			
Wiepken-hagen	Franzburg-Barth	Trinwillers-hagen	Barth	Vorpommern-Rügen			
Wierow	Greifen-hagen				Wirów	Gryfino	Gryfino
Wier-schutzin	Lauenburg				Wierz-chucino	Krokowa	Puck
Wiesental	Netzekreis				Przesieki	Krzyż Wielkopolski	Czarnków-Trzcianka
Wiesenthal	Schlawe				Święcianowo	Malechowo	Sławno
Wiesen-werder	Arnswalde				Pustkowie (nicht mehr existent)		
Wietstock	Cammin				Wysoka Kamieńska	Golczewo	Kamień
Wildberg	Demmin	Wildberg	Treptower Tollensewinkel	Landkreis Demmin			
Wilden-bruch	Greifen-hagen				Swobnica	Banie	Gryfino
Wilden-hagen	Cammin				Gadom	Golczewo	Kamień
Wildenow	Friedeberg				Wielis-ławice	Strzelce Krajeńskie	Strzelce-Drezdenko
Wildforth	Dramburg				Prostynia	Kalisz Pomorski	Drawsko
Wilhelmine	Schlawe				Wilkowice	Postomino	Sławno
Wilhelms-bruch	Flatow				Białobłocie	Lipka	Złotów
Wilhelms-burg	Uecker-münde	Wilhelms-burg	Torgelow-Ferdinandshof	Uecker-Randow			
Wilhelms-dorf	Uecker-münde				Uniemyśl	Police	Police
Wilhelms-felde	Naugard				Czarna Łąka	Goleniów	Goleniów
Wilhelms-horst	Neustettin				Jelonek	Borne Sulinowo	Szczecinek
Wilhelms-see	Flatow				Kleszczynka	Złotów	Złotów
Winningen	Regenwalde				Winniki	Węgorzyno	Łobez
Winters-felde	Greifen-hagen				Czepino	Gryfino	Gryfino
Winters-hagen	Stolp				Grabno	Ustka	Słupsk
Wisbu	Regenwalde				Wyszobór	Płoty	Gryfice
Wisbuhr	Köslin				Wyszebórz	Manowo	Koszalin
Wißmar	Naugard				Wyszomierz	Nowogard	Goleniów
Wissulke	Deutsch Krone				Wiesiołka	Wałcz	Wałcz
Wittbeck	Stolp				Czysta	Smołdzino	Słupsk
Wittenberg	Lauenburg				Białogóra	Krokowa	Puck
Wittenburg	Flatow				Dolnik	Krajenka	Złotów
Wittenfelde	Greifenberg				Witno	Gryfice	Gryfice
Wittenfelde	Naugard				Bielice	Maszewo	Goleniów
Witten-hagen	Grimmen	Witten-hagen	Miltzow	Vorpommern-Rügen			
Wittichow	Pyritz				Witkowo Pierwsze (Wikowo I)	Stargard Szczeciński	Stargard
Wittkow	Deutsch Krone				Witankowo	Wałcz	Wałcz
Wittstock	Stolp				Wysoka	Smołdzino	Słupsk
Witzmitz	Regenwalde				Wicimice	Płoty	Gryfice
Wobbermin	Pyritz				Obromino	Pyrzyce	Pyrzyce
Wobensin	Lauenburg				Niebędzino	Nowa Wieś Lęborska	Lębork
Wobesde	Stolp				Objazda	Ustka	Słupsk
Wobeser	Rummels-burg				Objezierze	Trzebielino	Bytów
Woblanse	Rummels-burg				Obłęże	Kępice	Słupsk
Wobrow	Kolberg-Körlin				Obroty	Kołobrzeg	Kołobrzeg
Wocknin	Rummels-burg				Okunino	Miastko	Bytów
Woedtke	Greifenberg				Otok	Gryfice	Gryfice
Woistenthin	Cammin				Ościęcin	Gryfice	Gryfice
Woitzel	Regenwalde				Wysiedle	Łobez	Łobez
Wolchow	Naugard				Olchowo	Nowogard	Goleniów
Woldenburg	Regenwalde				Dąbie	Płoty	Gryfice
Wolfshagen	Kölsin				Słowien-kowo	Będzino	Koszalin
Wolfshorst	Naugard				Jedliny (nicht mehr existent)		
Wolgast	Friedeberg				Woło-goszcz	Dobiegniew	Strzelce-Drezdenko
Wolgaster-fähre	Usedom-Wollin	Wolgast	Am Peenestrom	Ost-vorpommern			
Wolkow	Demmin	Warrenzin	Demmin-Land	Demmin			
Wolkow	Regenwalde				Wołkowo	Radowo Małe	Łobez
Wollin	Greifenhagen	Penkun	Löcknitz-Penkun	Uecker-Randow			
Wollin	Stolp				Wolinia	Główczyce	Słupsk
Wollmirstädt	Usedom-Wollin				Żółwino	Wolin	Kamień
Woltersdorf	Dramburg				Linowo	Drawsko Pomorskie	Drawsko
Woltersdorf	Greifen-hagen				Sobieradz	Gryfino	Gryfino
Woltersdorf	Greifen-hagen (früher Kr. Randow)	Casekow	Gartz (Oder)	Ueckermark			
Woltersdorf	Schlochau				Kiełpin	Człuchów	Człuchów
Woltin	Greifen-hagen				Wełtyń	Gryfino	Gryfino
Wonzow	Flatow				Wąsosz	Złotów	Złotów
Wopersnow	Belgard				Oparzno	Świdwin	Świdwin
Wordel	Deutsch Krone				Orla	Mirosławiec	Wałcz
Wotenick	Grimmen	Demmin-Wotenick	Demmin (Stadt)	Demmin			
Wottnogge (1938-45 = Mühlental)	Stolp				Otnoga	Czarna Dąbrówka	Bytów
Wuckel	Neustettin				Okole	Borne Sulinowo	Szczecinek
Wudarge	Saatzig				Odargowo	Dobrzany	Stargard
Wüsten-felde	Demmin	Loitz	Peenetal/Loitz	Demmin			
Wüsten-felde	Grimmen	Brands-hagen	Miltzow	Vorpommern-Rügen			
Wugarten	Friedeberg				Ogardy	Strzelce Krajeńskie	Strzelce-Drezdenko
Wulfflatzke	Neustettin				Wilcze Laski	Szczecinek	Szczecinek
Wulkow	Saatzig				Ulikowo	Stargard Szczeciński	Stargard
Wundichow	Stolp				Unichowo	Czarna Dąbrówka	Bytów
Wunneschin	Lauenburg				Unieszyno	Cewice	Lębork
Wurchow	Neustettin				Wierzchowo	Szczecinek	Szczecinek
Wurow	Regenwalde				Worowo	Łobez	Łobez
Wusseken	Bütow				Osieki	Borzy-tuchom	Bytów
Wusseken	Köslin				Osieki	Sianów	Koszalin
Wusseken	Schlawe				Osieki	Kępice	Słupsk
Wussow	Belgard				Osowo	Świdwin	Świdwin
Wussow	Lauenburg				Osowo Lęborski	Cewice	Lębork
Wussow	Naugard				Osowo	Nowogard	Goleniów
Wussow	Rummels-burg				Osowo	Kępice	Słupsk
Wuster-barth	Belgard				Ostre Bardo	Połczyn Zdrój	Świdwin
Wuster-hanse	Neustettin				Ostrowąsy	Barwice	Szczecinek
Wuster-husen	Greifswald	Wuster-husen	Lubmin	Ost-vorpommern			
Wustermitz	Cammin				Ostromice	Wolin	Kamień
Wusterwitz	Dramburg				Ostrowice	Ostrowice	Drawsko
Wusterwitz	Schlawe				Ostrowiec	Malechowo	Sławno
Wutzig	Dramburg				Osiek Drawski	Wierz-chowo	Drawsko
Wutzig	Friedeberg				Osiek	Dobiegniew	Strzelce-Drezdenko
Wutzkow	Belgard				Osówko	Tychowo	Białogard
Wutzkow	Stolp				Oskowo	Cewice	Lębork
Zachow	Regenwalde				Czachowo	Radowo Małe	Łobez
Zackenzin	Lauenburg				Ciekocino	Choczewo	Wejherowo
Zadelow	Saatzig				Sadłowo	Suchań	Stargard
Zadow	Deutsch Krone				Sadowo	Mirosławiec	Wałcz
Zadtkow	Belgard				Sadkowo	Tychowo	Białogard
Zägensdorf	Arnswalde				Żeliszewo	Recz	Choszczno
Zamborst	Neustettin				Samborsko	Jastrowie	Złotow
Zamow	Greifenberg				Samowo	Kołobrzeg	Kołobrzeg
Zampel-hagen	Naugard				Sąpolnica	Nowogard	Goleniów
Zamzow	Saatzig				Ziemsko	Drawsko Pomorskie	Drawsko
Zanthier-Sadelberg	Saatzig				Sątyrz Pierwszy (Sątyrz I)	Chociwel	Stargard
Zarben	Greifenberg				Sarbia	Kołobrzeg	Kołobrzeg
Zarnefanz	Belgard				Czarno-węsy	Białogard	Białogard
Zarnekla	Grimmen	Düvier	Peenetal/Loitz	Demmin			
Zarnglaff	Cammin				Czarno-głowy	Przybiernów	Goleniów
Zarnikow	Saatzig				Czarnkowo	Marianowo	Stargard
Zarrendorf	Grimmen	Zarrendorf	Niepars	Vorpommern-Rügen			
Zarrenthin	Demmin	Bentzin	Jarmen-Tutow	Demmin			
Zarrenthin	Grimmen	Sassen-Trantow	Peenetal/Loitz	Demmin			
Zartenthin	Cammin				Czarnocin	Stepnica	Goleniów
Zartzig	Saatzig				Strachocin	Stargard Szczeciński	Stargard
Zasker-hütte	Netzekreis				Sarcz	Trzcianka	Czarnków-Trzcianka
Zatten	Arnswalde				Zatom	Drawno	Choszczno
Zebbin	Cammin				Sibin	Kamień Pomorski	Kamień
Zechendorf	Deutsch Krone				Czechyń	Wałcz	Wałcz
Zechendorf	Neustettin				Czechy	Grzmiąca	Szczecinek
Zecherin im Usedomer Winkel	Usedom-Wollin	Usedom-Zecherin	Usedom-Süd	Ost-vorpommern			
Zecherin im Wolgaster Ort	Usedom-Wollin	Mölschow	Usedom-Nord	Ost-vorpommern			
Zechlin	Stolp				Żychlin	Potęgowo	Słupsk
Zedlin	Greifenberg				Sadlno	Trzebiatów	Gryfice
Zedlin	Stolp				Siodłonie	Główczyce	Słupsk
Zehrten	Saatzig				Czertyń	Ińsko	Stargard
Zeinicke	Saatzig				Ścienne	Ińsko	Stargard
Zeitlitz	Regenwalde				Siedlice	Radowo Małe	Łobez
Zemlin	Cammin				Samlino	Golczewo	Kamień
Zemmen	Bütow				Ciemno	Tuchomie	Bytów
Zemmin	Demmin	Bentzin	Jarmen-Tutow	Demmin			
Zemmin	Neustettin				Cieminko	Ostrowice	Drawsko
Zemmin	Stolp				Ciemino	Główczyce	Słupsk
Zempin	Usedom-Wollin	Zempin	Usedom-Süd	Ost-vorpommern			
Zernin	Kolberg-Körlin				Czernin	Dygowo	Kołobrzeg
Zerrehne	Köslin				Sieranie	Świeszyn	Koszalin
Zerrin	Bütow				Sierzno	Bytów	Bytów
Zetthun	Köslin				Cetuń	Polanów	Koszalin
Zettin	Rummels-burg				Cetyń	Trzebielino	Bytów
Zetzin	Dramburg				Siecino	Ostrowice	Drawsko
Zewelin	Köslin				Cewlino	Manowo	Koszalin
Zewitz	Lauenburg				Cewice	Cewice	Lębork
Zezenow	Stolp				Cecenowo	Główczyce	Słupsk
Zicker	Neustettin				Sikory	Czaplinek	Drawsko
Zickerke	Naugard				Sikorki	Nowogard	Goleniów
Ziegen-hagen	Saatzig				Rybaki	Recz	Choszczno
Ziegenort	Uecker-münde				Trzebież	Police	Police
Ziegnitz	Schlawe				Ściegnica	Kobylnica	Słupsk
Zietlow	Belgard				Sidłowo	Sławoborze	Świdwin
Zietzen	Stolp				Siecie	Smołdzino	Słupsk
Ziezeneff	Belgard				Ciesze-niewo	Świdwin	Świdwin
Zillmitz	Schlawe				Sulimice	Gmina Darłowo	Sławno
Zimdarse	Greifenberg				Siemi-darżno	Trzebiatów	Gryfice
Zimmer-hausen	Regenwalde				Mechowo	Płoty	Gryfice
Zimmer-mannshorst	Naugard				Cisewo	Kobylanka	Stargard
Zingst	Franzburg-Barth	Zingst	(amtsfrei)	Vorpommern-Rügen			
Zinnowitz	Usedom-Wollin	Zinnowitz	Usedom-Nord	Ost-vorpommern			
Zipkow	Stolp				Szczypko-wice	Główczyce	Słupsk
Zippnow	Deutsch Krone				Sypniewo	Jastrowie	Złotów
Zirchow	Schlawe				Sierakowo Sławieńskie	Sianów	Koszalin
Zirchow	Stolp				Sierakowo Słupskie	Kobylnica	Słupsk
Zirchow	Usedom-Wollin	Zirchow	Usedom-Süd	Ost-vorpommern			
Zirkow, Dorf	Rügen	Zirkow	Mönchgut-Granitz	Rügen			
Zirkwitz	Greifenberg				Cerkwica	Karnice	Gryfice
Zirzlaff	Usedom-Wollin				Sierosław	Wolin	Kamień
Ziskau	Flatow				Czyżkowo	Lipka	Złotów
Zitzewitz	Stolp				Sycewice	Kobylnica	Słupsk
Zitzmar	Greifenberg				Ciećmierz	Karnice	Gryfice
Zitzmin	Schlawe				Sieciemin	Sianów	Koszalin
Zizow	Schlawe				Cisowo	Gmina Darłowo	Sławno
Zoldekow	Cammin				Sulikowo	Świerzno	Kamień
Zollbrück	Rummels-burg				Korzybie	Kępice	Słupsk
Zowen	Regenwalde				Sowno	Płoty	Gryfice
Zozenow	Regenwalde				Sosnowo	Resko	Łobez
Zuch	Neustettin				Sucha	Grzmiąca	Szczecinek
Zuchen	Belgard				Sucha	Połczyn Zdrój	Świdwin
Zuchen	Köslin				Sucha Koszalińska	Sianów	Koszalin
Zuchow	Dramburg				Suchowo	Kalisz Pomorski	Drawsko
Zuckers	Rummels-burg				Suchorze	Trzebielino	Bytów
Zudar	Rügen	Garz/Rü-gen-Zudar	Bergen auf Rügen	Rügen			
Zühlitz	Rügen	Alten-kirchen	Nord-Rügen	Rügen			
Zühlsdorf	Arnswalde				Suliszewo	Choszczno	Choszczno
Zülken-hagen	Neustettin				Sulikowo	Barwice	Szczecinek
Zülshagen	Dramburg				Suliszewo	Drawsko Pomorskie	Drawsko
Zülzefitz	Regenwalde				Sulisze-wice	Łobez	Łobez
Zünz	Usedom-Wollin				Zastań	Wolin	Kamień
Züssow	Greifswald	Züssow	Züssow	Ost-vorpommern			
Zützer	Deutsch Krone				Szczuczarz	Człopa	Wałcz
Zukowken (1938-45 = Treuenfelde)	Bütow				Żukówko	Parchowo	Bytów
Zwilipp	Kolberg-Körlin				Świelubie	Dygowo	Kołobrzeg
Zwirnitz	Belgard				Świerznica	Rąbino	Świdwin
