= National road 37 (Poland) =

National road in Poland

National Road 37
- Droga krajowa nr 37

Route information
- Maintained by GDDKiA
- Length: 14.6 km (9.1 mi)

Major junctions
- From: Darłowo
- To: Karwice

Location
- Country: Poland
- Regions: West Pomeranian Voivodeship
- Major cities: Darłowo

Highway system
- National roads in Poland; Voivodeship roads
← DK 36	→ DK 38

National road 37 (Polish: Droga krajowa nr 37, abbreviated as DK37) is a main road (class G road)(Polish: droga główna, droga klasy G) route belonging to Polish national roads network, located in West Pomeranian Voivodeship. With its length of 14.6 kilometres (9.1 mi), the route connects the town of Darłowo with national road 6 near Karwice. A new junction has being constructed in and opened in May 2026, linking road 37 with expressway S6.

Until 31 December 2005 the route was categorized as powiat road (Polish: droga powiatowa) 0507Z (even earlier 17-451). On 1 January 2006, based on the Regulation of Minister of Infrastructure of 6 May 2005, the route was included in the category of national roads.

The matter of upgrading the road category to national road was for some time on the circle of interests of politicians, mostly from Samoobrona party. The route had a particular importance for Andrzej Lepper, who lived in Zielnowo near Darłowo. Because of that, the road has been nicknamed "Lepperówka".

== Permissible axle load ==
From 13 March 2021, vehicles with a single drive axle load of up to 11.5 tonnes (25,000 lb) are allowed to travel on the entire route.

=== Until 13 March 2021 ===
Earlier on the entire route maximum permissible axle load was 8 tonnes (18,000 lb).

== Localities along road 37 ==
- Darłowo
- Rusko
- Domasławice
- Słowino
- Sęczkowo
- Karwice (road 6)
