= Drozdowo, Sławno County =

Drozdowo
- Village
- Location within Poland
- Coordinates: 54°27′44″N 16°30′25″E
- Country: Poland
- Voivodeship: West Pomeranian
- County: Sławno
- Gmina: Darłowo
- Population: 198

Drozdowo [drɔzˈdɔvɔ] is a village in the administrative district of Gmina Darłowo, within Sławno County, West Pomeranian Voivodeship, in north-western Poland. It lies approximately 8 km (5 mi) north-east of Darłowo, 16 km (10 mi) north-west of Sławno, and 172 km (107 mi) north-east of the regional capital Szczecin.

For the history of the region, see History of Pomerania.
