= Cisowo =

- Village
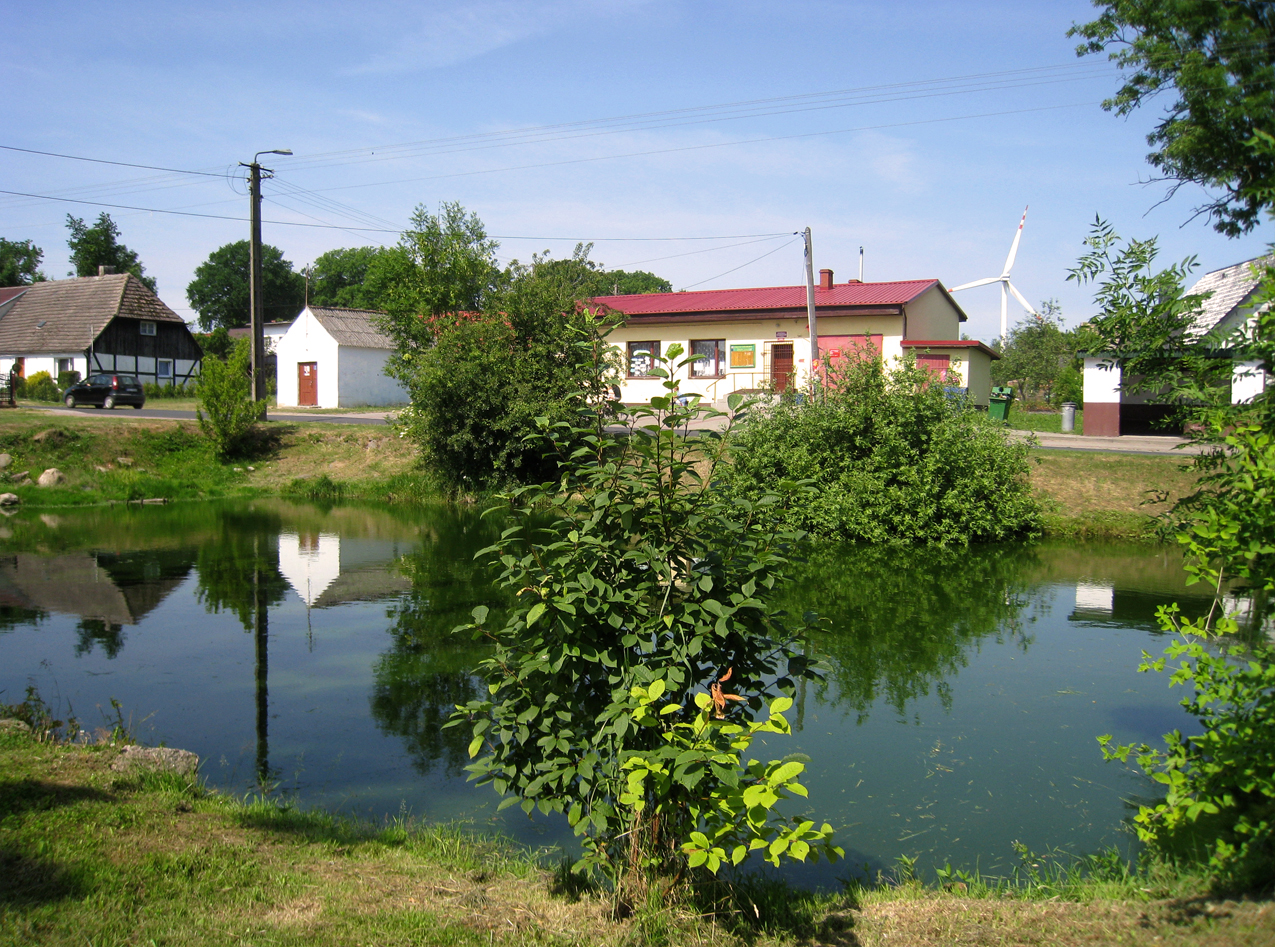
- Center of the village

- Location within Poland
- Coordinates: 54°26′49″N 16°26′0″E
- Country: Poland
- Voivodeship: West Pomeranian
- County: Sławno
- Gmina: Darłowo

Population
  - Total: 320

Cisowo [t͡ɕiˈsɔvɔ] (German: Zizow) is a village in the administrative district of Gmina Darłowo, within Sławno County, West Pomeranian Voivodeship, in north-western Poland. It lies approximately 4 km (2 mi) north of Darłowo, 19 km (12 mi) north-west of Sławno, and 167 km (104 mi) north-east of the regional capital Szczecin.

The village has a population of 320.
