= Dobiesław-Kolonia =

- Settlement
- Location within Poland
- Coordinates: 54°19′27″N 16°22′51″E
- Country: Poland
- Voivodeship: West Pomeranian
- County: Sławno
- Gmina: Darłowo

Dobiesław-Kolonia [dɔˈbjɛswaf kɔˈlɔɲa] is a settlement in the administrative district of Gmina Darłowo, within Sławno County, West Pomeranian Voivodeship, in north-western Poland. It lies approximately 11 km (7 mi) south of Darłowo, 21 km (13 mi) west of Sławno, and 156 km (97 mi) north-east of the regional capital Szczecin.

For the history of the region, see History of Pomerania.
