= Sińczyca =

- Village
- Location within Poland
- Coordinates: 54°24′15″N 16°29′37″E
- Country: Poland
- Voivodeship: West Pomeranian
- County: Sławno
- Gmina: Darłowo
- Population: 143

Sińczyca [ɕiɲˈt͡ʂɨt͡sa] (German: Schöningswalde) is a village in the administrative district of Gmina Darłowo, within Sławno County, West Pomeranian Voivodeship, in north-western Poland. It lies approximately 6 km (4 mi) east of Darłowo, 13 km (8 mi) west of Sławno, and 167 km (104 mi) north-east of the regional capital Szczecin.

For the history of the region, see History of Pomerania.

The village has a population of 143.
