= Słowinko =

- Settlement
- Location within Poland
- Coordinates: 54°22′18″N 16°31′2″E
- Country: Poland
- Voivodeship: West Pomeranian
- County: Sławno
- Gmina: Darłowo
- Population: 33

Słowinko [swɔˈvinkɔ] is a settlement in the administrative district of Gmina Darłowo, within Sławno County, West Pomeranian Voivodeship, in north-western Poland. It lies approximately 9 km (6 mi) south-east of Darłowo, 11 km (7 mi) west of Sławno, and 166 km (103 mi) north-east of the regional capital Szczecin.

For the history of the region, see History of Pomerania.

The settlement has a population of 33.
