= Kępka =

- Settlement
- Location within Poland
- Coordinates: 54°21′2″N 16°23′7″E
- Country: Poland
- Voivodeship: West Pomeranian
- County: Sławno
- Gmina: Darłowo
- Population: 2

Kępka [ˈkɛmpka] is a settlement in the administrative district of Gmina Darłowo, within Sławno County, West Pomeranian Voivodeship, in north-western Poland. It lies approximately 8 km (5 mi) south of Darłowo, 20 km (12 mi) west of Sławno, and 158 km (98 mi) north-east of the regional capital Szczecin.

For the history of the region, see History of Pomerania.

The settlement has a population of 2.
