= Leśnica, West Pomeranian Voivodeship =

Leśnica
- Settlement
- Location within Poland
- Coordinates: 54°21′32″N 16°21′0″E
- Country: Poland
- Voivodeship: West Pomeranian
- County: Sławno
- Gmina: Darłowo
- Population: 26

Leśnica [lɛɕˈnit͡sa] is a settlement in the administrative district of Gmina Darłowo, within Sławno County, West Pomeranian Voivodeship, in north-western Poland. It lies approximately 8 km (5 mi) south-west of Darłowo, 22 km (14 mi) west of Sławno, and 157 km (98 mi) north-east of the regional capital Szczecin.

For the history of the region, see History of Pomerania.

The settlement has a population of 26.
