= Jeżyczki =

- Village
- Location within Poland
- Coordinates: 54°20′39″N 16°23′41″E
- Country: Poland
- Voivodeship: West Pomeranian
- County: Sławno
- Gmina: Darłowo
- Population: 330

Jeżyczki [jɛˈʐɨt͡ʂki] (German: Neuenhagen, Abtei) is a village in the administrative district of Gmina Darłowo, within Sławno County, West Pomeranian Voivodeship, in north-western Poland. It lies approximately 9 km (6 mi) south of Darłowo, 19 km (12 mi) west of Sławno, and 158 km (98 mi) north-east of the regional capital Szczecin.

For the history of the region, see History of Pomerania.

The village has a population of 330.
