= Jeżyce, West Pomeranian Voivodeship =

Jeżyce
- Village
- Location within Poland
- Coordinates: 54°21′18″N 16°23′48″E
- Country: Poland
- Voivodeship: West Pomeranian
- County: Sławno
- Gmina: Darłowo
- Population: 272

Jeżyce [jɛˈʐɨt͡sɛ] (German: Altenhagen) is a village in the administrative district of Gmina Darłowo, within Sławno County, West Pomeranian Voivodeship, in north-western Poland. It lies approximately 7 km (4 mi) south of Darłowo, 19 km (12 mi) west of Sławno, and 159 km (99 mi) north-east of the regional capital Szczecin.

For the history of the region, see History of Pomerania.

The village has a population of 272.
