= Różkowo =

- Settlement
- Location within Poland
- Coordinates: 54°22′19″N 16°26′30″E
- Country: Poland
- Voivodeship: West Pomeranian
- County: Sławno
- Gmina: Darłowo

Różkowo [ruʂˈkɔvɔ] is a settlement in the administrative district of Gmina Darłowo, within Sławno County, West Pomeranian Voivodeship, in north-western Poland. It lies approximately 6 km (4 mi) south of Darłowo, 16 km (10 mi) west of Sławno, and 162 km (101 mi) north-east of the regional capital Szczecin.

For the history of the region, see History of Pomerania.
