= Dobiesław, Sławno County =

Dobiesław
- Village
- Location within Poland
- Coordinates: 54°19′3″N 16°21′9″E
- Country: Poland
- Voivodeship: West Pomeranian
- County: Sławno
- Gmina: Darłowo
- Population: 379

Dobiesław (Polish pronunciation: [dɔˈbjɛswaf]; German: Abtshagen) is a village in the administrative district of Gmina Darłowo, within Sławno County, West Pomeranian Voivodeship, in north-western Poland. It lies approximately 12 km (7 mi) south of Darłowo, 23 km (14 mi) west of Sławno, and 154 km (96 mi) north-east of the regional capital Szczecin.

For the history of the region, see History of Pomerania.

The village has a population of 379.
