= Gleźnówko =

- Village
- Location within Poland
- Coordinates: 54°19′25″N 16°18′32″E
- Country: Poland
- Voivodeship: West Pomeranian
- County: Sławno
- Gmina: Darłowo
- Population: 95

Gleźnówko [ɡlɛʑˈnufkɔ] is a village in the administrative district of Gmina Darłowo, within Sławno County, West Pomeranian Voivodeship, in north-western Poland. It lies approximately 13 km (8 mi) south-west of Darłowo, 25 km (16 mi) west of Sławno, and 152 km (94 mi) north-east of the regional capital Szczecin.

For the history of the region, see History of Pomerania.

The village has a population of 95.
