= Sulimice =

- Village
- Location within Poland
- Coordinates: 54°27′47″N 16°31′24″E
- Country: Poland
- Voivodeship: West Pomeranian
- County: Sławno
- Gmina: Darłowo
- Population: 130

Sulimice [suliˈmit͡sɛ] (German: Zillmitz) is a village in the administrative district of Gmina Darłowo, within Sławno County, West Pomeranian Voivodeship, in north-western Poland. It lies approximately 9 km (6 mi) north-east of Darłowo, 15 km (9 mi) north-west of Sławno, and 173 km (107 mi) north-east of the regional capital Szczecin.

For the history of the region, see History of Pomerania.

The village has a population of 130.
