= Stary Jarosław =

- Village
- Location within Poland
- Coordinates: 54°24′4″N 16°33′3″E
- Country: Poland
- Voivodeship: West Pomeranian
- County: Sławno
- Gmina: Darłowo
- Population: 481

Stary Jarosław (Polish pronunciation: [ˈstarɨ jaˈrɔswaf]; German: Alt Järshagen) is a village in the administrative district of Gmina Darłowo, within Sławno County, West Pomeranian Voivodeship, in north-western Poland. It lies approximately 9 km (6 mi) east of Darłowo, 10 km (6 mi) north-west of Sławno, and 170 km (106 mi) north-east of the regional capital Szczecin.

The village has a population of 481.

== History ==
The suffix -hagen of the historic village name is typical for settlements founded by Germans during Medieval Ostsiedlung. For the history of the region, see History of Pomerania.
