= Nowy Jarosław =

- Village
- Location within Poland
- Coordinates: 54°23′55″N 16°31′57″E
- Country: Poland
- Voivodeship: West Pomeranian
- County: Sławno
- Gmina: Darłowo
- Population: 196

Nowy Jarosław (Polish pronunciation: [ˈnɔvɨ jaˈrɔswaf]) (German: Neu Järshagen) is a village in the administrative district of Gmina Darłowo, within Sławno County, West Pomeranian Voivodeship, in north-western Poland. It lies approximately 8 km (5 mi) east of Darłowo, 11 km (7 mi) west of Sławno, and 168 km (104 mi) north-east of the regional capital Szczecin.

For the history of the region, see History of Pomerania.

The village has a population of 196.
