= Kopnica =

- Village
- Location within Poland
- Coordinates: 54°27′26″N 16°29′18″E
- Country: Poland
- Voivodeship: West Pomeranian
- County: Sławno
- Gmina: Darłowo
- Population: 120

Kopnica [kɔpˈnit͡sa] (German Köpnitz) is a village in the administrative district of Gmina Darłowo, within Sławno County, West Pomeranian Voivodeship, in north-western Poland. It lies approximately 7 km (4 mi) north-east of Darłowo, 17 km (11 mi) north-west of Sławno, and 171 km (106 mi) north-east of the regional capital Szczecin.

For the history of the region, see History of Pomerania.

The village has a population of 120.
