= Nowy Kraków, West Pomeranian Voivodeship =

Nowy Kraków
- Settlement
- Location within Poland
- Coordinates: 54°21′31″N 16°25′50″E
- Country: Poland
- Voivodeship: West Pomeranian
- County: Sławno
- Gmina: Darłowo
- Population: 25

Nowy Kraków [ˈnɔvɨ ˈkrakuf] is a settlement in the administrative district of Gmina Darłowo, within Sławno County, West Pomeranian Voivodeship, in north-western Poland. It lies approximately 7 km (4 mi) south of Darłowo, 17 km (11 mi) west of Sławno, and 161 km (100 mi) north-east of the regional capital Szczecin.

For the history of the region, see History of Pomerania.

The settlement has a population of 25.
