= Gmina Darłowo =

Gmina Darłowo Darłowo Commune
- Gmina
- Interactive map of Gmina Darłowo
- Coordinates (Darłowo): 54°25′N 16°25′E
- Country: Poland
- Voivodeship: West Pomeranian
- County: Sławno
- Seat: Darłowo

Area
  - Total: 269.84 km^{2} (104.19 sq mi)

Population (2006)
  - Total: 7,561
  - Density: 28.02/km^{2} (72.57/sq mi)
- Website: http://www.ugdarlowo.pl/

Gmina Darłowo is a rural gmina (administrative district) in Sławno County, West Pomeranian Voivodeship, in north-western Poland. Its seat is the town of Darłowo, although the town is not part of the territory of the gmina.

The gmina covers an area of 269.84 square kilometres (104.2 sq mi), and as of 2006 its total population is 7,561.

== Villages ==
Gmina Darłowo contains the villages and settlements of Barzowice, Bobolin, Boryszewo, Borzyszkowo, Bukowo Morskie, Cisowo, Czarnolas, Dąbki, Dąbkowice, Darłowiec, Dobiesław, Dobiesław-Kolonia, Domasławice, Drozdowo, Gleźnówko, Gleźnowo, Gorzebądz, Jeżyce, Jeżyczki, Jeżyczki-Kolonia, Kępka, Kopań, Kopnica, Kowalewice, Kowalewiczki, Krupy, Leśnica, Nowy Jarosław, Nowy Kraków, Palczewice, Pęciszewko, Porzecze, Różkowo, Rusko, Sińczyca, Słowinko, Słowino, Spławie, Stary Jarosław, Sulimice, Trzmielewo, Wicie, Wiekowice, Wiekowo, Zagórzyn, Zakrzewo (including Zakrzewo Dolne and Zakrzewo Górne), Zielnowo and Żukowo Morskie.

== Neighbouring gminas ==
Gmina Darłowo is bordered by the town of Darłowo and by the gminas of Malechowo, Mielno, Postomino, Sianów and Sławno.
