= Spławie, Sławno County =

Spławie
- Settlement
- Location within Poland
- Coordinates: 54°24′22″N 16°27′54″E
- Country: Poland
- Voivodeship: West Pomeranian
- County: Sławno
- Gmina: Darłowo

Spławie [ˈspwavjɛ] is a settlement in the administrative district of Gmina Darłowo, within Sławno County, West Pomeranian Voivodeship, in north-western Poland. It lies approximately 4 km (2 mi) east of Darłowo, 15 km (9 mi) west of Sławno, and 166 km (103 mi) north-east of the regional capital Szczecin.

For the history of the region, see History of Pomerania.
