= Gorzebądz, Sławno County =

Gorzebądz
- Settlement
- Location within Poland
- Coordinates: 54°23′22″N 16°31′13″E
- Country: Poland
- Voivodeship: West Pomeranian
- County: Sławno
- Gmina: Darłowo
- Population: 15

Gorzebądz [ɡɔˈʐɛbɔnt͡s] is a settlement in the administrative district of Gmina Darłowo, within Sławno County, West Pomeranian Voivodeship, in north-western Poland. It lies approximately 8 km (5 mi) south-east of Darłowo, 11 km (7 mi) west of Sławno, and 167 km (104 mi) north-east of the regional capital Szczecin.

For the history of the region, see History of Pomerania.

The settlement has a population of 15.
