= Żukowo Morskie =

- Village
- Location within Poland
- Coordinates: 54°24′14″N 16°22′28″E
- Country: Poland
- Voivodeship: West Pomeranian
- County: Sławno
- Gmina: Darłowo
- Population: 138

Żukowo Morskie [ʐuˈkɔvɔ ˈmɔrskʲɛ] (German: See Suckow) is a village in the administrative district of Gmina Darłowo, within Sławno County, West Pomeranian Voivodeship, in north-western Poland. It lies approximately 4 km (2 mi) south-west of Darłowo, 21 km (13 mi) west of Sławno, and 161 km (100 mi) north-east of the regional capital Szczecin.

The village has a population of 138.
