= Borzyszkowo, West Pomeranian Voivodeship =

Borzyszkowo
- Village
- Location within Poland
- Coordinates: 54°26′3″N 16°32′37″E
- Country: Poland
- Voivodeship: West Pomeranian
- County: Sławno
- Gmina: Darłowo
- Population: 56

Borzyszkowo [bɔʐɨʂˈkɔvɔ] is a village in the administrative district of Gmina Darłowo, within Sławno County, West Pomeranian Voivodeship, in north-western Poland. It lies approximately 9 km (6 mi) east of Darłowo, 12 km (7 mi) north-west of Sławno, and 172 km (107 mi) north-east of the regional capital Szczecin.

For the history of the region, see History of Pomerania.

The village has a population of 56.
