= Dąbkowice, West Pomeranian Voivodeship =

Dąbkowice
- Settlement
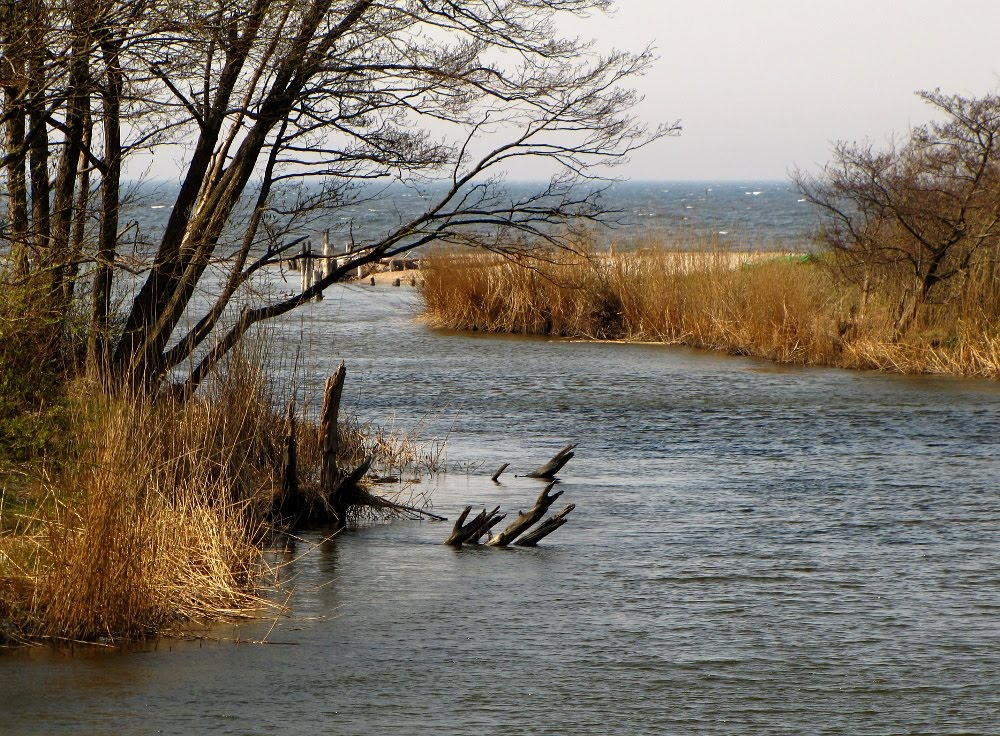
- Canal between the Baltic Sea and Lake Bukowo

- Location within Poland
- Coordinates: 54°20′26″N 16°14′59″E
- Country: Poland
- Voivodeship: West Pomeranian
- County: Sławno
- Gmina: Darłowo
- Population: 1
- Time zone: UTC+1 (CET)
  - Summer (DST): UTC+2 (CEST)
- Vehicle registration: ZSL

Dąbkowice [dɔmpkɔˈvit͡sɛ] is a settlement in the administrative district of Gmina Darłowo, within Sławno County, West Pomeranian Voivodeship, in north-western Poland. It lies approximately 14 km (9 mi) south-west of Darłowo, 29 km (18 mi) west of Sławno, and 150 km (93 mi) north-east of the regional capital Szczecin. It is located on the Slovincian Coast between the Baltic Sea in the north-west and Lake Bukowo in the south-east.

The settlement has a population of 1.
