= Dąbki, West Pomeranian Voivodeship =

Dąbki
- Spa village
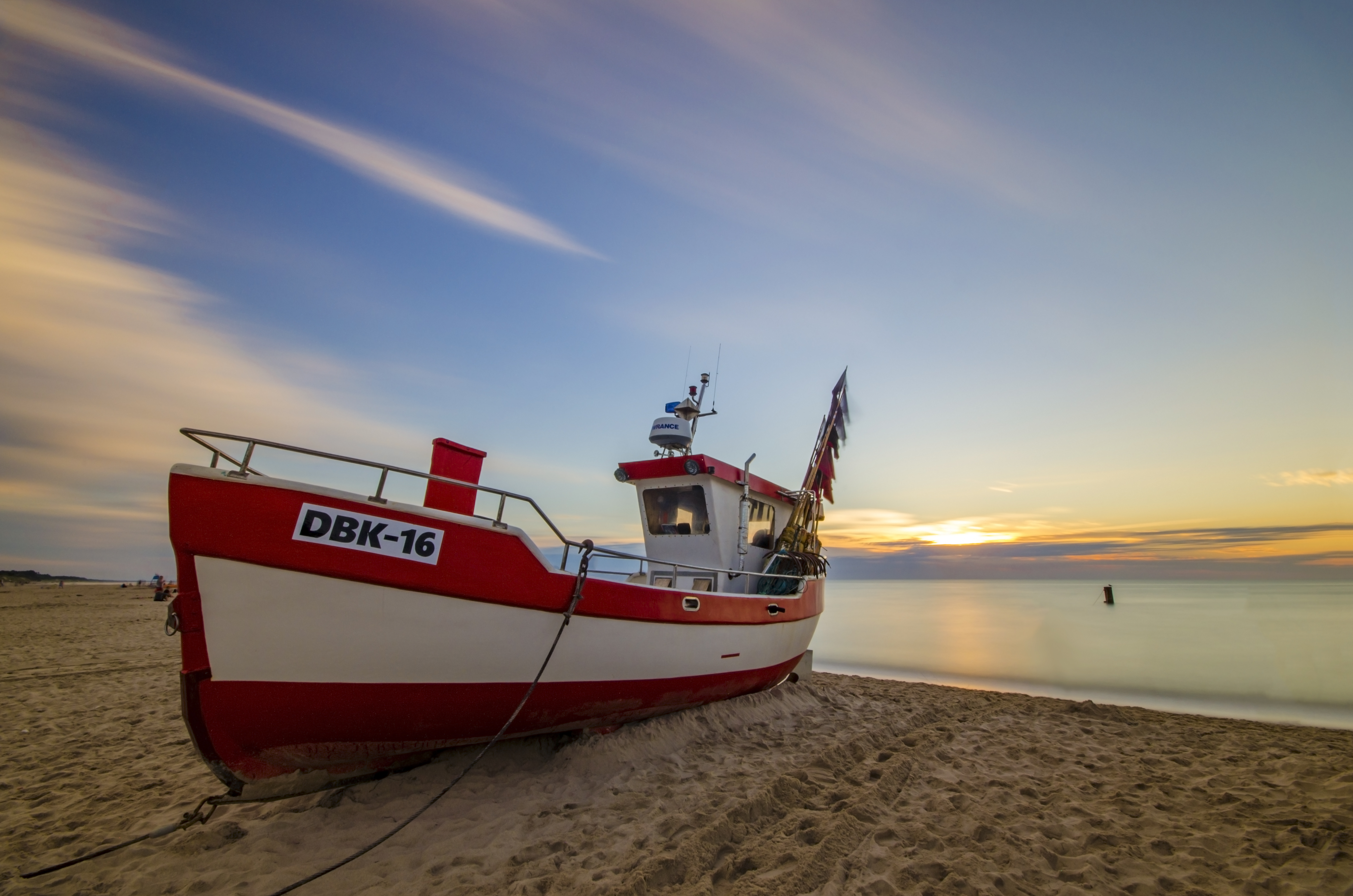
- A local fishing boat on the coast

- Location within Poland
- Coordinates: 54°22′52″N 16°18′59″E
- Country: Poland
- Voivodeship: West Pomeranian
- County: Sławno
- Gmina: Darłowo
- Population: 265
- Time zone: UTC+1 (CET)
  - Summer (DST): UTC+2 (CEST)
- Vehicle registration: ZSL
- Website: http://www.dabki.pl/

Dąbki [ˈdɔmpki] (German: Neuwasser) is a spa village in the administrative district of Gmina Darłowo, within Sławno County, West Pomeranian Voivodeship, in north-western Poland. It lies approximately 8 km (5 mi) south-west of Darłowo, 24 km (15 mi) west of Sławno, and 157 km (98 mi) north-east of the regional capital Szczecin. It is located on the Slovincian Coast.

The village has a population of 265.
