= Bobolin =

Bobolin refers to the following places in Poland:

- Bobolin, Police County
- Bobolin, Sławno County
