= Trzmielewo, West Pomeranian Voivodeship =

Trzmielewo
- Settlement
- Location within Poland
- Coordinates: 54°26′33″N 16°25′42″E
- Country: Poland
- Voivodeship: West Pomeranian
- County: Sławno
- Gmina: Darłowo
- Population: 20

Trzmielewo [tʂmjɛˈlɛvɔ] is a settlement in the administrative district of Gmina Darłowo, within Sławno County, West Pomeranian Voivodeship, in north-western Poland. It lies approximately 3 km (2 mi) north of Darłowo, 19 km (12 mi) north-west of Sławno, and 167 km (104 mi) north-east of the regional capital Szczecin.

For the history of the region, see History of Pomerania.

The settlement has a population of 20.
