= Jeżyczki-Kolonia =

- Settlement
- Location within Poland
- Coordinates: 54°20′11″N 16°24′39″E
- Country: Poland
- Voivodeship: West Pomeranian
- County: Sławno
- Gmina: Darłowo

Jeżyczki-Kolonia [jɛˈʐɨt͡ʂki kɔˈlɔɲa] is a settlement in the administrative district of Gmina Darłowo, within Sławno County, West Pomeranian Voivodeship, in north-western Poland. It lies approximately 9 km (6 mi) south of Darłowo, 18 km (11 mi) west of Sławno, and 158 km (98 mi) north-east of the regional capital Szczecin.

For the history of the region, see History of Pomerania.
