= Porzecze, Sławno County =

Porzecze
- Village
- Location within Poland
- Coordinates: 54°22′42″N 16°24′4″E
- Country: Poland
- Voivodeship: West Pomeranian
- County: Sławno
- Gmina: Darłowo
- Population: 180

Porzecze [pɔˈʐɛt͡ʂɛ] (German Preetz) is a village in the administrative district of Gmina Darłowo, within Sławno County, West Pomeranian Voivodeship, in north-western Poland. It lies approximately 5 km (3 mi) south of Darłowo, 19 km (12 mi) west of Sławno, and 160 km (99 mi) north-east of the regional capital Szczecin.

For the history of the region, see History of Pomerania.

The village has a population of 180.
