= Zagorzyn =

Zagorzyn may refer to the following places in Poland:

- Zagorzyn, Greater Poland Voivodeship (west-central Poland)
- Zagorzyn, Lesser Poland Voivodeship (south Poland)
- Zagórzyn, West Pomeranian Voivodeship (north-west Poland)
