= Wicie, West Pomeranian Voivodeship =

Wicie
- Village
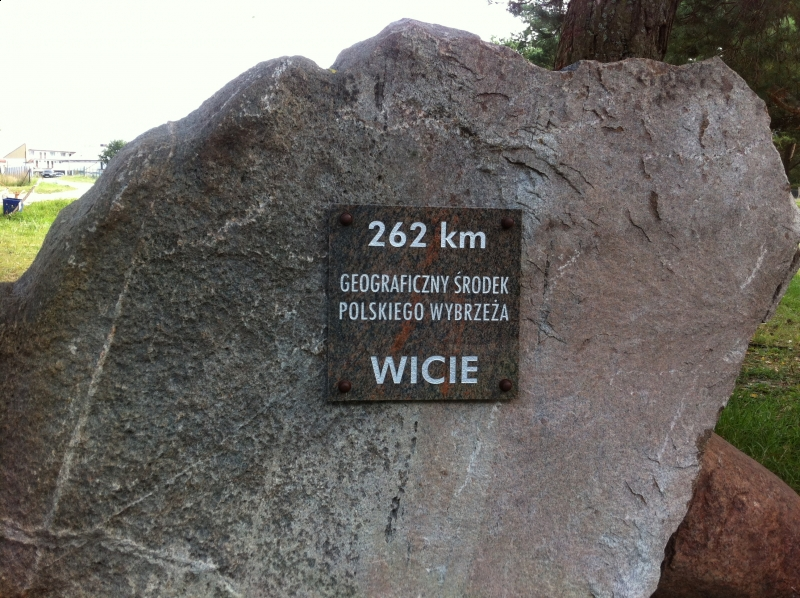
- Wicie - geographical centre of the Polish coast

- Location within Poland
- Coordinates: 54°30′N 16°28′E
- Country: Poland
- Voivodeship: West Pomeranian
- County: Sławno
- Gmina: Darłowo
- Population: 42

Wicie [ˈvit͡ɕɛ] (German: Vitte) is a village in the administrative district of Gmina Darłowo, within Sławno County, West Pomeranian Voivodeship, in north-western Poland. It lies approximately 10 km (6 mi) north of Darłowo, 21 km (13 mi) north-west of Sławno, and 173 km (107 mi) north-east of the regional capital Szczecin. The village has a population of 42.
