= Zakrzewo, West Pomeranian Voivodeship =

Zakrzewo
- Village
- Location within Poland
- Coordinates: 54°27′1″N 16°28′28″E
- Country: Poland
- Voivodeship: West Pomeranian
- County: Sławno
- Gmina: Darłowo
- Population: 201

Zakrzewo [zaˈkʂɛvɔ] (German: Sackshöhe) is a village in the administrative district of Gmina Darłowo, within Sławno County, West Pomeranian Voivodeship, in north-western Poland. It lies approximately 6 km (4 mi) north-east of Darłowo, 17 km (11 mi) north-west of Sławno, and 169 km (105 mi) north-east of the regional capital Szczecin. The sołectwo of Zakrzewo includes two parts known as Zakrzewo Dolne ("Lower Zakrzewo") and Zakrzewo Górne ("Upper Zakrzewo").

For the history of the region, see History of Pomerania.

The village has a population of 201.
