= Wiekowo, West Pomeranian Voivodeship =

Wiekowo
- Village
- Location within Poland
- Coordinates: 54°17′40″N 16°21′51″E
- Country: Poland
- Voivodeship: West Pomeranian
- County: Sławno
- Gmina: Darłowo
- Population: 212

Wiekowo [vjɛˈkɔvɔ] is a village in the administrative district of Gmina Darłowo, within Sławno County, West Pomeranian Voivodeship, in north-western Poland. It lies approximately 14 km (9 mi) south of Darłowo, 23 km (14 mi) west of Sławno, and 153 km (95 mi) north-east of the regional capital Szczecin.

For the history of the region, see History of Pomerania.

The village has a population of 212.
