= Czarnolas, West Pomeranian Voivodeship =

Czarnolas
- Settlement
- Location within Poland
- Coordinates: 54°19′46″N 16°25′42″E
- Country: Poland
- Voivodeship: West Pomeranian
- County: Sławno
- Gmina: Darłowo
- Population: 3

Czarnolas [t͡ʂarˈnɔlas] is a settlement in the administrative district of Gmina Darłowo, within Sławno County, West Pomeranian Voivodeship, in north-western Poland. It lies approximately 10 km (6 mi) south of Darłowo, 18 km (11 mi) west of Sławno, and 158 km (98 mi) north-east of the regional capital Szczecin.

For the history of the region, see History of Pomerania.

The settlement has a population of 3.

== Demographics ==
Czarnolas is a small settlement with a population that reflects the rural character of the area. As of recent data, it is sparsely populated, with residents primarily engaged in agriculture, forestry, and local trades.
