= Boryszewo =

- Village
- Location within Poland
- Coordinates: 54°20′23″N 16°21′53″E
- Country: Poland
- Voivodeship: West Pomeranian
- County: Sławno
- Gmina: Darłowo
- Population: 184

Boryszewo [bɔrɨˈʂɛvɔ] (German Büssow) is a village in the administrative district of Gmina Darłowo, within Sławno County, West Pomeranian Voivodeship, in north-western Poland. It lies approximately 10 km (6 mi) south of Darłowo, 21 km (13 mi) west of Sławno, and 156 km (97 mi) north-east of the regional capital Szczecin.

The village has a population of 184.

== See also ==
History of Pomerania
