= Krupy, West Pomeranian Voivodeship =

Krupy
- Village
- Location within Poland
- Coordinates: 54°25′23″N 16°30′45″E
- Country: Poland
- Voivodeship: West Pomeranian
- County: Sławno
- Gmina: Darłowo
- Population: 361

Krupy [ˈkrupɨ] (German: Grupenhagen) is a village in the administrative district of Gmina Darłowo, within Sławno County, West Pomeranian Voivodeship, in north-western Poland. It lies approximately 7 km (4 mi) east of Darłowo, 13 km (8 mi) north-west of Sławno, and 169 km (105 mi) north-east of the regional capital Szczecin.

The village has a population of 361.

For the history of the region, see History of Pomerania.
