= Darłowiec =

- Settlement
- Location within Poland
- Coordinates: 54°24′4″N 16°26′48″E
- Country: Poland
- Voivodeship: West Pomeranian
- County: Sławno
- Gmina: Darłowo
- Population: 14

Darłowiec [darˈwɔvjɛt͡s] is a settlement in the administrative district of Gmina Darłowo, within Sławno County, West Pomeranian Voivodeship, in northwestern Poland. It is approximately 3 km (2 mi) southeast of Darłowo, 16 km (10 mi) west of Sławno, and 164 km (102 mi) northeast of the regional capital Szczecin.

For the region's history, see History of Pomerania.

The settlement has a population of 14.
