= Kopań, West Pomeranian Voivodeship =

Kopań
- Village
- Location within Poland
- Coordinates: 54°27′30″N 16°25′57″E
- Country: Poland
- Voivodeship: West Pomeranian
- County: Sławno
- Gmina: Darłowo
- Population: 132
- Website: http://www.kopan.pl

Kopań [ˈkɔpaɲ] (German Kopahn) is a village in the administrative district of Gmina Darłowo, within Sławno County, West Pomeranian Voivodeship, in north-western Poland. It lies approximately 5 km (3 mi) north of Darłowo, 20 km (12 mi) north-west of Sławno, and 168 km (104 mi) north-east of the regional capital Szczecin.

For the history of the region, see History of Pomerania.

The village has a population of 132.

In the Communist era, a nuclear power plant was proposed near the village, alongside two others at Zarnowiec and Lubiatowo. However, the nuclear plant in Kopań and Łobiatowo never came to fruition, and the one near Żarnowiec was cancelled and abandoned roughly halfway through construction.
