= Słowino =

- Village
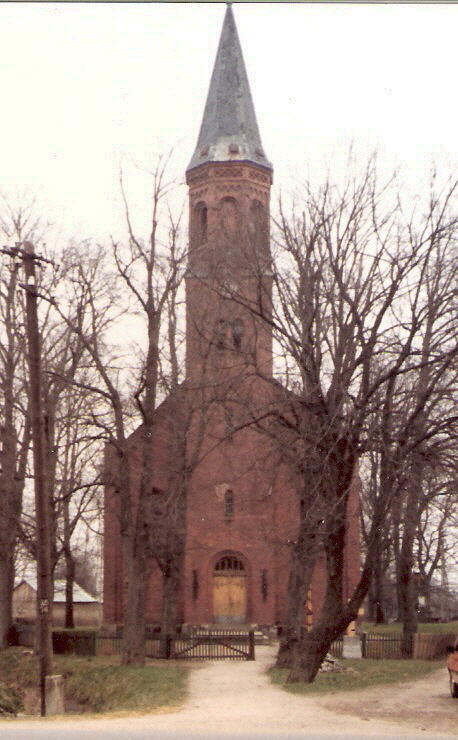
- Exaltation of the Holy Cross church

- Location within Poland
- Coordinates: 54°21′30″N 16°30′51″E
- Country: Poland
- Voivodeship: West Pomeranian
- County: Sławno
- Gmina: Darłowo
- Population: 410
- Time zone: UTC+1 (CET)
  - Summer (DST): UTC+2 (CEST)
- Vehicle registration: ZSL

Słowino [swɔˈvinɔ] (German: Schlawin) is a village in the administrative district of Gmina Darłowo, within Sławno County, West Pomeranian Voivodeship, in north-western Poland. It lies approximately 10 km (6 mi) south-east of Darłowo, 12 km (7 mi) west of Sławno, and 165 km (103 mi) north-east of the regional capital Szczecin. It is located in the historic region of Pomerania.

The village has a population of 410.
