= Zielnowo, West Pomeranian Voivodeship =

Zielnowo
- Village
- Location within Poland
- Coordinates: 54°26′1″N 16°29′16″E
- Country: Poland
- Voivodeship: West Pomeranian
- County: Sławno
- Gmina: Darłowo
- Population: 71

Zielnowo [ʑɛlˈnɔvɔ] (formerly German Zielnitz or Sellen) is a village in the administrative district of Gmina Darłowo, within Sławno County, West Pomeranian Voivodeship, in north-western Poland. It lies approximately 5 km (3 mi) east of Darłowo, 15 km (9 mi) north-west of Sławno, and 169 km (105 mi) north-east of the regional capital Szczecin.

For the history of the region, see History of Pomerania.

Zielnowo has a population of 71. Politician Andrzej Lepper owned a farm in the village.
