= Zagórzyn, West Pomeranian Voivodeship =

Zagórzyn
- Village
- Location within Poland
- Coordinates: 54°22′41″N 16°27′29″E
- Country: Poland
- Voivodeship: West Pomeranian
- County: Sławno
- Gmina: Darłowo
- Population: 73

Zagórzyn [zaˈɡuʐɨn] is a village in the administrative district of Gmina Darłowo, within Sławno County, West Pomeranian Voivodeship, in north-western Poland. It lies approximately 6 km (4 mi) south-east of Darłowo, 15 km (9 mi) west of Sławno, and 163 km (101 mi) north-east of the regional capital Szczecin.

For the history of the region, see History of Pomerania.

The village has a population of 73.
