= Bobolin, Sławno County =

Bobolin
- Village
- Location within Poland
- Coordinates: 54°23′42″N 16°20′54″E
- Country: Poland
- Voivodeship: West Pomeranian
- County: Sławno
- Gmina: Darłowo
- Population: 119+

Bobolin [bɔˈbɔlin] (German: Böbbelin) is a village in the administrative district of Gmina Darłowo, within Sławno County, West Pomeranian Voivodeship, in north-western Poland. It lies approximately 6 km (4 mi) south-west of Darłowo, 22 km (14 mi) west of Sławno, and 159 km (99 mi) north-east of the regional capital Szczecin.

For the history of the region, see History of Pomerania.

The village has a population of 119.
