= Domasławice, West Pomeranian Voivodeship =

Domasławice
- Village
- Location within Poland
- Coordinates: 54°23′29″N 16°25′52″E
- Country: Poland
- Voivodeship: West Pomeranian
- County: Sławno
- Gmina: Darłowo
- Population: 450

Domasławice [dɔmaswaˈvit͡sɛ] (German Damshagen) is a village in the administrative district of Gmina Darłowo, within Sławno County, West Pomeranian Voivodeship, in north-western Poland. It lies approximately 3 km (2 mi) south of Darłowo, 17 km (11 mi) west of Sławno, and 163 km (101 mi) north-east of the regional capital Szczecin.

For the history of the region, see History of Pomerania.

The village has a population of 450.
