= Rusko, West Pomeranian Voivodeship =

Rusko
- Village
- Location within Poland
- Coordinates: 54°23′54″N 16°24′42″E
- Country: Poland
- Voivodeship: West Pomeranian
- County: Sławno
- Gmina: Darłowo
- Population: 221

Rusko [ˈruskɔ] (formerly German Rußhagen) is a village in the administrative district of Gmina Darłowo, within Sławno County, West Pomeranian Voivodeship, in north-western Poland. It lies approximately 3 km (2 mi) south of Darłowo, 18 km (11 mi) west of Sławno, and 162 km (101 mi) north-east of the regional capital Szczecin.

For the history of the region, see History of Pomerania.

The village has a population of 221.
