= National road 36 (Poland) =

National road in Poland

Route information
- Maintained by GDDKiA
- Length: 150 km (93 mi)
- Existed: 2000–present

Major junctions
- From: Prochowice
- To: Ostrów Wielkopolski

Location
- Country: Poland
- Regions: Lower Silesian Voivodeship; Greater Poland Voivodeship
- Major cities: Lubin, Rawicz, Krotoszyn, Ostrów Wielkopolski

Highway system
- National roads in Poland; Voivodeship roads
← DK 35	→ DK 37

National road 36 (Polish: Droga krajowa nr 36) is an about 150 km long G class and GP class national road connecting Prochowice in Lower Silesian Voivodeship with Ostrów Wielkopolski in Greater Poland Voivodeship.
