= Darłowo Castle =

Castle of the Pomeranian Dukes
- Zamek Książąt Pomorskich (Polish)
- Darłowo Castle
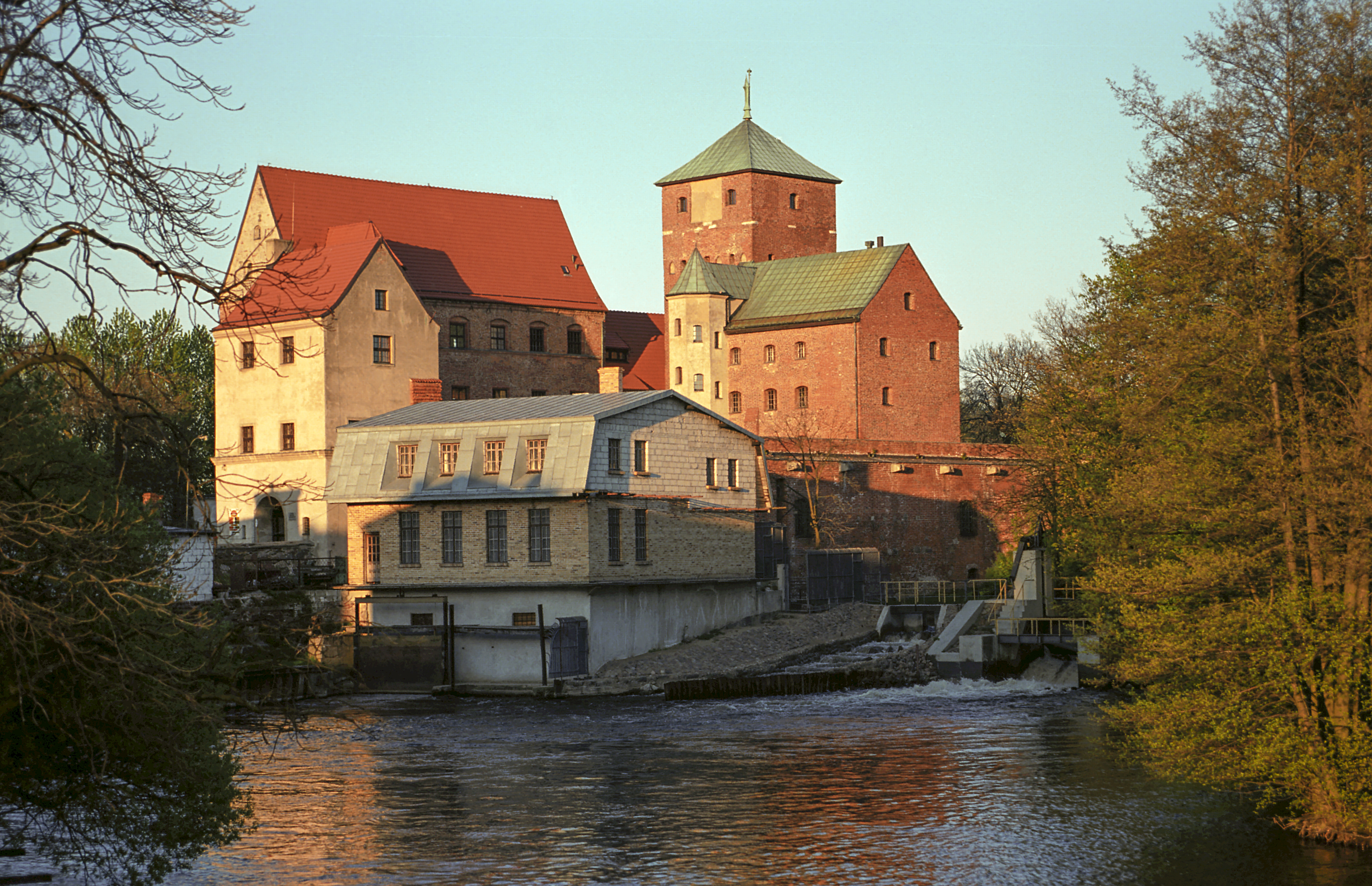
- Castle of the Pomeranian Dukes

- Location of the castle in Poland
- 54°25′11″N 16°24′43″E
- Location: Darłowo, West Pomeranian Voivodeship, Poland

History
- Built: 1352
- Rebuilt: 1449–1459

Site notes
- Architectural style: Gothic

The Castle of the Pomeranian Dukes (Polish: Zamek Książąt Pomorskich), often simply known as Darłowo Castle (Zamek w Darłowie), the only Gothic castle located in Darłowo, on the Polish coast of the Baltic Sea. The castle's layout is close to that of a square, with a tower measuring 24 metres in height. The castle's construction began in 1352, in the reign of Bogislaw V, whose reign began the alliance with the Hanseatic League. In the eighteenth and nineteenth centuries the castle was used as a warehouse and a prison. In 1930, the castle was turned into a museum.

== History ==
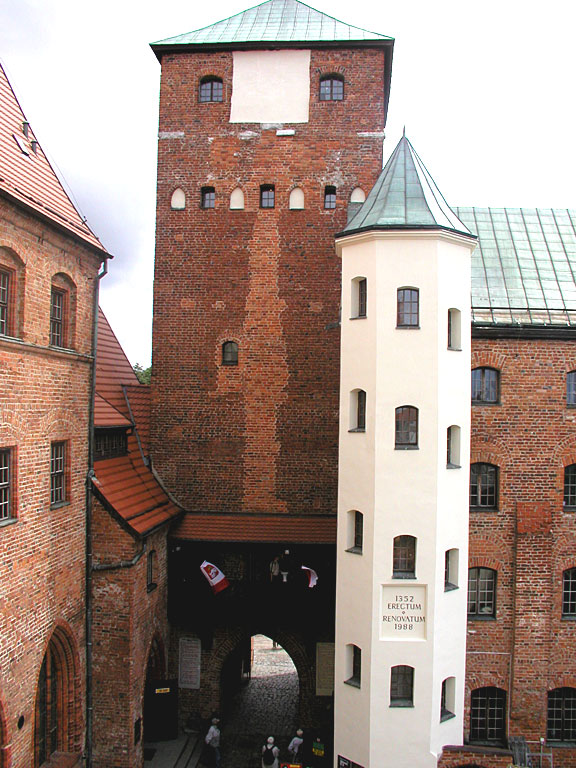
View on the courtyard in the Castle of the Pomeranian Dukes

The Castle of the Pomeranian Dukes was built during the second half of the fourteenth century, in 1352. It was constructed during the reign of Bogislaw V and Elizabeth of Poland, the daughter of Casimir III the Great. Although this was only a secondary residence of the House of Pomerania, the castle was enlarged and modernised in the fifteenth and sixteenth century, becoming a worthy royal residence. The town of Darłowo was given the title of "The Royal City of Darłowo" (Królewskie Miasto Darłowo).

The greatest expansion of the castle was done under the reign of Eric of Pomerania, who rebuilt the castle to that of the design of his previous residence, Kronborg Castle. He also modernised the castle's defensive fortifications, and built a second defence line, in the form of dikes around the castle. The following expansion of the castle was done under the reign of Duke Bogislaw X, when a new wing was built. The next changes were done by Duke Barnim XI. After a great fire, which devastated the castle in 1624, the last Duke of the House of Pomerania, Bogislaw XIV, rebuilt the castle. However, he did not restore the castle to its original architectural style. The castle lost many of its defences, and a chapel was built inside the Duke Hall. After the duke's death, his widow, Duchess Elisabeth of Schleswig-Holstein-Sonderburg, took over the castle, and lived there until her death.

== See also ==
- List of castles in Poland
