= Stanisław Flejterski =

Polish Economist & Professor

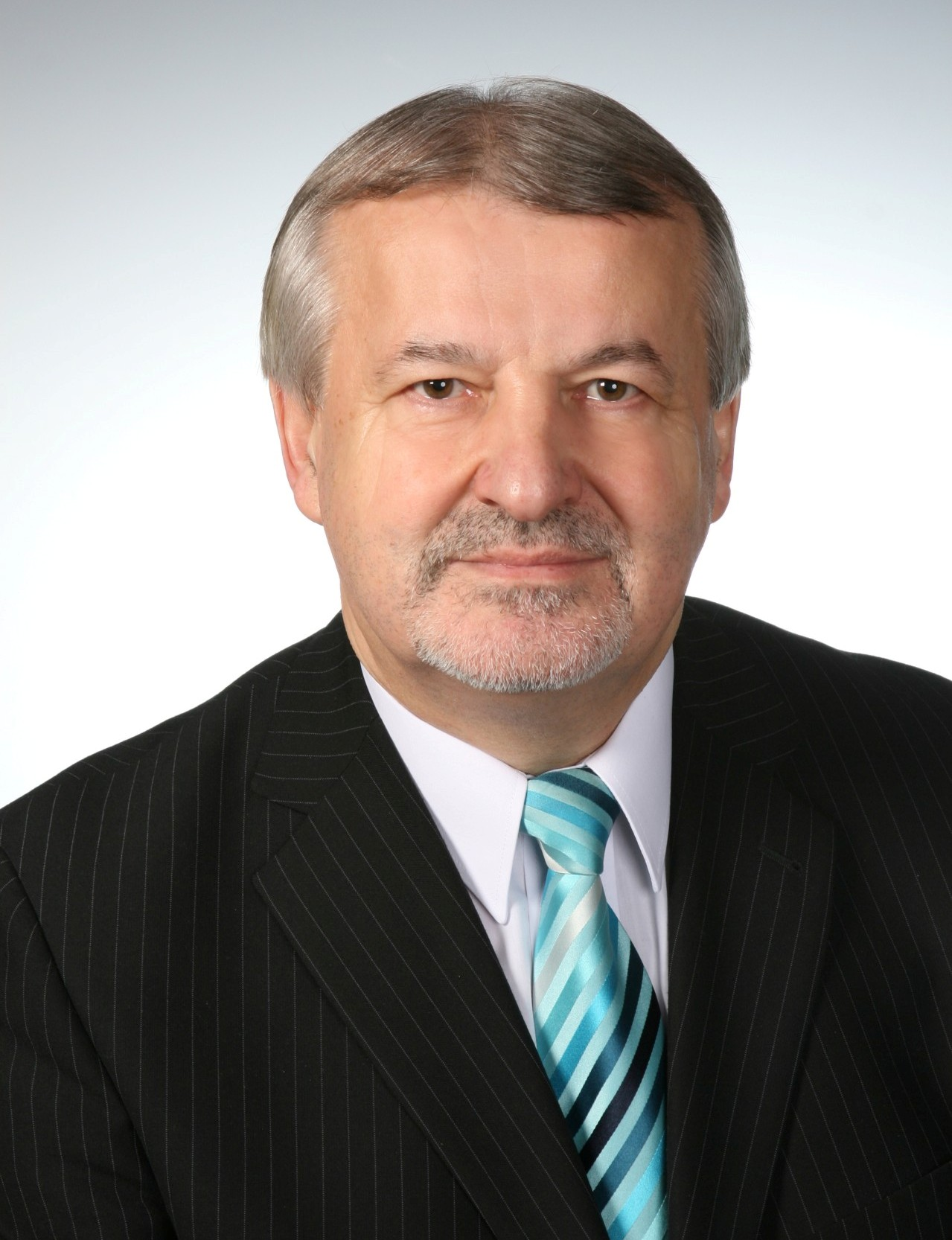
- Born: Tomaszów, Poland
- Education: Faculty of Engineering-Economics of Transport Politechnique of Szczecin
- Awards: Knight’s Order of Poland’s Rebirth, Gold and Silver Cross of Merit, Medal of the National Board of Education
- Scientific career
- Workplaces: Faculty of Management and Economics of Services of the University of Szczecin

Signature
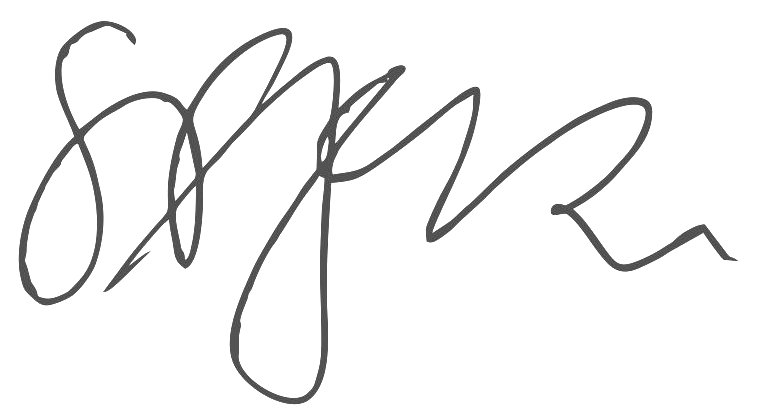

Stanisław Flejterski (born September 10, 1948, in Tomaszów, Poland) is a Polish economist and professor of economic sciences. He is employed as full professor at Szczecin University.

== Biography ==
In 1966 he graduated from the Stefan Żeromski General Secondary School at Darłowo. In 1970 he graduated (M.A.) with distinction from the Transport and Economic Department of the Szczecin Polytechnic. W 1974 he defended a doctorate dissertation at the same department. In 1998 he received his postdoctoral degree (habilitation). For his postdoctoral dissertation in 1999 he received the award of the Commercial Bank in Warsaw SA . He has been titular professor since 2007. His professor's monograph on the basics of finance methodology was awarded with a prize of the Minister of Science and Higher Education.

=== Scientific visits ===
He did scientific apprenticeship at universities in Zurich, Amsterdam and Berlin, bank apprenticeship at the Banca Nazionale del Lavoro in Rome, study periods at financial institutions of New York City. He participated in many international conferences, delivered guest lectures in numerous countries.

=== Work in academic centers ===
In 1974–1977 he was chairman of the District Council of Young Science Workers in Szczecin. In 1985 he was the secretary of Szczecin University's Organizational Commission. In 1985–1988 he was director of Szczecin University's Centre of Research on Southern Countries. In 1999–2005 he was vice-dean for matters of science at the Faculty of Management and Service Economics. Since 1999 he has been head of the chair of Banking and Comparative Finances.

=== Membership in economic organizations ===
In 2007–2011 he was member of the Economic Sciences Committee and Financial Sciences Committee of the Polish Academy of Sciences. Member of the Szczecin Scientific Society, Polish Finances and Banking Association, SUERF (The European Money and Finance Forum). Chairman of the Polish Society for Programme of Neurologic.

=== Financial experiences ===
In 1991–1999 he performed managerial functions at the Bank PEKAO SA, BIG SA and Bank Austria Creditanstalt SA. For many years he has been chairman of supervisory councils of the Fund Supporting the City of Szczecin and the Szczecin Guarantee Fund.

The author and editor of over 30 books, nearly 500 papers and reports in a number of languages, numerous essays and columns, moreover expert reports and reviews. He specializes in banking, financial markets, international finances, comparative finances and the methodology of finances

== Others ==
He has promoted 10 Doctors of economic sciences.

== Awards ==
In December 2005 he was awarded the Knight's Order of Poland's Rebirth. He also has a Gold and Silver Cross of Merit, Medal of the National Board of Education, Medal for Merits in Creating the University of Szczecin, Golden SZSP Award, Silver PTE Award, Radio Szczecin Golden Award, Honorary Lions Club International Award, Eryk Pomorski Award for Merits for the Royal Town of Darłowo, Patron of Szczecin Culture (1996).

== Family ==
He is married, has a son, two daughters and a grandson.

== Selected publications ==
- Różnicowanie struktur we współczesnej bankowości, 1999, 2002 (Differentiating Structures in Modern Banking)
- Ekonomia globalna. Synteza (co-author), 2003 (Global Economy. A Synthesis)
- Niemiecki system bankowy (co-author), 2004 (The German Banking System)
- Współczesna ekonomika usług (co-author), 2005 (Contemporary Service Economics)
- Instytucje i usługi poręczeniowe na rynku finansowym ( co-author), 2005 (Guarantee Institutions and Services)
- Elementy finansów i bankowości (co-author), 2006 (Elements of Finances and Banking)
- Fundusze i usługi pożyczkowe dla mikro małych i średnich przedsiębiorstw (co-author),2006 (Loan Funds and Services for Small and Medium Companies)
- Podstawy metodologii finansów. Elementy komparatystyki, 2006 (Basics of Finance Methodology. Elements of Comparative Studies)
- Metodologia finansów. Podręcznik akademicki, 2007 (Methodology of Finances. A Handbook for Students)
- Bankowo-finansowa obsługa jednostek samorządu terytorialnego (co-author), 2008 (Banking and Financial Service of Local Government Units)
- Wielkie miasta, aglomeracje, metropolie(editor and co-author), 2009 (Large Cities, Urban Agglomerations, Metropolis)

== Sources ==
- Stanislaw Flejterski in Scientists’ portal nauka-polska.pl (OPI) (in Polish)
