= Darłowo =

Town in West Pomeranian Voivodeship, Poland

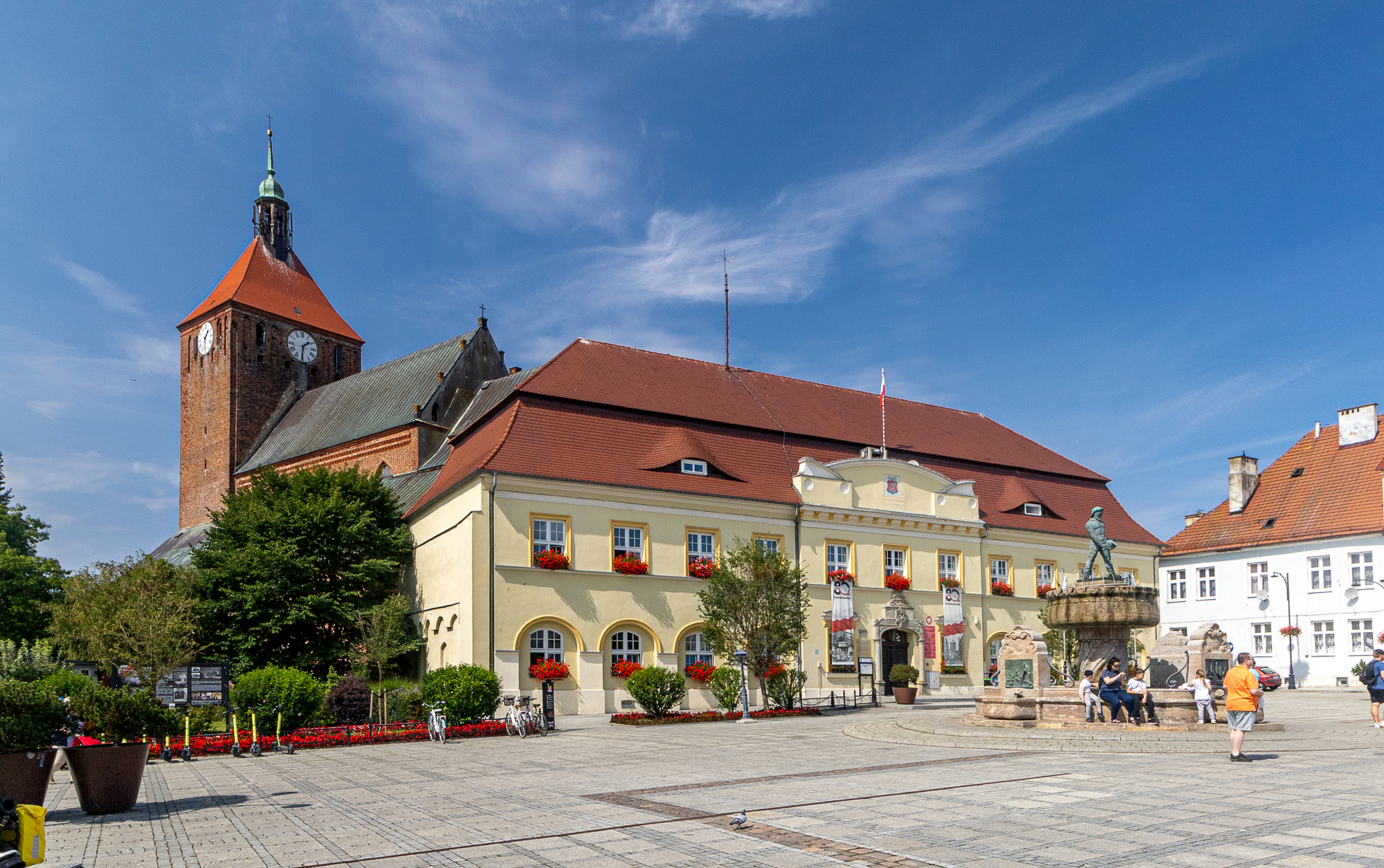
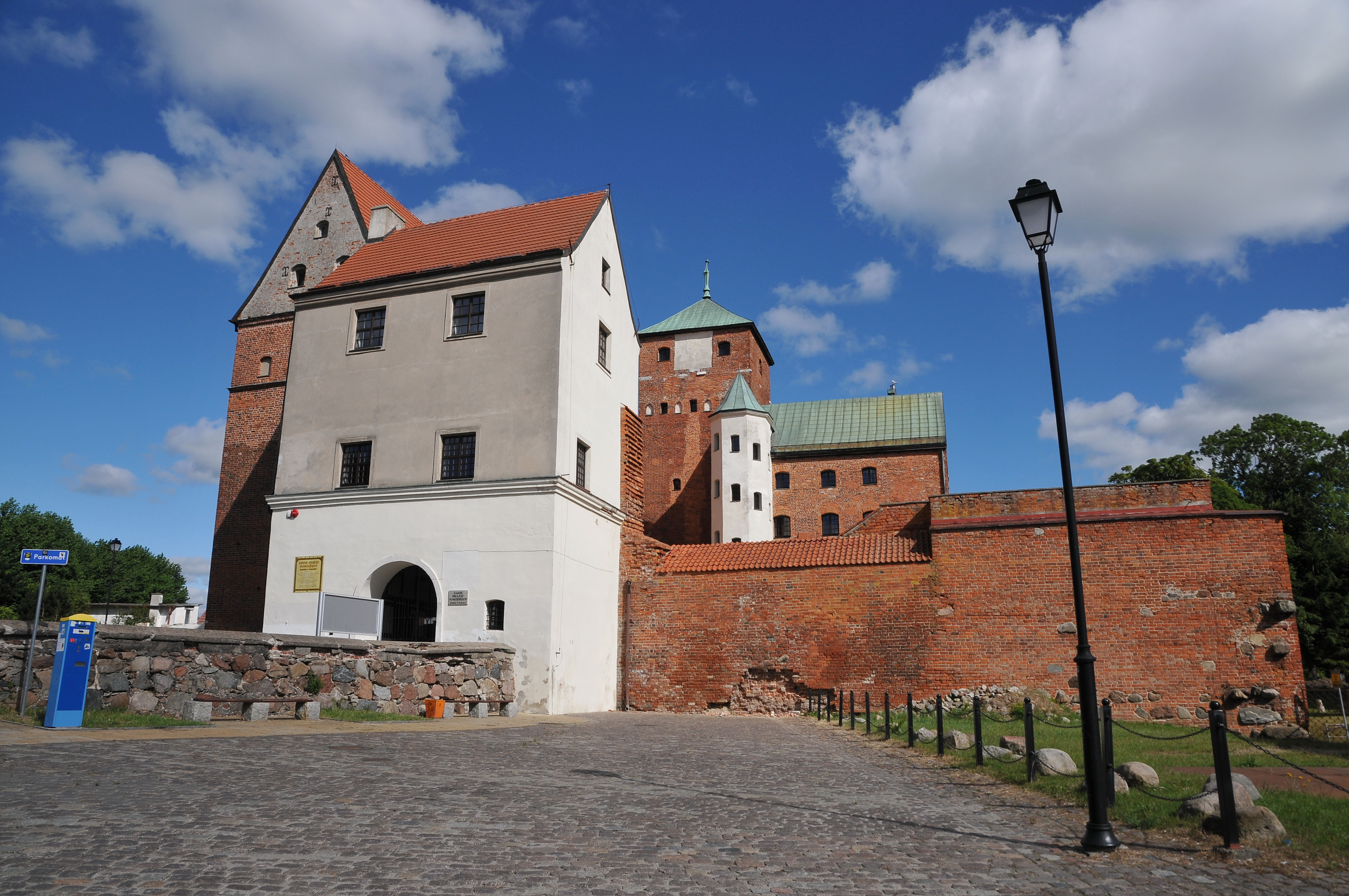
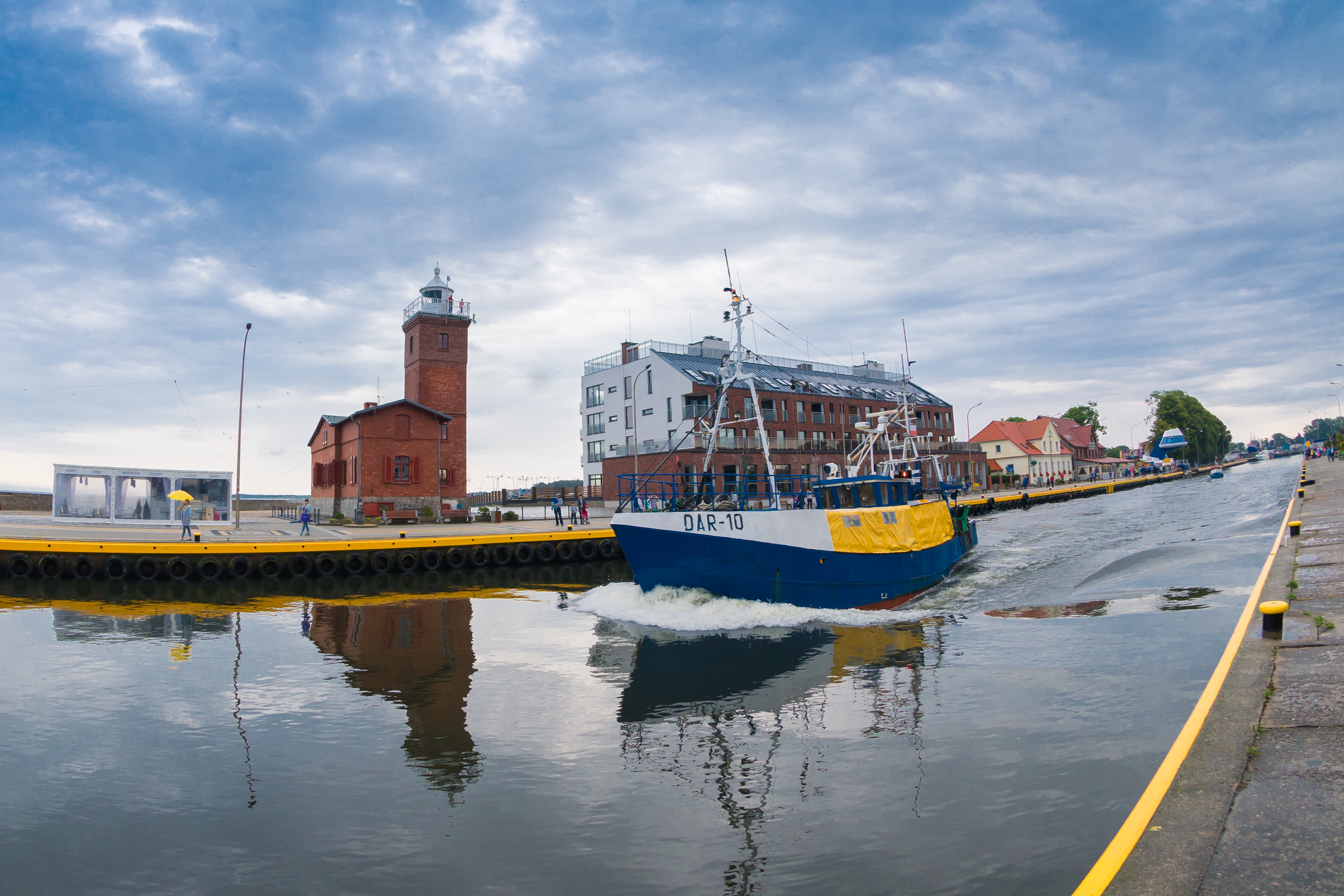
- Market Square with the Town Hall and the nearby Our Lady of Częstochowa Church Darłowo Castle Darłowo Lighthouse

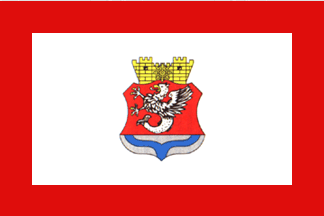
- Flag Coat of arms

- Location within Poland
- Coordinates: 54°25′15″N 16°24′35″E
- Country: Poland
- Voivodeship: West Pomeranian
- County: Sławno
- Gmina: Darłowo (urban gmina)
- Town rights: 1271

Government
  - Mayor: Arkadiusz Wojciech Klimowicz

Area
  - Total: 19.93 km^{2} (7.70 sq mi)
- Highest elevation: 5 m (16 ft)
- Lowest elevation: 1 m (3.3 ft)

Population (31 December 2021)
  - Total: 13,324
  - Density: 668.5/km^{2} (1,732/sq mi)
- Postal code: 76–150 and 76–153
- Area code: +48 94
- Car plates: ZSL
- Website: www.darlowo.pl

Darłowo (Polish: [darˈwɔvɔ]; Kashubian: Dërłowò; German: Rügenwalde) is a seaside town on the Slovincian Coast of north-western Poland, south of the Baltic Sea, with 13,324 inhabitants as of December 2021. Administratively, it is located in Sławno County in West Pomeranian Voivodeship.

The earliest archaeological signs of a settlement in the area occurred when Roman merchants travelled along the Amber Road in the hope of trading precious metals like bronze and silver for amber. By the 11th century the location of the later town was already becoming a significant trading point. Over the years Dukes of Pomerania constructed a Ducal Castle on a nearby island and chose it as their seat. It was here that the largest artillery piece in the world, Schwerer Gustav, was constructed and tested by Nazi Germany during World War II.

The original medieval outline of Darłowo has been preserved to this day. The Old Town, Ducal Castle and local beaches are popular among holidaymakers. Darłowo is also an important historical centre as it is the birthplace and burial site of Eric of Pomerania, King of Denmark, Sweden and Norway.

== History ==
After the last Ice-age had ended at about 8000 BC, settlers of the Stone Age first populated the region. Around 100 AD the region of the later town was inhabited by the East Germanic tribe of the Rugii. According to Ptolemy at the site of the later city was a settlement called Rugium.

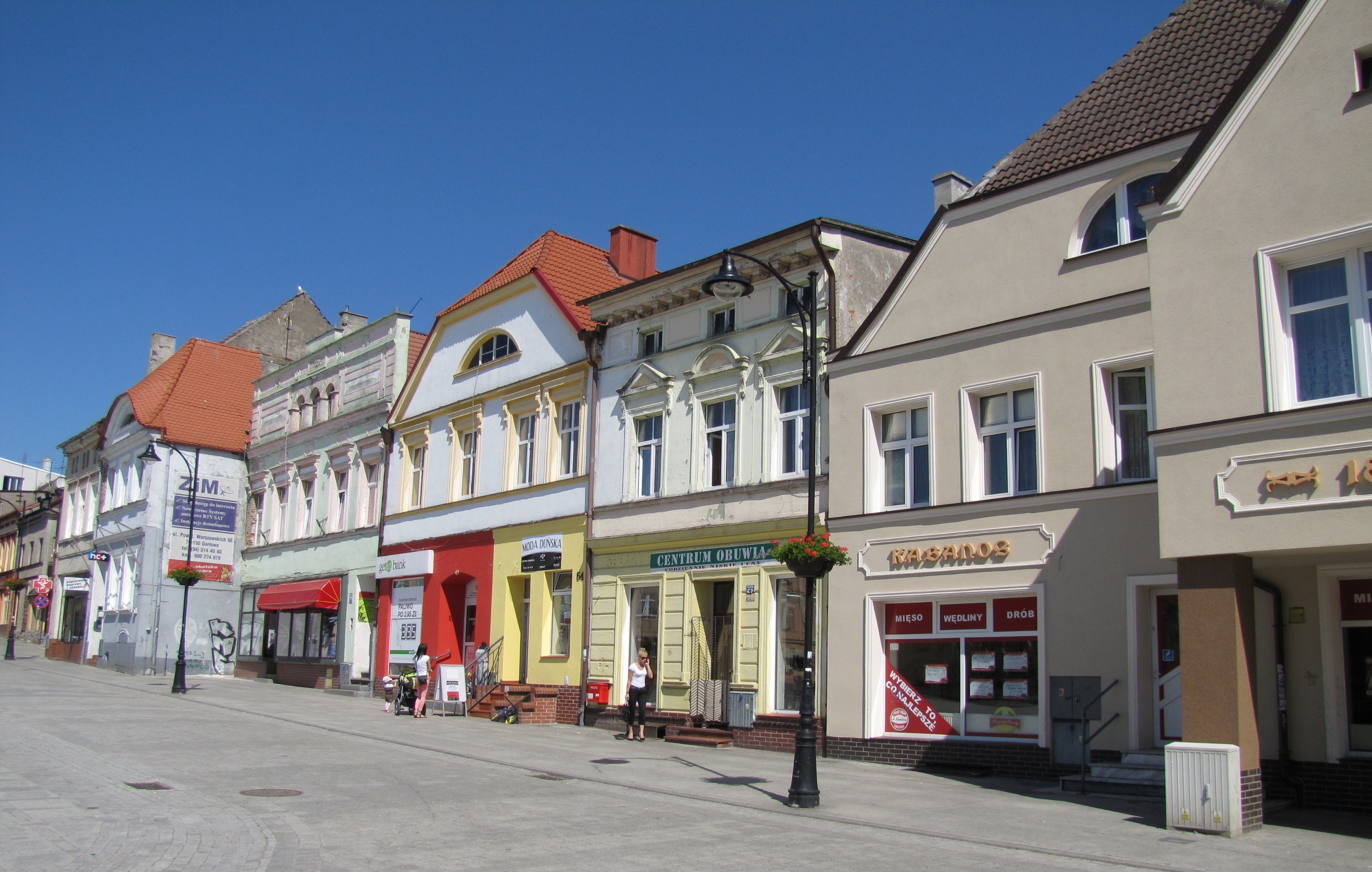
Tenements in the Old Town

=== Middle Ages ===
In the 10th century, the region became part of the emerging country of Poland under its first ruler Mieszko I. By the eleventh century a fortress named Dirlow, (or Dirlovo) existed where the River Wieprza entered the Baltic. From this fortress, the district of Dirlow was administered, which belonged to the castellany of Sławno. A town was later founded in the district of Dirlow, but not at the location of the fortress itself. Following Poland's fragmentation, it was at various times part of the western and eastern duchies of Pomerania.

The town was probably founded in 1270 by Vitslav II of the Danish Principality of Rügen, at that time also ruler of the Lands of Sławno and Słupsk. The first mention of the town is in a document of 5 February 1271. The settlement decayed.

The town was destroyed in 1283 during a conflict between Vitslav II and Mestwin II (Polish: Mszczuj or Mściwój). In a chronicle of 1652, Matthäus Merian stated that the town had been destroyed by Bogislaw of Pomerania, when after Mestwin's II death in December 1294 the Duke Przemysł II (future king) of Poland acquired the town, as a consequence of Treaty of Kępno.

In 1308, the town along with the coastal region of Poland was invaded and occupied by Brandenburg. The town was rebuilt and on 21 May 1312, it was granted Lübeck law under the administration of the noble brothers John, Peter, and Lawrence of the Swienca family, vassals of the Brandenburg margraves since 1308. The Brandenburg margraves undertook in 1308 a campaign against Gdańsk, Poland.

The town passed to the Duchy of Pomerania in 1347, at that time ruled by the brothers Bogislaw V, Wartislaw V, and Barnim IV of the House of Pomerania dynasty. Bogislaw, son-in-law of king Casimir III of Poland, would become ruler of the area after the partition of Pomerania-Wolgast in 1368. This part duchy was known as Pomerania-Stolp (Duchy of Słupsk). Duke Bogislaw VIII, a Polish vassal, tried to direct Polish Baltic trade to the Port of Darłowo, but without success.

=== Transition to modern times ===
In 1352 the construction of the castle began, and co-operation with the Hanseatic League was initiated, with the town becoming a full member of the organization in 1412. The town had its own trade fleet, larger than in other surrounding towns; it actively traded with Lübeck, while boats and ships owned by local merchants travelled as far as Normandy and Spain. In 1382 Eric of Pomerania, later the king of Norway, Denmark and Sweden, was born in the town. After losing his thrones, he returned to his birthplace and began to expand his duchy. After his death in 1459, he was buried in St. Mary's Church. After Eric's death, the town was ruled by Duke Eric II of Pomerania-Wolgast.

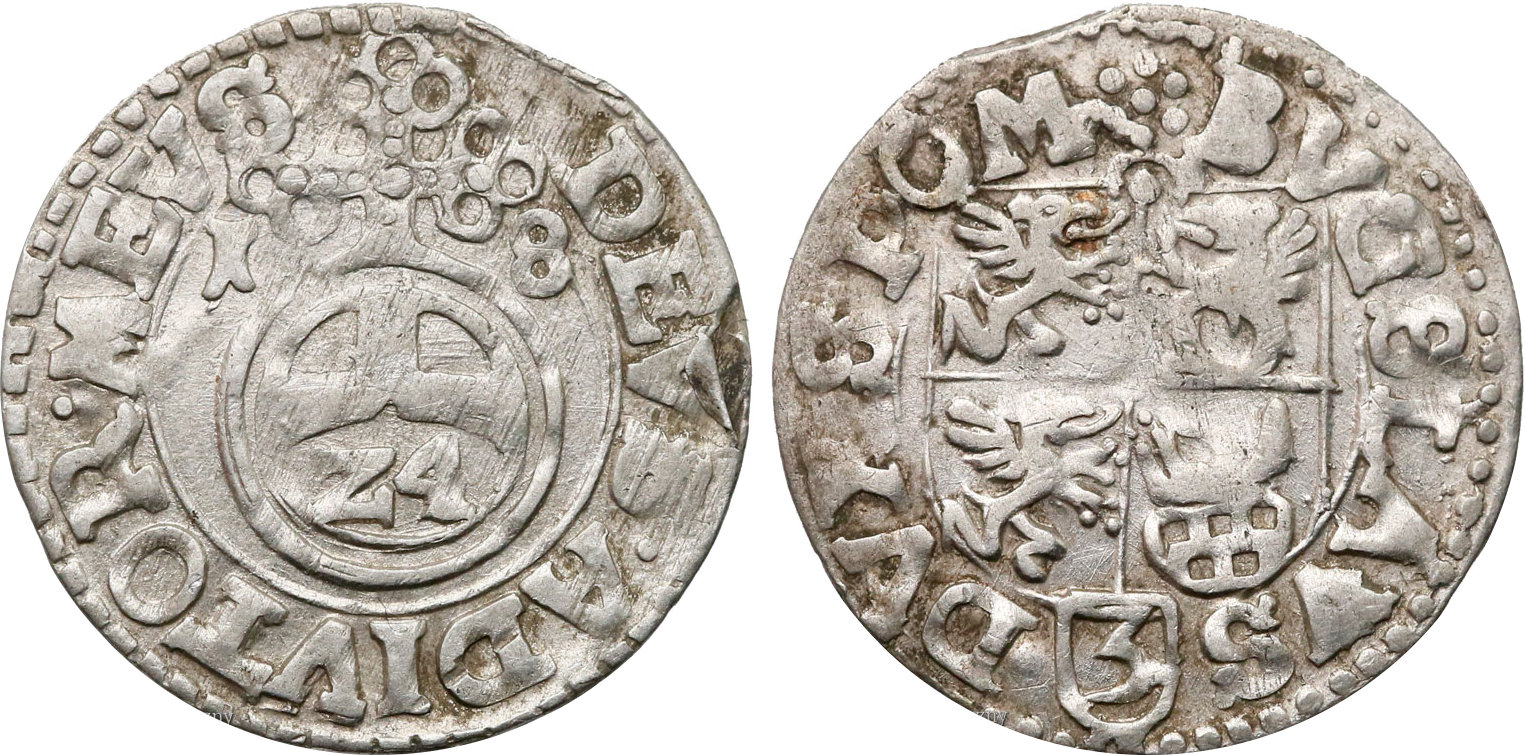
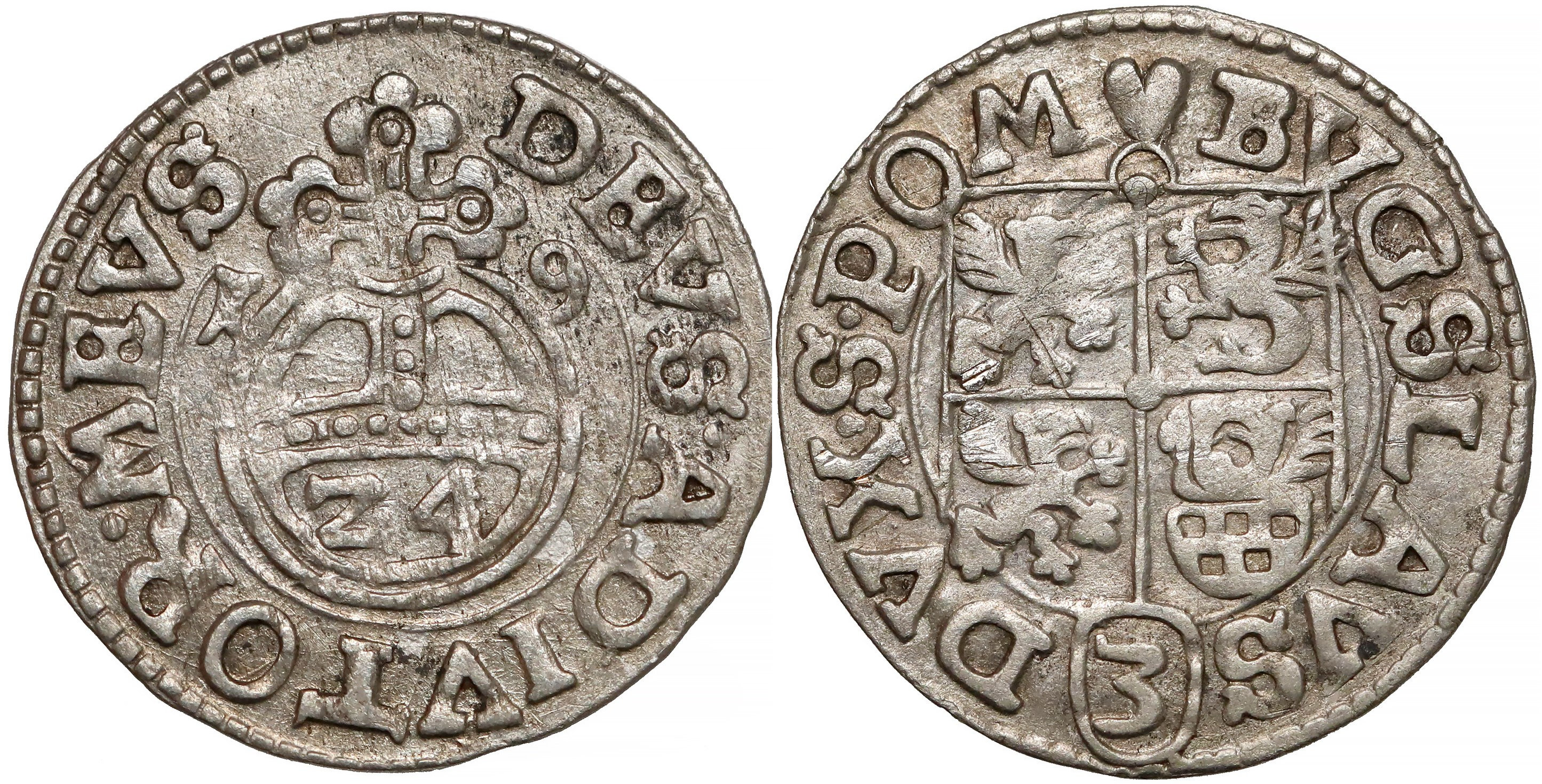
17th-century coins from the local mint

Another significant ruler was Bogislaw X (1454–1523) under whose administration sea trade with the Hanseatic League and land trade with Poland grew increasing the prosperity of the area.

The town suffered a series of natural disasters. In 1497 and 1552 the harbour of the town, known in German as Rügenwaldermünde, and parts of the town were hit by great storms. Ships which broke from their moorings were seen drifting in the vicinity of the town and of the neighbouring village of Suckow. In 1589, 1624, 1648, 1679 and 1722 fires damaged the town.

From 1569 to 1622, it was the capital of a small eponymous duchy, and afterwards it was again part of the Duchy of Pomerania. After the death of the last Pomeranian Duke Bogislaw XIV in 1637, the end of the contemporary Thirty Years' War in 1648 and the subsequent partition of the Duchy of Pomerania between the Swedish Empire and Brandenburg-Prussia in the Peace of Westphalia and the Treaty of Stettin (1653), Brandenburg included Farther Pomerania with Rügenwalde in her Pomeranian province. Following the annexation by Brandenburg the town entered a period of economic stagnation. The harbour of Rügenwaldermünde was destroyed during the Thirty Years' War by imperial troops, and was reconstructed by order of King Frederick II of Prussia not before 1772. The first lighthouse was built around the year 1715.

=== 19th and early 20th centuries ===
During the Napoleonic Wars some of Rügenwalde's inhabitants, in particular ship owners and businessmen, profited from smuggling British goods to the continent. In 1871 the town, along with Prussia, became a part of the German Empire. A railway reached the town in 1878, providing connections with Danzig (Gdańsk) and Stettin (Szczecin). It simultaneously became a popular health resort, mainly due to the exceptional climate. The Royal Swedish Vice Consulate was located in the town in 1859–1901 (Vice Consul Bertold August Riensberg, b. 1823) and in 1914–1936 (Vice Consul Albert Rubensohn, b. 1879).

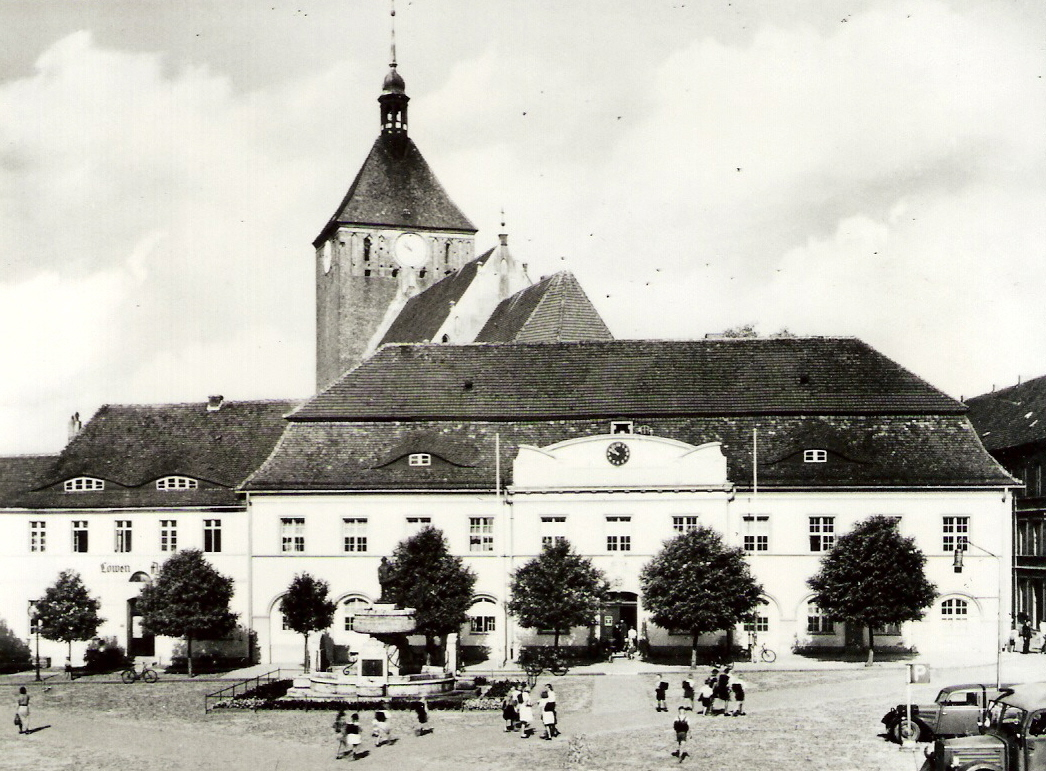
The town hall in 1935

In 1935 the German Army Firing Test Range Rügenwalde-Bad, designed for testing heavy guns, including long-range railway guns such as Krupp K5, was built between Rügenwalde's harbour Rügenwaldermünde and the village of Suckow. Some of the largest guns in military history were tested here: Schwerer Gustav and Mörser Karl. Gun barrels with a length of up to 47 metres (154 feet) were tested. For long-distance tests, target areas within the Baltic Sea North of Großmöllendorf and Henkenhagen (about 80 kilometres (50 miles) away from Rügenwaldermünde) and North of Dievenow and Swinemünde (120 to 130 kilometres (75–81 miles) away) were used. The test site was visited by high-ranking officers of the German Army, Air Force and Navy, including Admiral of the Fleet Erich Raeder and field marshals von Rundstedt, Wilhelm Keitel and Hermann Göring.

During World War II, the German Nazi government operated a forced labour subcamp of the Stalag II-B prisoner-of-war camp for Allied POWs in the town. During World War II the town was used to house families made homeless after the Allied bombing of Hagen and Bochum in the Ruhr district. Shortly before the end of World War II, numerous German refugees from the provinces of East Prussia and Reichsgau Danzig-West Prussia arrived in the region. In early 1945, about 5,600 people escaped by ships of Operation Hannibal before Soviet Troops reached the town on 7 March 1945. About 3,500 citizens remained in the town or returned again after failing to escape.

=== After the end of World War II ===
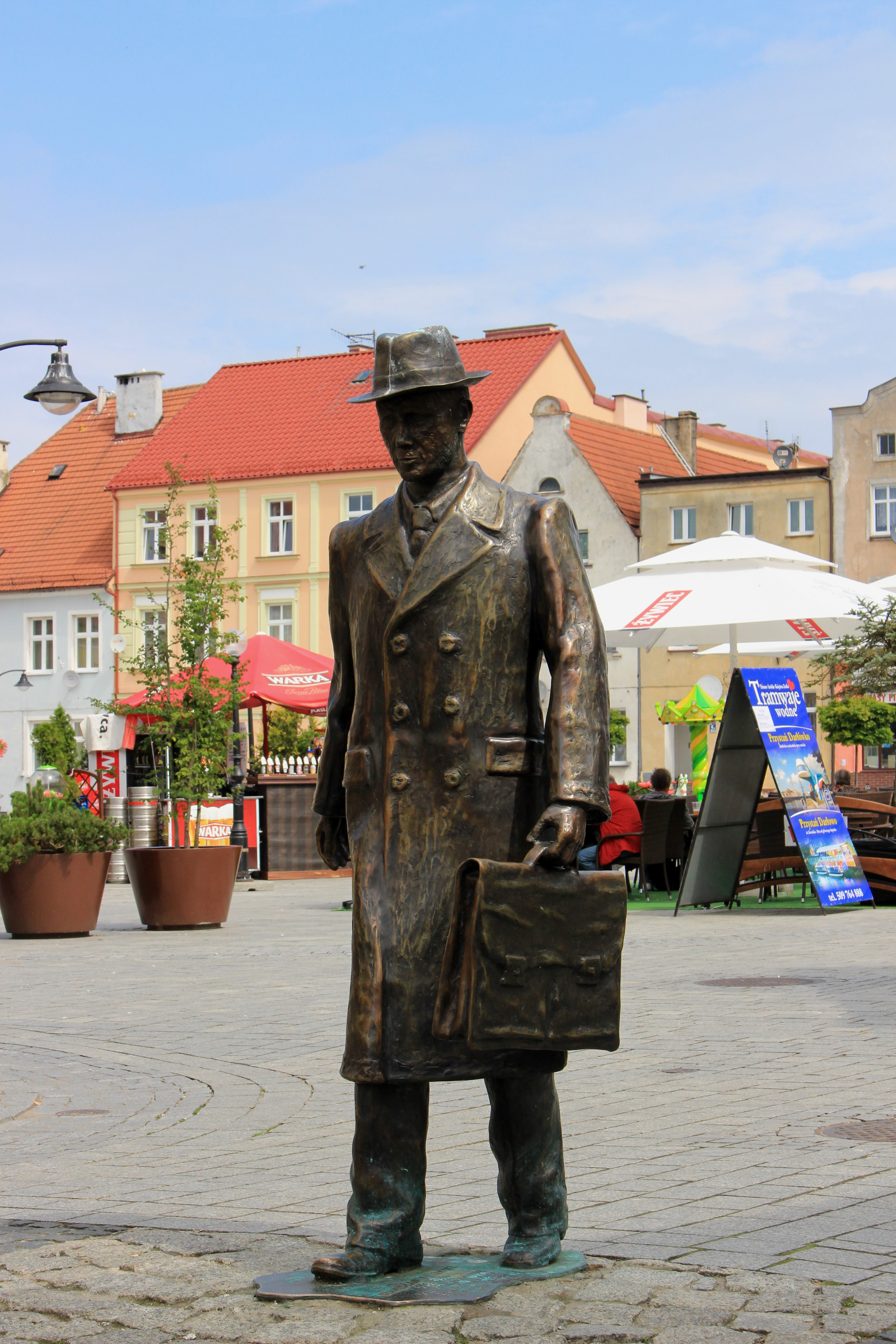
Monument of the first post-war mayor of Darłowo, Stanisław Dulewicz

Following the defeat of Nazi Germany, border changes promulgated at the Potsdam Conference assigned the town once again to Poland, and its German population was expelled. The first expulsion of the surviving German inhabitants took place on 17 October 1945, followed by a series of further expulsions beginning on 17 August 1946. In 1949 only about 70 Germans were left in the town. In 1946–47, the town was repopulated with Poles and Lemkos, who partly came from what had been eastern Poland but was annexed by the Soviet Union. The town was given the Polish name Dyrłów, and later Darłów, before changing to the current name.

The German name Rügenwalde was best known in Germany for the production of the Rügenwalder Teewurst in the town; after World War II the production was restarted in West Germany under the old name.

From 1950 to 1998, it was administratively located in the Koszalin Voivodeship.

Today the Polish Darłowo is a summer resort. A coast aquapark with desalinated seawater is available there, the only one in Poland.

== Main sights ==
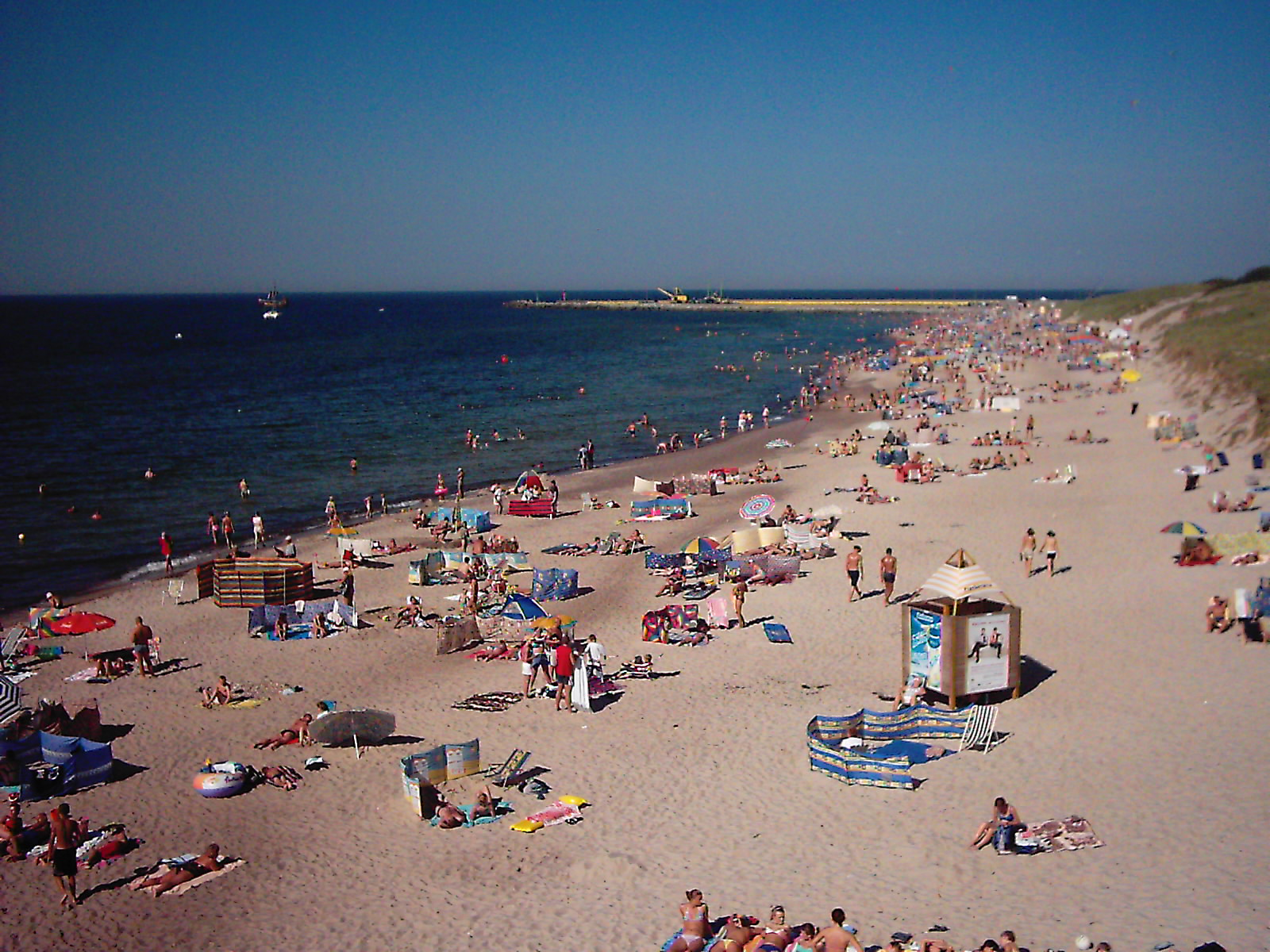
Beach in Darłówko

The entire Old Town area in Darłowo has been entirely preserved. Darłowo has maintained the unique medieval urban planning with the main square in the middle of the town. During medieval times the town was surrounded by walls and had four gates; only one gate, Brama Wysoka (High Gate), has survived in a fairly original shape.

=== Castle of Pomeranian Dukes ===
Although documents directly relating to the construction of the castle in Darłowo have not been found yet, the results of archaeological and architectural and historical premises allow us to date back the creation of the castle to the second half of the fourteenth century. It was during the reign of the prince of the House of Griffins, Boguslaw V and Elizabeth, the daughter of King Casimir the Great. The prince purchased the island with a mill in 1352 from a rich burgher of Darłowo – Elizabeth von Behr – in order to build a fortress on it. Over the decades, a castle had grown on the island, which in its main outlines has survived to this day. The work of Boguslaw V was at that time so representative that so that as early as in 1372 a congress of the Pomeranian princes – brothers and cousins Boguslaw took place within its walls. The first sovereign, who modernised the defence system and extended the castle was Prince Eric the Pomeranian. It took place in the years 1449 to 1459, when after the loss of the throne of Scandinavia, the dethroned king returned to his legacy.

An old king was accompanied by a beautiful and young servant-maid Cecilia, who was the love of his life. Historians still argue about who this mysterious woman really was. Some of them maintain that in the last years of his life, reaching his seventies – she became his wife. One of the contemporary chronicles mention her as "the queen Cecilia".

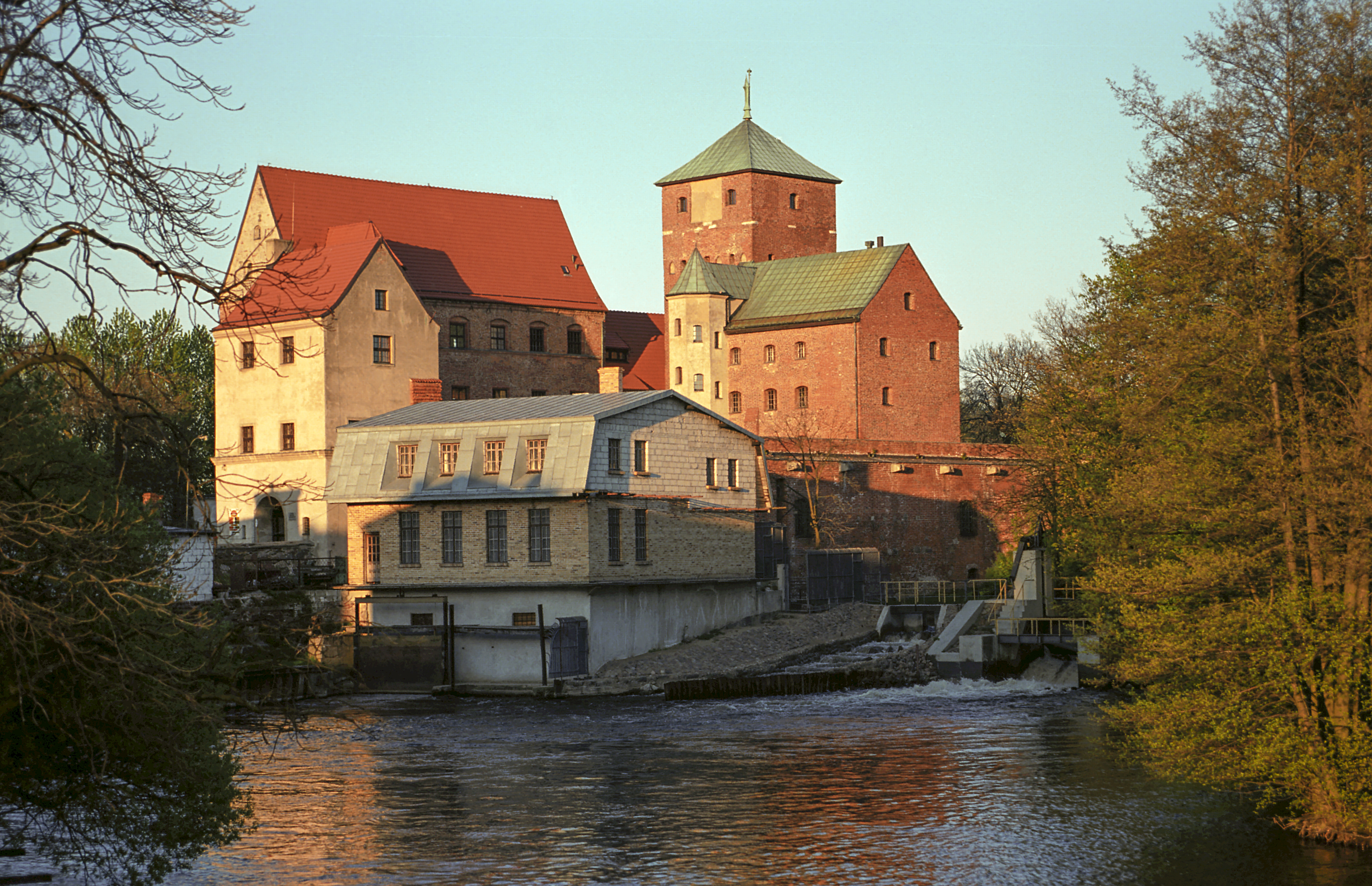
Castle of the Pomeranian Dukes

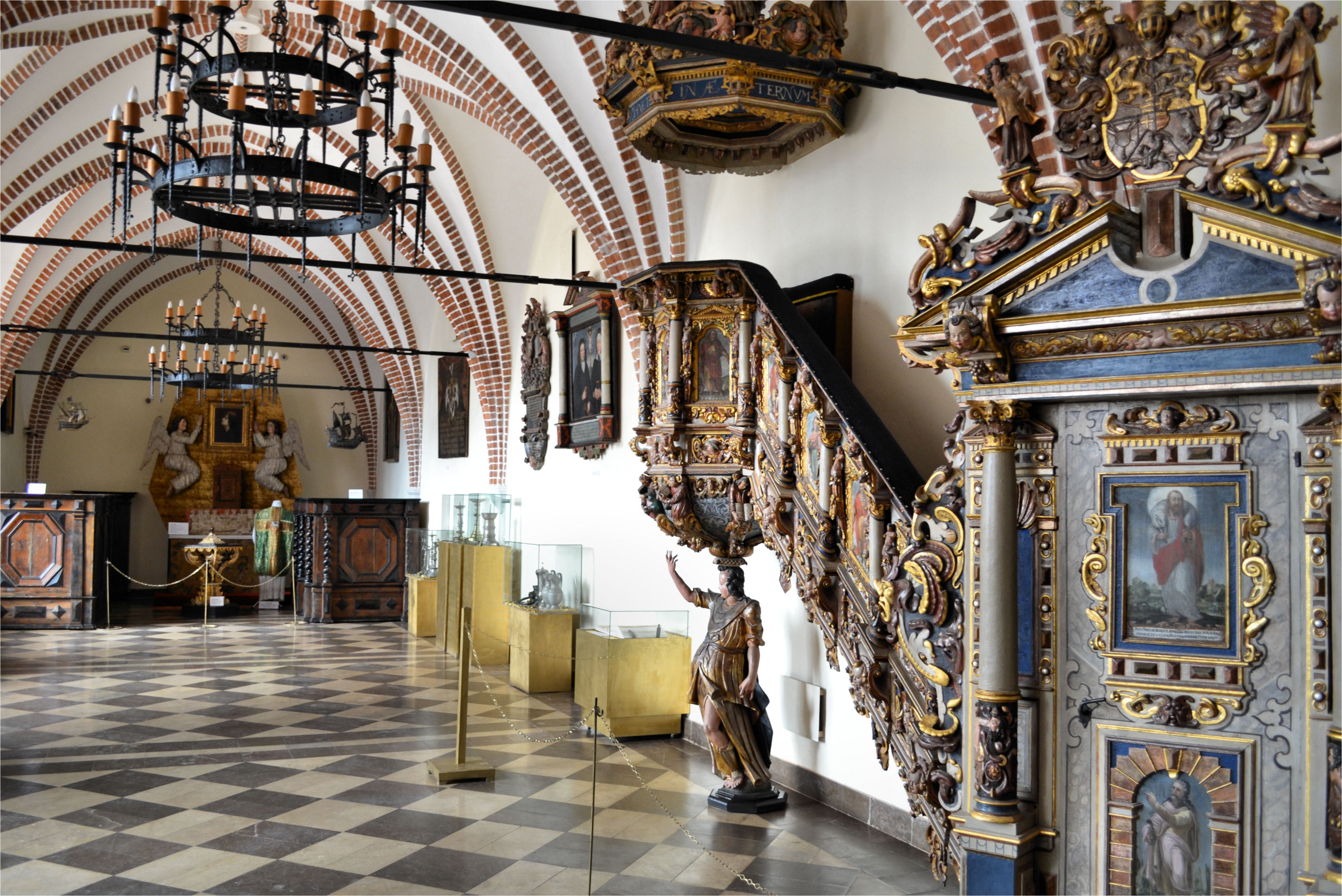
Brick gothic interior of the castle

Shrouded in mystery, the history of the great love of King Eric and Cecilia became an inspiration for artists. The poem "The Return of the Prince Eric" was created by a poet and writer of Koszalin – Czeslaw Zea, and an American journalist and writer Lucie Lehmann – Barclay has been penetrating the archives of Denmark, Sweden, Norway, Germany and the UK for several years in search of traces of Cecilia and Eric. The aim of the writer is to create a love novel of this unique pair based on historical facts. The initial appearance of a medieval fortress of Darłowo was an inspiration to build a similar but larger Kronborg Castle by King Erik in Denmark, where after years, William Shakespeare placed the action of "Hamlet".

The castle of Darłowo is also associated with the figure of Eric Pomerania's granddaughter – Princess Sophia. Legend attributes to her, apparently contrary to the historical facts, cruelty, for which she lingers as the White Lady after her death, circling the castle. The character of Princess Sophia is also related to a romantic love story. The lady of the Darłowo castle was to bestow John of Maszewo with great reciprocating feeling. His Gothic tenement still stands today on the corner of the streets of Powstańców Warszawskich and Morska. Supposedly, the ducal castle was connected with the house of the knight with a secret underground passage, which the knight used at night to sneak into his Lady's... The historical novel based on the life of Princess Sophia, entitled "Beautiful Princess", was written by a writer Zbysław Gorecki living in Darłowo for many years. In the Prussian times, the castle served partly as a warehouse and fell into ruin. Only at the end of the 1930s, a regional museum was created there and it is operating. Its founder and first curator was Karl Rosenow.

Today the castle serves as a Polish Museum. The castle is built in gothic style on a base plan resembling a square; its tower is 24 metres (79 feet) high. This is the only castle of such characteristic on the Polish seacoast.

The peculiarity of Darłowo museum is a two-headed calf, which was probably born in the village Janiewice, district of Sławno in 1919. Another interesting feature of the castle is a cat mummy and a golden sculpture of a dove – a talisman of luck for King Eric and Cecilia. Since the autumn of 2010, a statue of King Eric, showing the "king of exile" has been standing in the courtyard, funded by the Baltic Cooperative Bank in Darłowo.

=== Medieval churches ===
Medieval churches of Darłowo

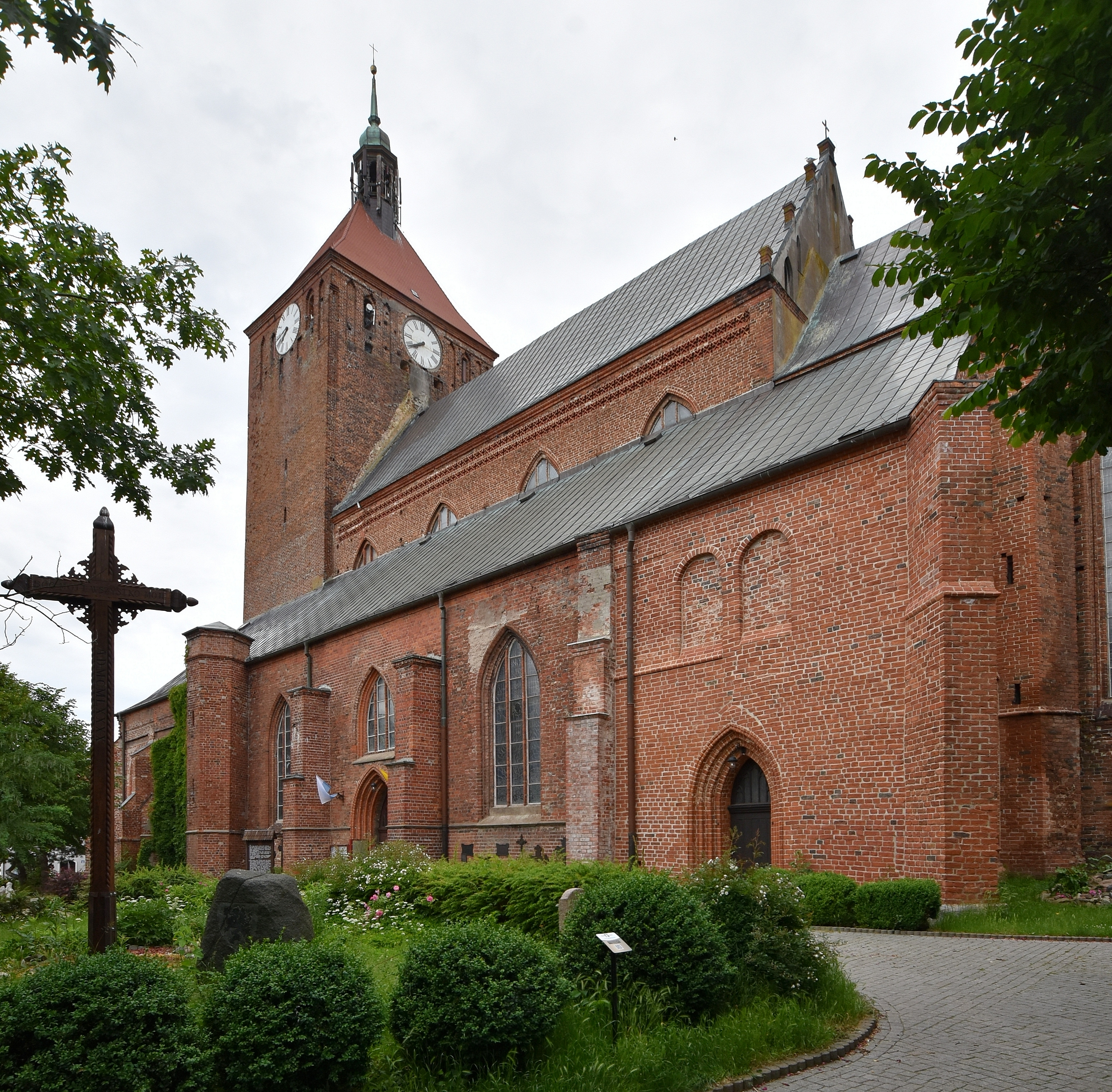
Our Lady of Częstochowa church

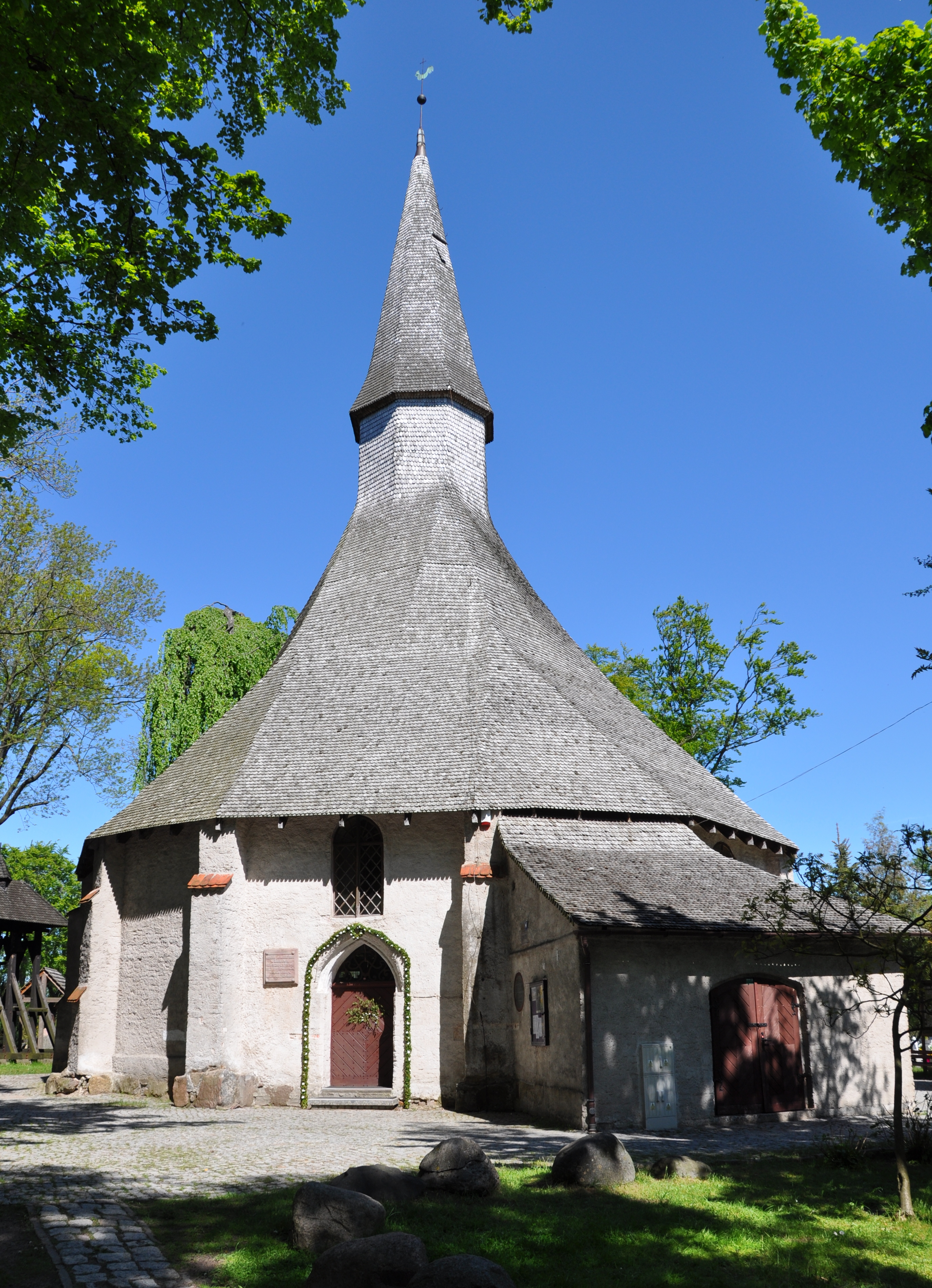
St. Gertrude church

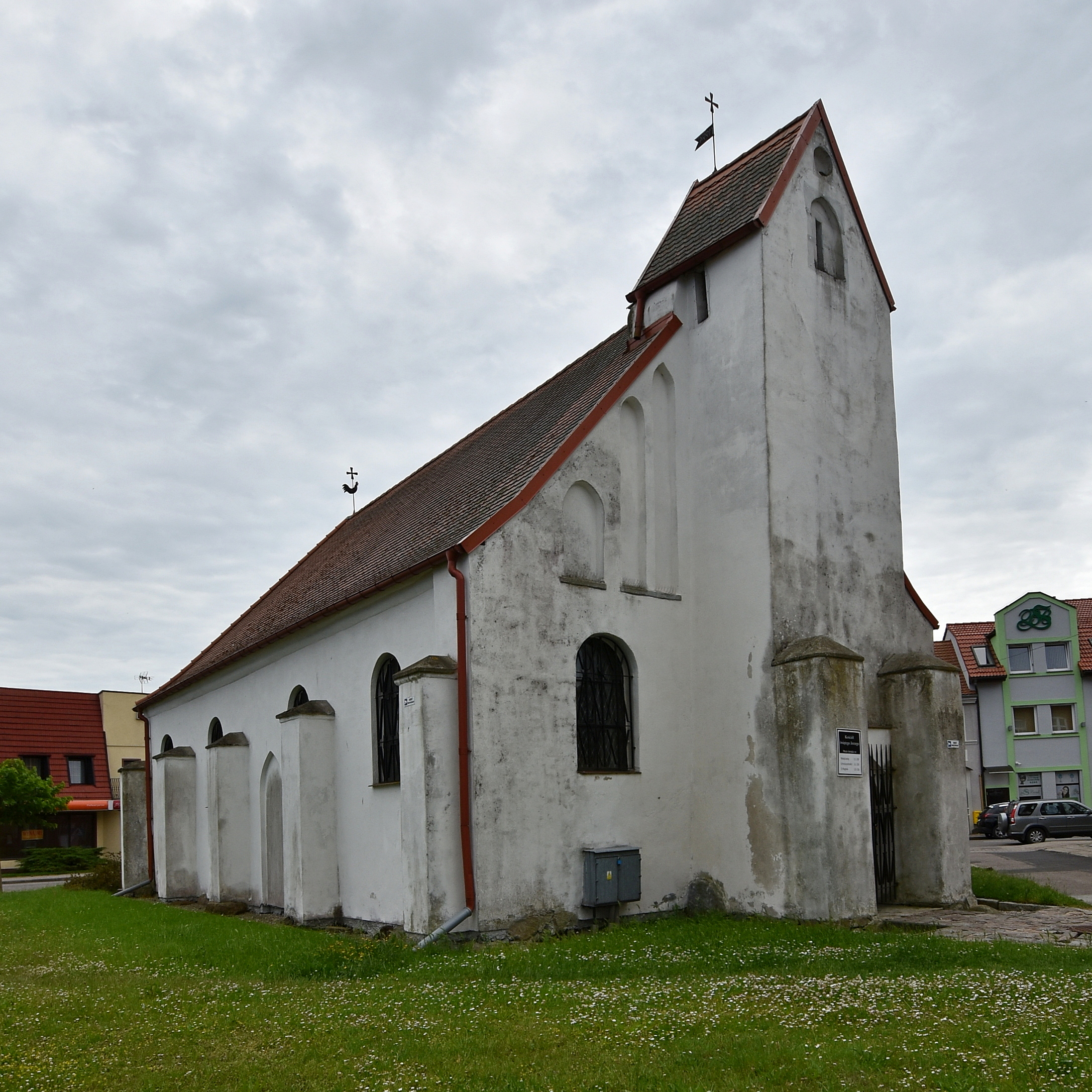
Saint George church

The main landmark church of Darłowo is the Gothic Our Lady of Częstochowa Church from the 14th century, which contains rich Gothic, Renaissance and Baroque interior and furnishings. It is the burial site of Eric of Pomerania, King of Denmark, Norway and Sweden.

The St. Gertrude's Church is a Gothic church dating back to the 15th century. It is Poland's only church built in Scandinavian-style Gothic. In connection with the history of the church, a traditional annual procession takes place in Darłowo in September. The church organs serve both worshipers and Polish and international virtuosos during the annual summer organ festivals organised by the Koszalin Philharmonic.

The smallest of the surviving medieval churches in Darłowo is brick, plastered, one-nave church of St. George from the 15th century. This type of hospital churches were built outside the city walls because of the spread of epidemics such as smallpox and leprosy. Two hospitals belonged to this church: the Holy Spirit, where there were the poor and the sick, and the Holy Jurgen, primarily serving the lepers. In 1680 and beyond, the church was surrounded by 30 clay huts, covered with reeds, where the sick and the senility lived. Around the huts, there were small vegetable gardens. People who lived in the huts, often cleaned Darłowo market, or worked as gravediggers and pallbearer. In the late nineteenth century, red-brick hospital in neo-Gothic style was built next to the church. Today it is a residential building.

=== The Town Hall ===
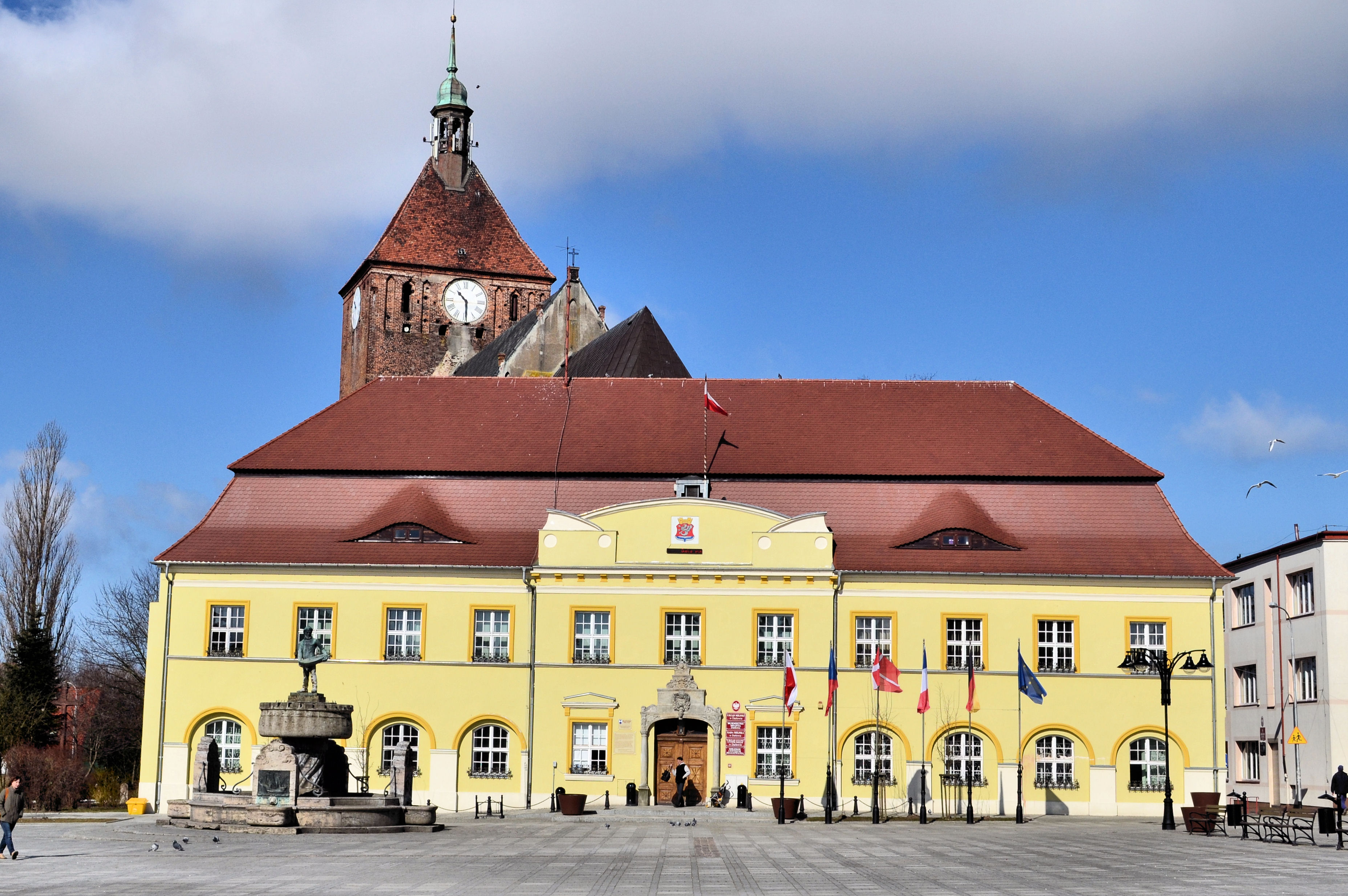
Town Hall

The old City Hall (Ratusz), which stood in the centre of the market, burned down during the great fire in 1722. Then, the municipal government moved to "Cloth Hall" of Darłowo – completely rebuilt halls, located near St. Mary's Church, which since 1725 years has been officially the town hall venue. The interior is non-historical. It is worth to notice the Renaissance portal remaining after the previous town hall, which is located above the door. Coat of arms of the city – a griffin with a tail of a fish – and an inscription in Latin, which in translation reads: "The city was founded in the 12th (the last two digits of the date has not been included because they were then known), the AD, was enlarged in 1312. Three times burned: 1589, 1624, 1648. as many times risen from the ashes. Kind to God and the prince, be always fortunate. Grow and flourish. May God make you happy and may Prince protect you for a long time. But the despair, the fire destroyed it again in 1675 and 1722 and the town hall was rebuilt in 1725 and let it be for the last time".

To this day, the Town Hall is home to the municipal government and the city – untouched – survived the march of the Red Army that won the Western Pomerania in winter of 1945.

=== The Fountain – Fisherman Memorial ===
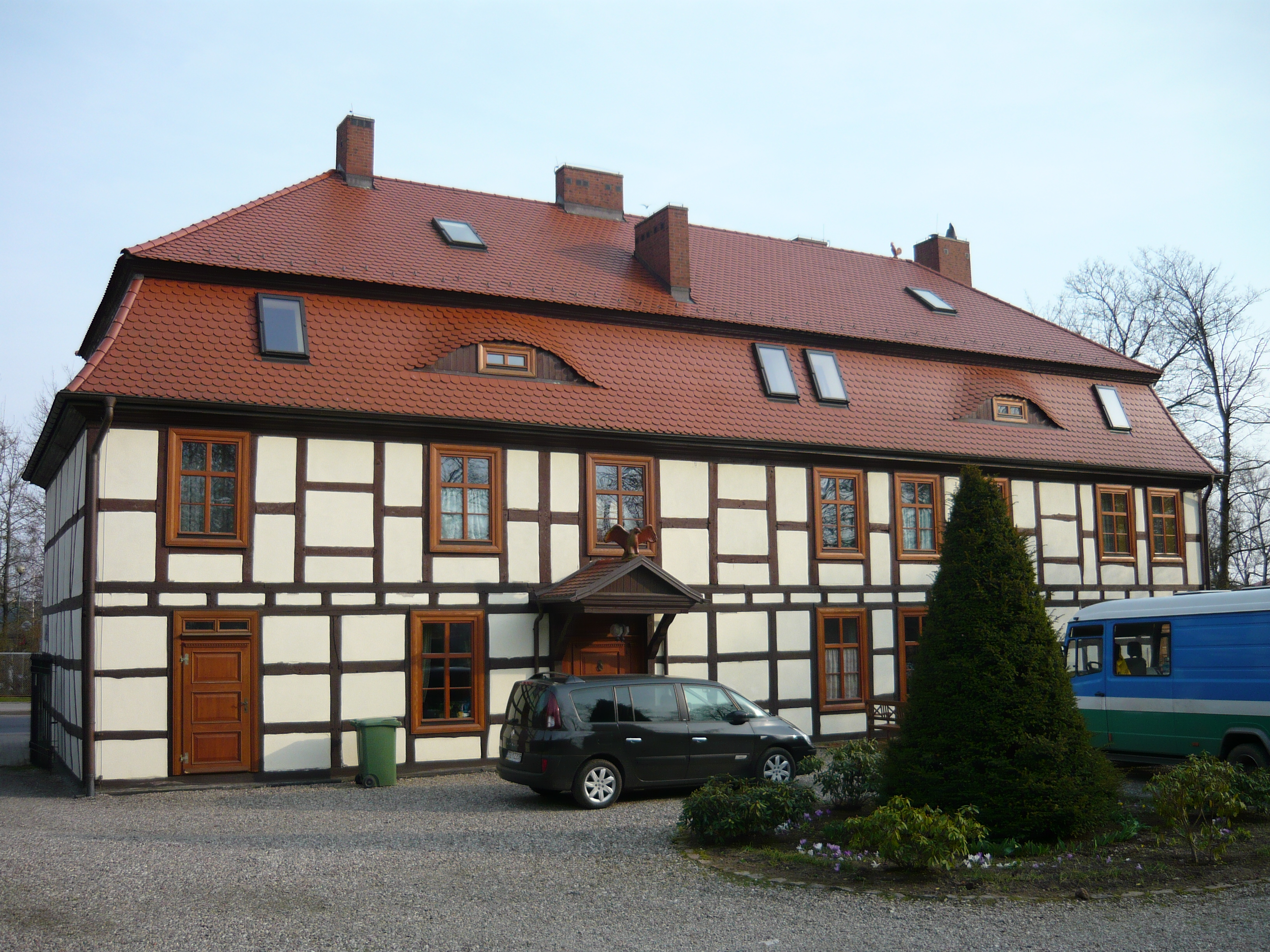
A timber-framed 18th-century inn

It has been located on Darłowo market since 1919. It was made by the sculptor Wilhelm Groß (1883–1974) from Sławno as a monument to honour the people of the sea. The founder of the fountain was the richest Darłowo shipowner – the one from the family of Hemptenmacher, whose house is located at the intersection of ul. Powstańców Warszawskich and ul. Rynkowa. What deserves the attention are four bronze plaques depicting the scenes from the life of the former inhabitants of Darłowo. The board from the side of the Town Hall presents a knight pointing an area where the city was founded. Beside him, there is a scribe and workers digging a ditch, having to circle the fortified castle. From the north, the artist presented the longshoremen working on the loading ship. On the eastern plate, there is koga floating on the waves of the Hanseatic. On the final relief, facing the south, it is shown how a shepherd is guarding a flock of sheep and a woman herding geese. Goose meat, especially liver were the best export product of the former Darłowo.

=== High Gate ===
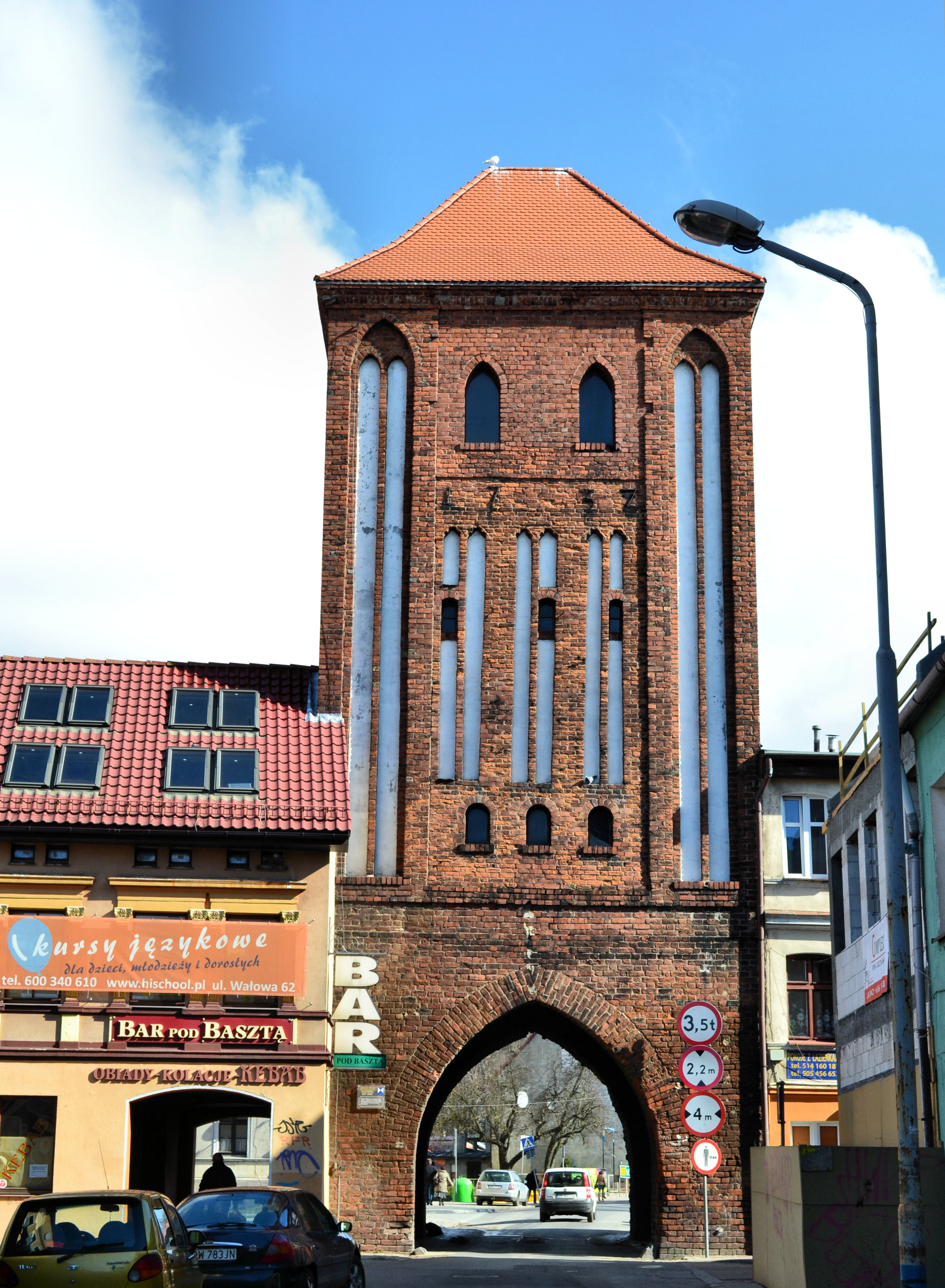
High Gate

The High Gate (Brama Wysoka) is one of the three city gates and the only one that survived until today. The residue of the old city fortifications that surrounded the city with a 1500-meter long wall. It was rebuilt in 1732. It is placed on a square, four-pointed arch crossing, covered with a hipped roof, decorated with pointed-arch blinds. Inside, there are still preserved bullet holes.

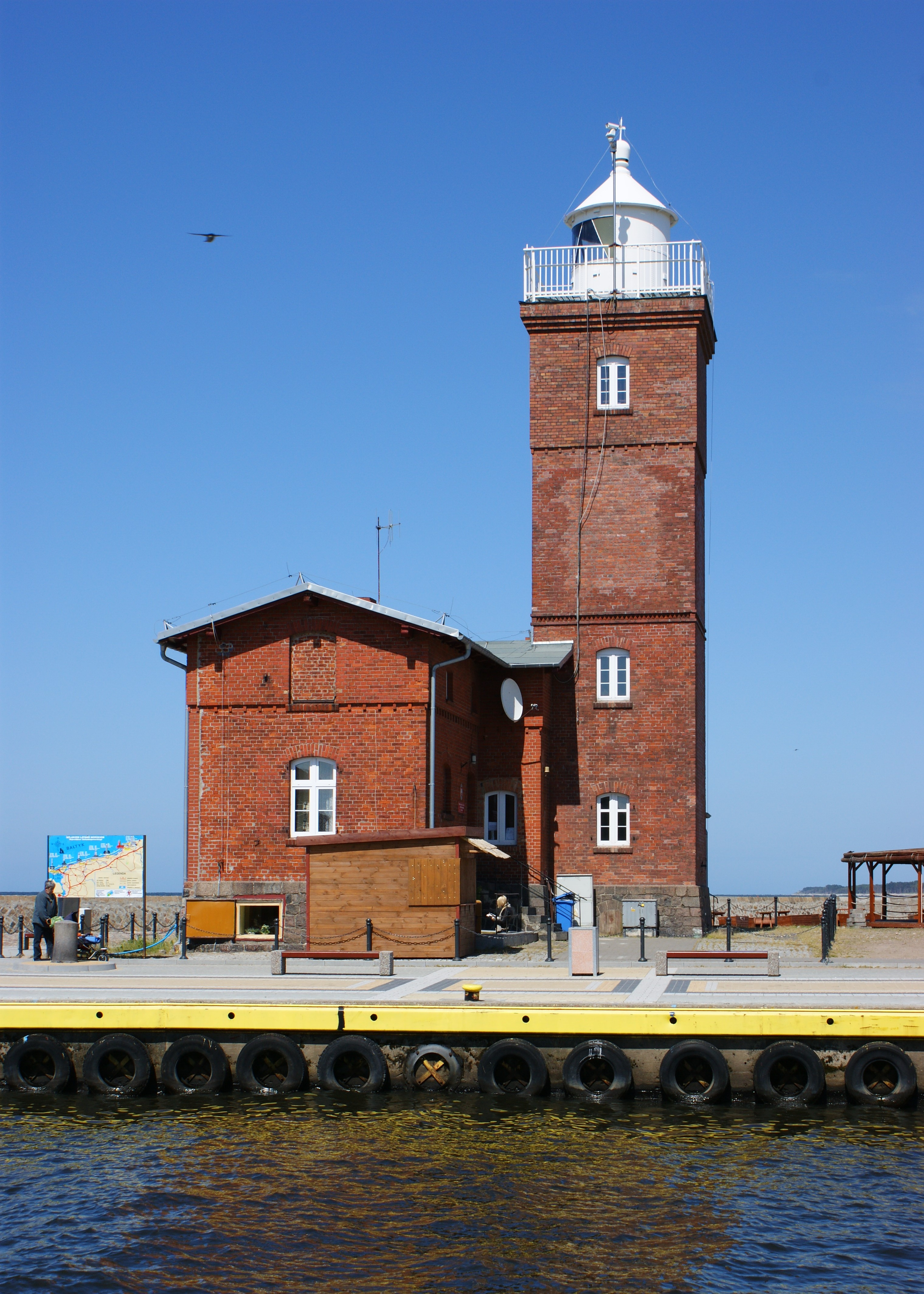
Lighthouse at Darłowo harbour

=== Lighthouse ===
Easternmost lighthouse that belongs to the West Coast is the lighthouse in Darłówko, built at the base of the eastern breakwater at the mouth Wieprza flowing into the Baltic Sea. The first mention of Darłowo lighthouse comes from 1715, when the city authorities ordered to set lights on both sides of the mouth of Wieprza.

It is known that it was only in 1885 when a small pilot ship station was built at the base of the eastern breakwater ground floor. It was a relatively tall red brick building, which adjoins a tower built in the square. At the turn of the nineteenth and twentieth century, the lighthouse underwent several upgrades. The lamp lenses were replaced and the power and colour of the light source were increased. In 1927, the tower was raised by one floor. The building is crowned with a white steel dome, where the light source was moved. Since then, the appearance of the whole building to the present day has undergone only cosmetic changes.

Today, the height of the tower is 22 metres (72 feet), and the range of light pointing the way to the port is nearly 30 kilometres (19 miles). The lighthouse is open for tourists in summer.

The lighthouse of Darłowo is the only lighthouse in Poland built on a rectangular plan.

== Demographics ==
Since the medieval Christianization of the region, the population of the town was Catholic. After the Reformation, the vast majority of the town's population was composed of Protestants. Since the end of World War II the population of Darłowo has been Polish-speaking and either Roman Catholic or non-religious.

Historical population

Year	Pop.	±%
1740	1,973	—
1782	2,255	+14.3%
1791	2,331	+3.4%
1794	2,347	+0.7%
1812	3,163	+34.8%
1817	3,754	+18.7%
1831	3,393	−9.6%
1843	4,534	+33.6%

Year	Pop.	±%
1852	5,060	+11.6%
1861	5,406	+6.8%
1880	5,442	+0.7%
1890	5,296	−2.7%
1900	5,853	+10.5%
1910	5,972	+2.0%
1925	6,037	+1.1%
1933	6,377	+5.6%

Year	Pop.	±%
1939	8,363	+31.1%
1950	5,092	−39.1%
1960	9,225	+81.2%
1978	13,010	+41.0%
1988	15,371	+18.1%
2010	13,954	−9.2%
2021	13,324	−4.5%

== Sports ==
The local football club is Darłovia Darłowo. It competes in the lower leagues.

== Notable people ==
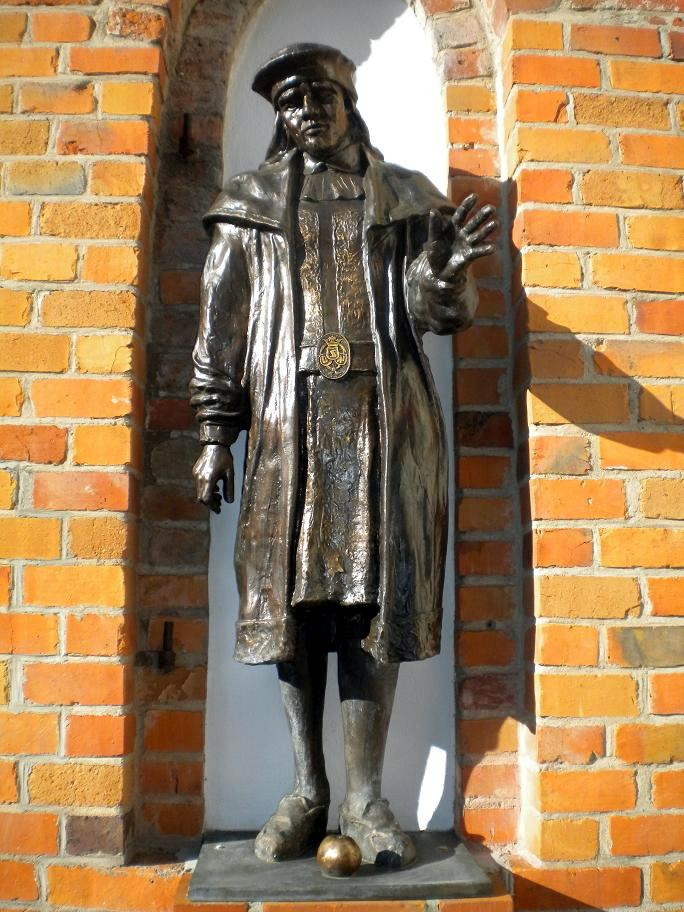
Statue of King Eric the Pomeranian at Darłowo Castle

- Eric of Pomerania KG (1381 or 1382–1459), the ruler of the Kalmar Union from 1396 until 1439
- Bogislaw X, Duke of Pomerania (1454–1523), Duke of Pomerania from 1474 to 1523
- August Koberstein (1797–1870), German literary historian.
- Stanisław Flejterski (born 1948), Polish economist and professor of economic sciences

== International relations ==
=== Twin towns – sister cities ===
Darłowo is twinned with:

Gardelegen, Germany; Hässleholm, Sweden; Nexø, Denmark	Starý Hrozenkov, Czech Republic; Saint-Doulchard, France; Zingst, Germany

== See also ==
- Port of Darłowo
- Darłówko

== Literature ==
- (in German) Helge Bei der Wieden and Roderich Schmidt, eds.: Handbuch der historischen Stätten Deutschlands: Mecklenburg/Pommern, Kröner, Stuttgart 1996, ISBN 978-3-520-31501-4, pp. 262–264.
- (in German) Gustav Kratz: Die Städte der Provinz Pommern – Abriß ihrer Geschichte, zumeist nach Urkunden, Berlin 1865, pp. 327–338 (online).
- (in German) Manfred Vollack (ed.): Der Kreis Schlawe – Ein pommersches Heimatbuch, Husum: Husum Druck und Verlagsgesellschaft, 1986/1989, Vol. I: Der Kreis als Ganzes, ISBN 3-88042-239-7, Vol. II: Die Städte und Landgemeinden, ISBN 3-88042-337-7 (The book contains several articles concerning the town of Rügenwalde, which had been written prior to World War II. Included is also a more recent article by Ellinor von Puttkamer on the Swienca family.)
