= Wrześnica, Sławno County =

Wrześnica
- Village
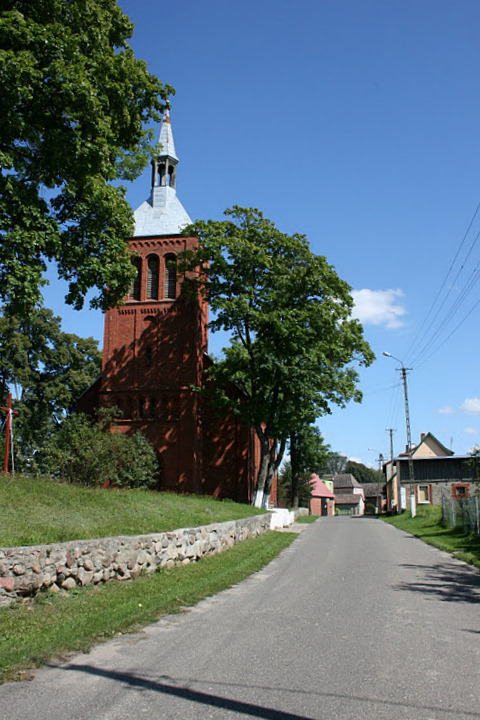
- Our Lady of Consolation church in Wrześnica

- Location within Poland
- Coordinates: 54°24′4″N 16°46′57″E
- Country: Poland
- Voivodeship: West Pomeranian
- County: Sławno
- Gmina: Gmina Sławno

Population
  - Total: 784
- Time zone: UTC+1 (CET)
  - Summer (DST): UTC+2 (CEST)

Wrześnica [vʐɛɕˈnit͡sa] (formerly German Freetz) is a village in Gmina Sławno, within Sławno County, West Pomeranian Voivodeship, in north-western Poland. It lies approximately 8 km (5 mi) north-east of Sławno and 181 km (112 mi) north-east of the regional capital Szczecin. In 2021, Wrześnica had 784 inhabitants.

== Etymology ==
The name of the village is of Slavic origin, and comes from the word wrzos, which means "heather".

== Transport ==
The S6 expressway passes directly to the south of Wrześnica.

Wrześnica has a station on the Gdańsk-Szczecin railway line.

== History ==
The territory became part of the emerging Polish state under its first ruler Mieszko I by c. 967. Following the fragmentation of Poland, it was at various times part of the duchies of Western Pomerania, Eastern Pomerania and Słupsk. From 1701, the village was part of the Kingdom of Prussia, and from 1871 to 1945 of unified Germany.

Little is known about the history of the extended cluster village – the centre near the church was called Dreieck before 1945 (due to its triangular shape). In Freetzer Heide there is an overgrown hill surrounded by a ditch, which was called the castle before 1945 and indicates an early castle complex.

The village has belonged to the Rügenwalde administrative area since old times. In 1652, the towns of Darłowo (Rügenwalde), Sławno (Schlawe) and Słupsk (Stolp) held a convention here to protest against the Swedish tax levy in the disputes between Brandenburg and Sweden.

Around 1780, Freetz was a village with 19 farmers, 1 free schoolmaster, 4 landowners (including 1 miller and 1 blacksmith), 3 Büdner, 1 schoolhouse and 1 shepherd's croft with a total of 32 fireplaces (households). In 1818, 289 inhabitants lived here, whose number rose to 1023 by 1885 and was still 900 in 1939.

Until 1945 Freetz belonged to the registry office district of Noskowo (Notzkow) and to the District court area of Sławno (Schlawe). The village was in the district of Sławno ("Schlawe i. Pom.") in the administrative district of Koszalin (Köslin) in the Prussian province of Pomerania.

In March 1945, Red Army troops occupied the village. There were arbitrary shootings and the deportation of numerous inhabitants. Freetz was then placed under Polish administration and renamed Wrześnica. The inhabitants were expelled in accordance with the Potsdam Agreement. The last German inhabitants left the village in 1947.

The village has several shops, a post office, a library, a dentist and a cemetery. The marked Sławno cycle path runs through the village.

== Religion ==
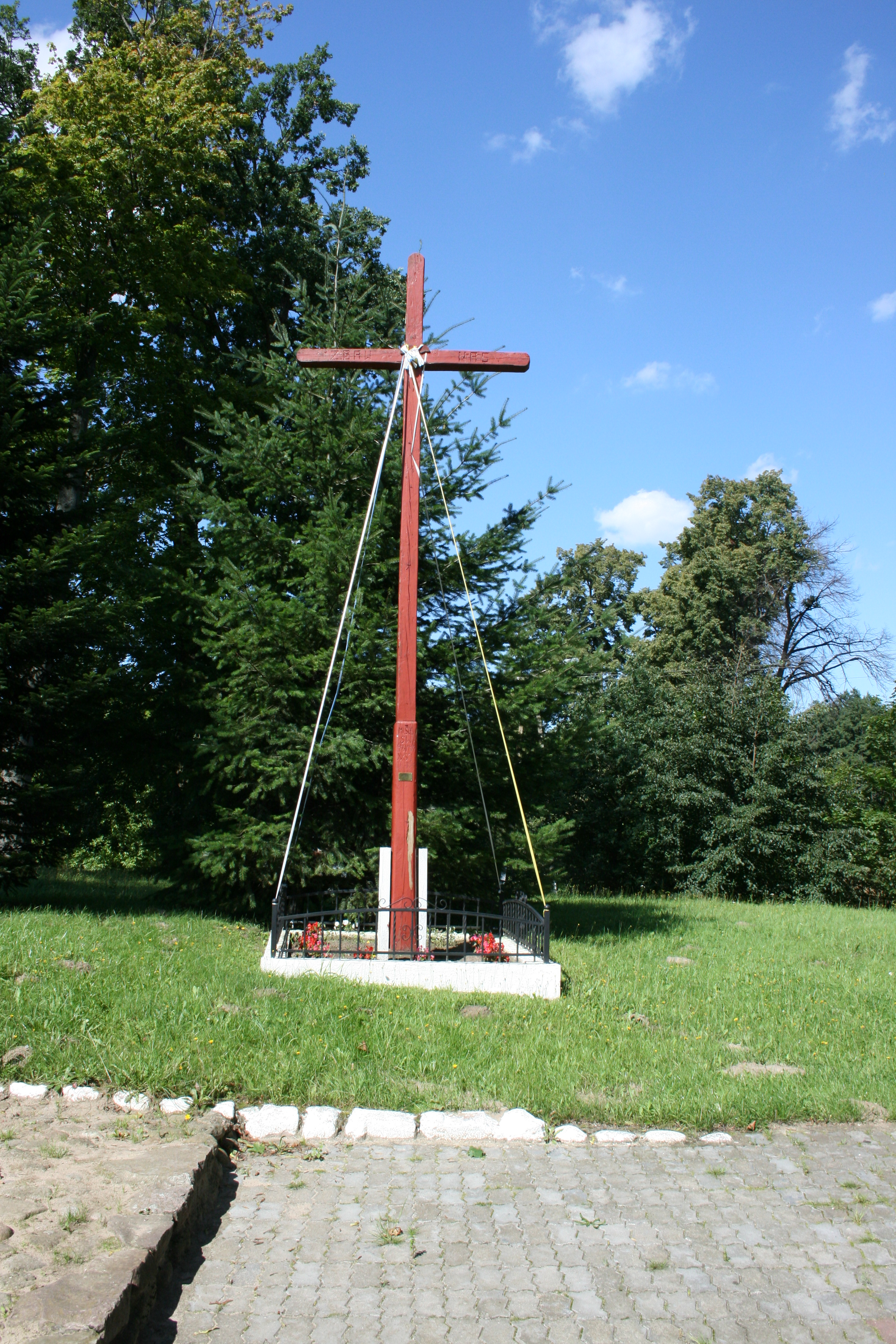
Wayside cross

=== Parish ===
The population of Wrześnica was predominantly Protestant before 1945. The village formed an independent parish which, together with the parishes of Sławsko (Alt Schlawe)) and Staniewice (Stemnitz), belonged to the parish of Sławsko (Alt Schlawe). It was integrated into the parish of Darłowo (Rügenwalde) until 1928, then into the parish of Sławno (Schlawe) of the Pomeranian ecclesiastical province of the Church of the Old Prussian Union. In 1940, 970 of the 2904 parishioners belonged to the parish of Wrześnica (Freetz). The last German clergyman was Pastor Paul Hollatz.

Since 1945, Roman Catholic church members have lived in Wrześnica almost without exception. The village is now a branch parish of the parish of Warszkowo - newly established in 1998 - in the deanery of Sławno in the Roman Catholic Diocese of Koszalin-Kołobrzeg of the Catholic Church in Poland. Protestant believers living here are assigned to the Evangelical Church of the Augsburg Confession in Poland with the parish offices in Koszalin and Słupsk in the Lutheran Diocese of Pomerania-Greater Poland.

=== Village church ===
The red brick church with belfry and tower is a neo-Gothic building from the 19th century and was built on the foundation walls of the predecessor church. It was consecrated on 9 December 1868. Several liturgical objects (brass baptismal bowl, altar chandelier) and wooden figures (Mary, Paul, etc.) were still present from the previous church. Before 1945, there was a ceiling painting above the altar: in a sky decorated with stars, an angel in light blue robes and waving a peace sash with the saying: Ehre sei Gott in den Höhen und Friede auf Erden unter den Menschen, an denen Gott ein Wohlgefallen hat. (Glory to God in the highest, and on earth peace among men with whom He is pleased.) The altar was decorated with stars.

Until 1945, the place of worship served exclusively Protestant services. In 1945 it was expropriated in favour of the Catholic Church, which rededicated it in the same year under the name Matki Bożej Pocieszenia (Mother of God of Consolation). Currently, the Catholic church belongs to the parish in Warszkowo.

== Schools ==
The village's primary school was built around the turn of the 19th and 20th centuries. It had three classrooms and two teachers' flats until 1945. A school had existed in Wrześnica since at least 1784.

In September 1945, a Polish primary school was founded in Wrześnica, initially teaching 11 pupils, children of the new settlers. After a secondary school had been established in the meantime following an educational reform, there is now an eight-class primary school, which is also attended by the children of the neighbouring villages of Noskowo and Żabno.

== Sources ==
- Der Kreis Schlawe. Ein pommersches Heimatbuch, hrsg. von Manfred Vollack, 2 Bände, Husum, 1988/1989. (German)
