= Borkowo, Sławno County =

Borkowo
- Village
- Location within Poland
- Coordinates: 54°13′50″N 16°35′19″E
- Country: Poland
- Voivodeship: West Pomeranian
- County: Sławno
- Gmina: Malechowo
- Population: 160

Borkowo [bɔrˈkɔvɔ] (formerly German Borkow) is a village in the administrative district of Gmina Malechowo, within Sławno County, West Pomeranian Voivodeship, in north-western Poland. It lies approximately 10 km (6 mi) south-east of Malechowo, 17 km (11 mi) south of Sławno, and 160 km (99 mi) north-east of the regional capital Szczecin.

It is noted for the Borkowo megalithic cemetery – a Bronze Age burial ground.

For the history of the region, see History of Pomerania.

The village has a population of 160.
