= Paprocki =

Paprocki (feminine: Paprocka; plural: Paproccy) is a Polish locational surname, which originally meant a person from one of the places called Paproć, Paprotki, Paprotno or Paproty in Poland. paproć is Polish for fern, so Paprocki may also be a topographic name for a resident of a location where many ferns grew. Related surnames include Paprocký (Czech), Paprotski, and Paprotsky.

Notable people with the surname include:

- Bartosz Paprocki (1543–1614), Polish writer
- Katarzyna Paprocka (died 1638), Polish woman accused of sorcery
- Thomas Paprocki (born 1952), American bishop
- Wacław Paprocki (died 1643), Polish bishop
