= Święcianowo =

- Village
- Location within Poland
- Coordinates: 54°16′14″N 16°35′40″E
- Country: Poland
- Voivodeship: West Pomeranian
- County: Sławno
- Gmina: Malechowo
- Elevation: 18 m (59 ft)
- Population: 210

Święcianowo (Polish pronunciation: [ɕfjɛɲt͡ɕaˈnɔvɔ]) (German: Wiesenthal) is a village in the administrative district of Gmina Malechowo, within Sławno County, West Pomeranian Voivodeship, in north-western Poland. It lies approximately 7 km (4 mi) south-east of Malechowo, 13 km (8 mi) south-west of Sławno, and 163 km (101 mi) north-east of the regional capital Szczecin.

The village has a population of 210.

== History ==
For the history of the region, see History of Pomerania.

The modern settlement of was founded in the final quarter of the eighteenth century from Segenthin (since 1945 known by its polish name as Żegocino). Segenthin was at that time held by Carl Caspar von Kleist (1734–1808) who received a royal grant for the development of arable land, which he used to establish two farms and eight smallholdings. After 1834 the place came under the control (Gutsherrschaft) of Wilhelm Heinrich Ernst Gustav von Blumenthal, and a period of economic revival followed as the rural economy recovered after the agricultural depression of the 1820s.
