= Grabowo, Sławno County =

Grabowo
- Village
- Location within Poland
- Coordinates: 54°17′33″N 16°26′0″E
- Country: Poland
- Voivodeship: West Pomeranian
- County: Sławno
- Gmina: Malechowo
- Population: 120

Grabowo [ɡraˈbɔvɔ] (formerly German: Martinshagen, or Alt Martinshagen) is a village in the administrative district of Gmina Malechowo, within Sławno County, West Pomeranian Voivodeship, in north-western Poland. It lies approximately 6 km (4 mi) west of Malechowo, 19 km (12 mi) south-west of Sławno, and 156 km (97 mi) north-east of the regional capital Szczecin.

For the history of the region, see History of Pomerania.

The village has a population of 120.
