= Białęcino =

- Village
- Location within Poland
- Coordinates: 54°15′20″N 16°39′9″E
- Country: Poland
- Voivodeship: West Pomeranian
- County: Sławno
- Gmina: Malechowo

Białęcino [bjawɛnˈt͡ɕinɔ] (German Balenthin) is a village in the administrative district of Gmina Malechowo, within Sławno County, West Pomeranian Voivodeship, in north-western Poland. It lies approximately 11 km (7 mi) south-east of Malechowo, 13 km (8 mi) south of Sławno, and 165 km (103 mi) north-east of the regional capital Szczecin.

For the history of the region, see History of Pomerania.
