= Gorzyca, West Pomeranian Voivodeship =

Gorzyca
- Village
- Location within Poland
- Coordinates: 54°18′19″N 16°28′45″E
- Country: Poland
- Voivodeship: West Pomeranian
- County: Sławno
- Gmina: Malechowo
- Population: 230

Gorzyca [ɡɔˈʐɨt͡sa] (German: Göritz) is a village in the administrative district of Gmina Malechowo, within Sławno County, West Pomeranian Voivodeship, in north-western Poland. It lies approximately 3 km (2 mi) west of Malechowo, 15 km (9 mi) south-west of Sławno, and 159 km (99 mi) north-east of the regional capital Szczecin.

For the history of the region, see History of Pomerania.
