= Ostrowiec, Sławno County =

Ostrowiec
- Village
- Location within Poland
- Coordinates: 54°16′34″N 16°40′13″E
- Country: Poland
- Voivodeship: West Pomeranian
- County: Sławno
- Gmina: Malechowo
- Population: 860

Ostrowiec [ɔsˈtrɔvjɛt͡s] (German Wusterwitz) is a village in the administrative district of Gmina Malechowo, within Sławno County, West Pomeranian Voivodeship, in north-western Poland. It lies approximately 11 km (7 mi) east of Malechowo, 11 km (7 mi) south of Sławno, and 167 km (104 mi) north-east of the regional capital Szczecin.

For the history of the region, see History of Pomerania.
