= Malechówko =

- Village
- Location within Poland
- Coordinates: 54°18′45″N 16°32′44″E
- Country: Poland
- Voivodeship: West Pomeranian
- County: Sławno
- Gmina: Malechowo
- Population: 180

Malechówko [malɛˈxufkɔ] is a village in the administrative district of Gmina Malechowo, within Sławno County, West Pomeranian Voivodeship, in north-western Poland. It lies approximately 3 km (2 mi) east of Malechowo, 11 km (7 mi) south-west of Sławno, and 163 km (101 mi) north-east of the regional capital Szczecin.

For the history of the region, see History of Pomerania.

The village has a population of 180.
