= Zalesie, Sławno County =

Zalesie
- Village
- Location within Poland
- Coordinates: 54°14′36″N 16°39′48″E
- Country: Poland
- Voivodeship: West Pomeranian
- County: Sławno
- Gmina: Malechowo
- Time zone: UTC+1 (CET)
  - Summer (DST): UTC+2 (CEST)
- Vehicle registration: ZSL

Zalesie [zaˈlɛɕɛ] is a village in the administrative district of Gmina Malechowo, within Sławno County, West Pomeranian Voivodeship, in north-western Poland. It lies approximately 13 km (8 mi) south-east of Malechowo, 14 km (9 mi) south of Sławno, and 165 km (103 mi) north-east of the regional capital Szczecin.
