= Sulechówko =

- Village
- Location within Poland
- Coordinates: 54°16′23″N 16°33′2″E
- Country: Poland
- Voivodeship: West Pomeranian
- County: Sławno
- Gmina: Malechowo
- Population: 160

Sulechówko [sulɛˈxufkɔ] is a village in the administrative district of Gmina Malechowo, within Sławno County, West Pomeranian Voivodeship, in north-western Poland. It lies approximately 5 km (3 mi) south-east of Malechowo, 14 km (9 mi) south-west of Sławno, and 161 km (100 mi) north-east of the regional capital Szczecin.

For the history of the region, see History of Pomerania.

The village has a population of 160.
