= Lejkowo, West Pomeranian Voivodeship =

Lejkowo
- Village
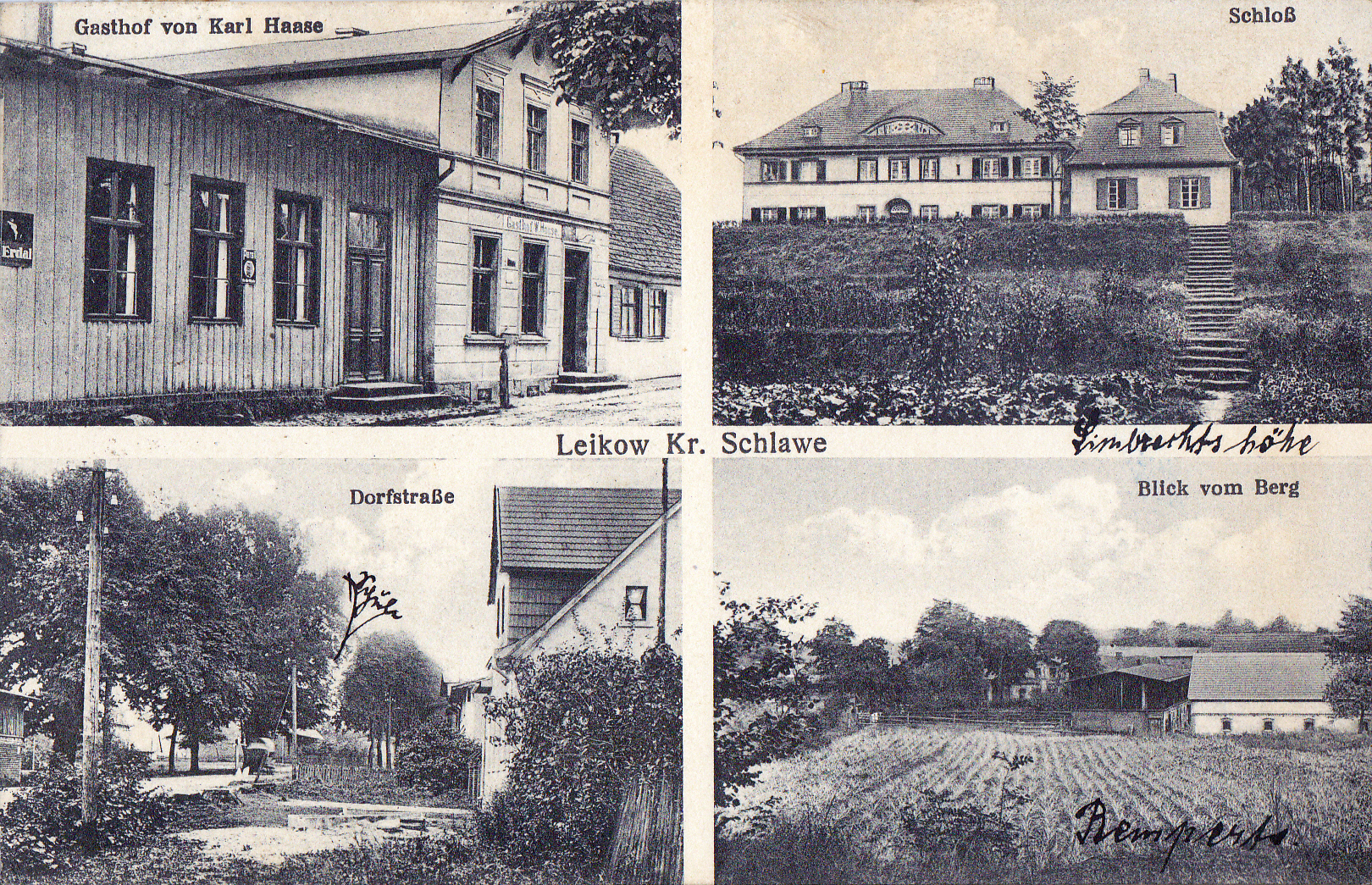
- Lejkowo (German: Leikow), postcard sent on May 21, 1928. From the top: Karl Hasse Inn; School; Village road; View from the nearby hill. Publisher:Photograph Georg Schier.

- Location within Poland
- Coordinates: 54°14′51″N 16°35′9″E
- Country: Poland
- Voivodeship: West Pomeranian
- County: Sławno
- Gmina: Malechowo
- Population: 180

Lejkowo [lɛi̯ˈkɔvɔ] (German Leikow) is a village in the administrative district of Gmina Malechowo, within Sławno County, West Pomeranian Voivodeship, in north-western Poland. It lies approximately 9 km (6 mi) south-east of Malechowo, 15 km (9 mi) south-west of Sławno, and 161 km (100 mi) north-east of the regional capital Szczecin.

For the history of the region, see History of Pomerania.

The village has a population of 180.
