= Kukułczyn =

- Settlement
- Location within Poland
- Coordinates: 54°15′53″N 16°33′50″E
- Country: Poland
- Voivodeship: West Pomeranian
- County: Sławno
- Gmina: Malechowo

Kukułczyn [kuˈkuu̯t͡ʂɨn] (formerly German Neuwelt) is a settlement in the administrative district of Gmina Malechowo, within Sławno County, West Pomeranian Voivodeship, in north-western Poland. It lies approximately 6 km (4 mi) south-east of Malechowo, 14 km (9 mi) south-west of Sławno, and 161 km (100 mi) north-east of the regional capital Szczecin.

== See also ==
- History of Pomerania
