= Podgórki, West Pomeranian Voivodeship =

Podgórki
- Village
- Location within Poland
- Coordinates: 54°16′27″N 16°38′5″E
- Country: Poland
- Voivodeship: West Pomeranian
- County: Sławno
- Gmina: Malechowo
- Population: 220

Podgórki [pɔdˈɡurki] (German Deutsch Puddiger) is a village in the administrative district of Gmina Malechowo, within Sławno County, West Pomeranian Voivodeship, in north-western Poland. It lies approximately 9 km (6 mi) south-east of Malechowo, 11 km (7 mi) south of Sławno, and 165 km (103 mi) north-east of the regional capital Szczecin.

For the history of the region, see History of Pomerania.

The village has a population of 220.
