= Pięćmiechowo =

- Settlement
- Location within Poland
- Coordinates: 54°19′18″N 16°23′56″E
- Country: Poland
- Voivodeship: West Pomeranian
- County: Sławno
- Gmina: Malechowo

Pięćmiechowo [pjɛnt͡ɕmjɛˈxɔvɔ] is a settlement in the administrative district of Gmina Malechowo, within Sławno County, West Pomeranian Voivodeship, in north-western Poland. It lies approximately 8 km (5 mi) west of Malechowo, 20 km (12 mi) west of Sławno, and 156 km (97 mi) north-east of the regional capital Szczecin.

For the history of the region, see History of Pomerania.
