= Uniedrożyn =

- Settlement
- Location within Poland
- Coordinates: 54°17′52″N 16°24′30″E
- Country: Poland
- Voivodeship: West Pomeranian
- County: Sławno
- Gmina: Malechowo

Uniedrożyn [uɲɛˈdrɔʐɨn] is a settlement in the administrative district of Gmina Malechowo, within Sławno County, West Pomeranian Voivodeship, in north-western Poland. It lies approximately 7 km (4 mi) west of Malechowo, 20 km (12 mi) south-west of Sławno, and 155 km (96 mi) north-east of the regional capital Szczecin.

For the history of the region, see History of Pomerania.
