= Nowy Żytnik =

- Village
- Location within Poland
- Coordinates: 54°15′3″N 16°41′10″E
- Country: Poland
- Voivodeship: West Pomeranian
- County: Sławno
- Gmina: Malechowo

Nowy Żytnik [ˈnɔvɨ ˈʐɨtnik] (formerly German Neue Mühle) is a village in the administrative district of Gmina Malechowo, within Sławno County, West Pomeranian Voivodeship, in north-western Poland. It lies approximately 13 km (8 mi) south-east of Malechowo, 13 km (8 mi) south of Sławno, and 167 km (104 mi) north-east of the regional capital Szczecin.

For the history of the region, see History of Pomerania.
