= Karwice, Sławno County =

Karwice
- Village
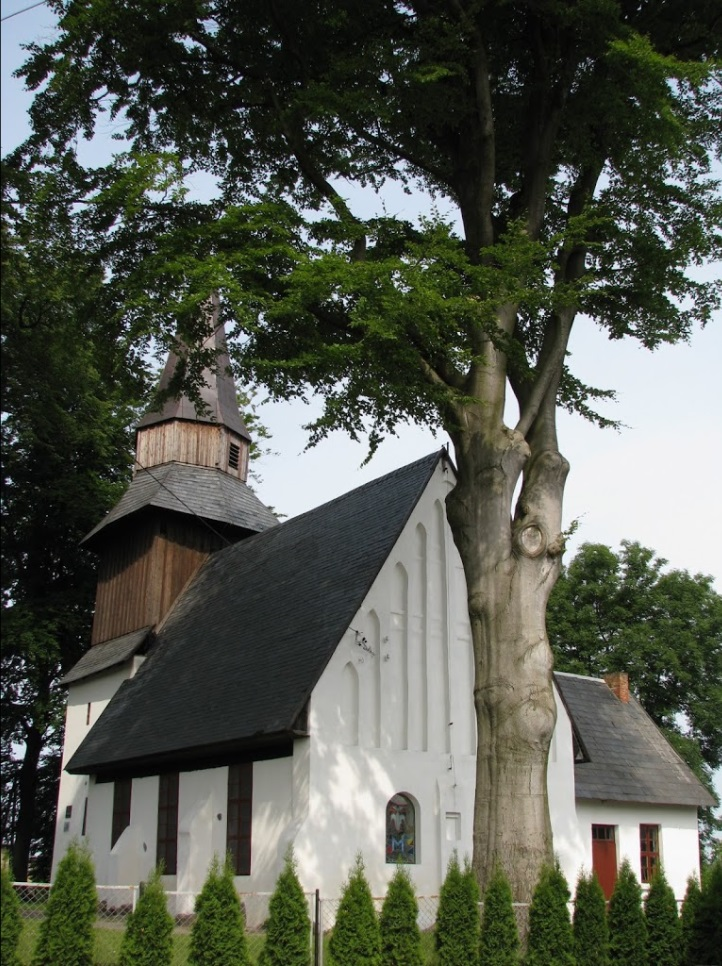
- Church in the village

- Location within Poland
- Coordinates: 54°19′52″N 16°33′37″E
- Country: Poland
- Voivodeship: West Pomeranian
- County: Sławno
- Gmina: Malechowo

Population
  - Total: 410

Karwice [karˈvit͡sɛ] (German: Karwitz) is a village in the administrative district of Gmina Malechowo, within Sławno County, West Pomeranian Voivodeship, in north-western Poland. It lies approximately 4 km (2 mi) north-east of Malechowo, 9 km (6 mi) south-west of Sławno, and 165 km (103 mi) north-east of the regional capital Szczecin, and has a population of 410.

== Notable residents ==
- Franz Pieper (1852-1931), Lutheran theologian

== See also ==
- History of Pomerania
