= Przystawy, Sławno County =

Przystawy
- Village
- Location within Poland
- Coordinates: 54°19′9″N 16°24′57″E
- Country: Poland
- Voivodeship: West Pomeranian
- County: Sławno
- Gmina: Malechowo

Przystawy [pʂɨsˈtavɨ] (German Pirbstow) is a village in the administrative district of Gmina Malechowo, within Sławno County, West Pomeranian Voivodeship, in north-western Poland. It lies approximately 7 km (4 mi) west of Malechowo, 19 km (12 mi) west of Sławno, and 157 km (98 mi) north-east of the regional capital Szczecin.

For the history of the region, see History of Pomerania.
