= Miłomyśl =

- Settlement
- Location within Poland
- Coordinates: 54°21′2″N 16°32′40″E
- Country: Poland
- Voivodeship: West Pomeranian
- County: Sławno
- Gmina: Malechowo

Miłomyśl [miˈwɔmɨɕl] is a settlement in the administrative district of Gmina Malechowo, within Sławno County, West Pomeranian Voivodeship, in north-western Poland. It lies approximately 6 km (4 mi) north-east of Malechowo, 10 km (6 mi) west of Sławno, and 166 km (103 mi) north-east of the regional capital Szczecin.

For the history of the region, see History of Pomerania.
