= Białęciniec =

- Settlement
- Location within Poland
- Coordinates: 54°15′55″N 16°38′38″E
- Country: Poland
- Voivodeship: West Pomeranian
- County: Sławno
- Gmina: Malechowo

Białęciniec [bjawɛnˈt͡ɕiɲɛt͡s] is a settlement in the administrative district of Gmina Malechowo, within Sławno County, West Pomeranian Voivodeship, in north-western Poland. It lies approximately 10 km (6 mi) south-east of Malechowo, 12 km (7 mi) south of Sławno, and 165 km (103 mi) north-east of the regional capital Szczecin.

For the history of the region, see History of Pomerania.
