= Niemica, Sławno County =

Niemica
- Village
- Location within Poland
- Coordinates: 54°16′32″N 16°28′49″E
- Country: Poland
- Voivodeship: West Pomeranian
- County: Sławno
- Gmina: Malechowo
- Population: 360

Niemica [ɲɛˈmit͡sa] (German: Nemitz) is a village in the administrative district of Gmina Malechowo, within Sławno County, West Pomeranian Voivodeship, in north-western Poland. It lies approximately 5 km (3 mi) south-west of Malechowo, 17 km (11 mi) south-west of Sławno, and 157 km (98 mi) north-east of the regional capital Szczecin.

For the history of the region, see History of Pomerania.

The village has a population of 360.
