= Kawno, Sławno County =

Kawno
- Village
- Location within Poland
- Coordinates: 54°15′38″N 16°24′25″E
- Country: Poland
- Voivodeship: West Pomeranian
- County: Sławno
- Gmina: Malechowo

Kawno [ˈkavnɔ] (formerly German Kaunow) is a village in the administrative district of Gmina Malechowo, within Sławno County, West Pomeranian Voivodeship, in north-western Poland. It lies approximately 9 km (6 mi) south-west of Malechowo, 22 km (14 mi) south-west of Sławno, and 153 km (95 mi) north-east of the regional capital Szczecin.

For the history of the region, see History of Pomerania.

== Transport ==
The S6 expressway bypasses Kawno to the north. Exit 27 of the S6 expressway allows for quick access to Sianów and Sławno. Upon the opening of the S6 expressway in December 2025, national road 6 (which formerly ran through Kawno) was re-numbered to minor road 112. The nearest railway station to Kawno is Karwice (20km to the east).
