= Darskowo, Sławno County =

Darskowo
- Village
- Location within Poland
- Coordinates: 54°14′42″N 16°33′52″E
- Country: Poland
- Voivodeship: West Pomeranian
- County: Sławno
- Gmina: Malechowo
- Population: 80

Darskowo [darsˈkɔvɔ] is a village in the administrative district of Gmina Malechowo, within Sławno County, West Pomeranian Voivodeship, in north-western Poland. It lies approximately 8 km (5 mi) south-east of Malechowo, 16 km (10 mi) south-west of Sławno, and 160 km (99 mi) north-east of the regional capital Szczecin.

For the history of the region, see History of Pomerania.

The village has a population of 80.
