= Pękanino, Sławno County =

Pękanino
- Village
- Location within Poland
- Coordinates: 54°16′19″N 16°25′32″E
- Country: Poland
- Voivodeship: West Pomeranian
- County: Sławno
- Gmina: Malechowo
- Population: 340

Pękanino [pɛnkaˈninɔ] (German Panknin) is a village in the administrative district of Gmina Malechowo, within Sławno County, West Pomeranian Voivodeship, in north-western Poland. It lies approximately 7 km (4 mi) south-west of Malechowo, 20 km (12 mi) south-west of Sławno, and 154 km (96 mi) north-east of the regional capital Szczecin.

For the history of the region, see History of Pomerania.

The village has a population of 340.

== Transport ==
The S6 expressway bypasses Pękanino to the north. Exit 27 of the expressway provides quick access to Sianów and Sławno. Upon the opening of the S6 expressway in December 2025, national road 6 (which formerly ran through Pękanino) was re-numbered as minor road 112. The nearest railway station to Pękanino is Skibno (13 km to the west).
