= Laski, Sławno County =

Laski
- Village
- Location within Poland
- Coordinates: 54°12′7″N 16°34′28″E
- Country: Poland
- Voivodeship: West Pomeranian
- County: Sławno
- Gmina: Malechowo

Laski [ˈlaski] is a village in the administrative district of Gmina Malechowo, within Sławno County, West Pomeranian Voivodeship, in north-western Poland. It lies approximately 13 km (8 mi) south of Malechowo, 20 km (12 mi) south of Sławno, and 158 km (98 mi) north-east of the regional capital Szczecin.

For the history of the region, see History of Pomerania.
