= Voivodeship road 205 =

Road in Poland

Voivodeship Road 205
- Droga wojewódzka nr 205

Route information
- Existed: 1985 or 1986–present

Major junctions
- From: DW 165 Bobolice
- To: Darłowo

Location
- Country: Poland

Highway system
- National roads in Poland; Voivodeship roads

Voivodeship road 205 is a 80.5 kilometres (50.0 miles) road in Poland. The major settlements on the road is Darłówko, Darłowo, Krupy, Stary Jarosław, Pątnowo, Grzybno, Sławno, Polanów and Bobolice.

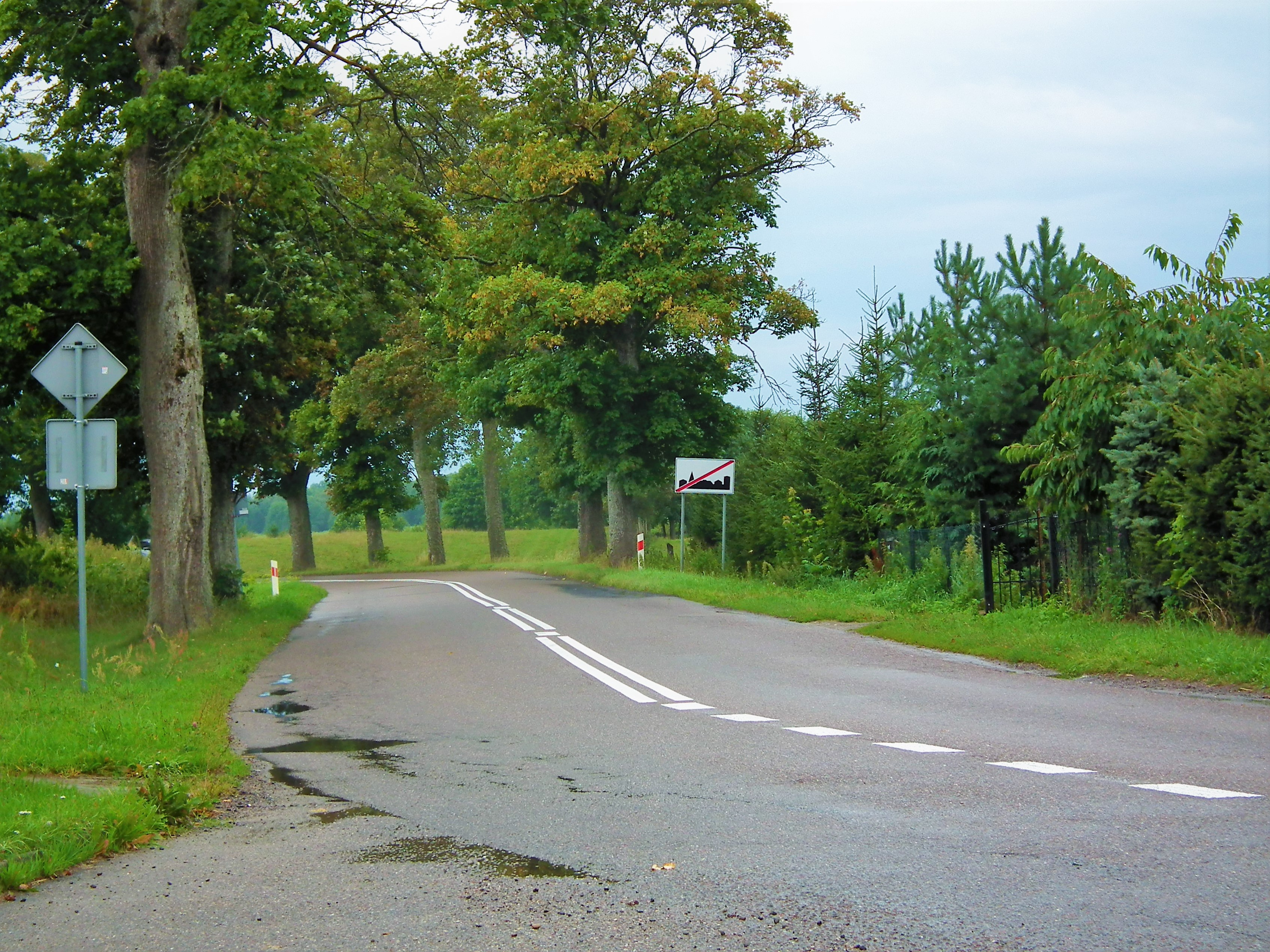
Voivodeship road 205
