= Bartolino =

- Village
- Location within Poland
- Coordinates: 54°16′27″N 16°30′41″E
- Country: Poland
- Voivodeship: West Pomeranian
- County: Sławno
- Gmina: Malechowo
- Population: 120

Bartolino [bartɔˈlinɔ] (formerly German Bartlin) is a village in the administrative district of Gmina Malechowo, within Sławno County, West Pomeranian Voivodeship, in north-western Poland. It lies approximately 4 km (2 mi) south of Malechowo, 16 km (10 mi) south-west of Sławno, and 159 km (99 mi) north-east of the regional capital Szczecin.

For the history of the region, see History of Pomerania.

The village has a population of 120.
