= Sulechowo =

- Village
- Location within Poland
- Coordinates: 54°16′N 16°32′E
- Country: Poland
- Voivodeship: West Pomeranian
- County: Sławno
- Gmina: Malechowo

Sulechowo [sulɛˈxɔvɔ] (German: Soltikow) is a village in the administrative district of Gmina Malechowo, within Sławno County, West Pomeranian Voivodeship, in north-western Poland. It lies approximately 5 km (3 mi) south of Malechowo, 15 km (9 mi) south-west of Sławno, and 160 km (99 mi) north-east of the regional capital Szczecin.

For the history of the region, see History of Pomerania.
