= Lejkówko =

- Settlement
- Location within Poland
- Coordinates: 54°15′33″N 16°34′39″E
- Country: Poland
- Voivodeship: West Pomeranian
- County: Sławno
- Gmina: Malechowo

Lejkówko [lɛi̯ˈkufkɔ] is a settlement in the administrative district of Gmina Malechowo, within Sławno County, West Pomeranian Voivodeship, in north-western Poland. It lies approximately 7 km (4 mi) south-east of Malechowo, 14 km (9 mi) south-west of Sławno, and 161 km (100 mi) north-east of the regional capital Szczecin.

For the history of the region, see History of Pomerania.
