= Baniewo =

- Settlement
- Location within Poland
- Coordinates: 54°18′0″N 16°39′26″E
- Country: Poland
- Voivodeship: West Pomeranian
- County: Sławno
- Gmina: Malechowo

Baniewo [baˈɲɛvɔ] is a settlement in the administrative district of Gmina Malechowo, within Sławno County, West Pomeranian Voivodeship, in north-western Poland. It lies approximately 10 km (6 mi) east of Malechowo, 8 km (5 mi) south of Sławno, and 168 km (104 mi) north-east of the regional capital Szczecin.

For the history of the region, see History of Pomerania.
