= Karwiczki =

- Settlement
- Location within Poland
- Coordinates: 54°18′59″N 16°35′1″E
- Country: Poland
- Voivodeship: West Pomeranian
- County: Sławno
- Gmina: Malechowo

Karwiczki [karˈvit͡ʂki] is a settlement in the administrative district of Gmina Malechowo, within Sławno County, West Pomeranian Voivodeship, in north-western Poland. It lies approximately 5 km (3 mi) east of Malechowo, 9 km (6 mi) south-west of Sławno, and 165 km (103 mi) north-east of the regional capital Szczecin.

For the history of the region, see History of Pomerania.
