= Karw =

- Settlement
- Location within Poland
- Coordinates: 54°18′50″N 16°33′54″E
- Country: Poland
- Voivodeship: West Pomeranian
- County: Sławno
- Gmina: Malechowo

Karw [karf] is a settlement in the administrative district of Gmina Malechowo, within Sławno County, West Pomeranian Voivodeship, in north-western Poland. It lies approximately 4 km (2 mi) east of Malechowo, 10 km (6 mi) south-west of Sławno, and 164 km (102 mi) north-east of the regional capital Szczecin.

For the history of the region, see History of Pomerania.
