= Zielenica, West Pomeranian Voivodeship =

Zielenica
- Village
- Location within Poland
- Coordinates: 54°14′32″N 16°37′11″E
- Country: Poland
- Voivodeship: West Pomeranian
- County: Sławno
- Gmina: Malechowo
- Population: 80

Zielenica [ʑɛlɛˈnit͡sa] (formerly German Söllnitz) is a village in the administrative district of Gmina Malechowo, within Sławno County, West Pomeranian Voivodeship, in north-western Poland. It lies approximately 10 km (6 mi) south-east of Malechowo, 15 km (9 mi) south of Sławno, and 163 km (101 mi) north-east of the regional capital Szczecin.

In the years 1975-1998, the town administratively belonged to the Koszalin Voivodeship. For the history of the region, see History of Pomerania.

The village has a population of 80.
