= Kosierzewo =

- Village
- Location within Poland
- Coordinates: 54°17′49″N 16°41′8″E
- Country: Poland
- Voivodeship: West Pomeranian
- County: Sławno
- Gmina: Malechowo
- Population: 270

Kosierzewo [kɔɕɛˈʐɛvɔ] (German Kusserow) is a village in the administrative district of Gmina Malechowo, within Sławno County, West Pomeranian Voivodeship, in north-western Poland. It lies approximately 12 km (7 mi) east of Malechowo, 8 km (5 mi) south of Sławno, and 170 km (106 mi) north-east of the regional capital Szczecin.

For the history of the region, see History of Pomerania.

The village has a population of 270.
