= Uniesław, West Pomeranian Voivodeship =

Uniesław
- Settlement
- Location within Poland
- Coordinates: 54°17′21″N 16°38′34″E
- Country: Poland
- Voivodeship: West Pomeranian
- County: Sławno
- Gmina: Malechowo

Uniesław [uˈɲɛswaf] (formerly German Felixhof) is a settlement in the administrative district of Gmina Malechowo, within Sławno County, West Pomeranian Voivodeship, in north-western Poland. It lies approximately 9 km (6 mi) east of Malechowo, 9 km (6 mi) south of Sławno, and 167 km (104 mi) north-east of the regional capital Szczecin.

For the history of the region, see History of Pomerania.
