= Drzeńsko, Sławno County =

Drzeńsko
- Village
- Location within Poland
- Coordinates: 54°14′10″N 16°38′37″E
- Country: Poland
- Voivodeship: West Pomeranian
- County: Sławno
- Gmina: Malechowo
- Population: 40

Drzeńsko [ˈdʐɛɲskɔ] (German Drenzig) is a village in the administrative district of Gmina Malechowo, within Sławno County, West Pomeranian Voivodeship, in north-western Poland. It lies approximately 12 km (7 mi) south-east of Malechowo, 15 km (9 mi) south of Sławno, and 164 km (102 mi) north-east of the regional capital Szczecin.

For the history of the region, see History of Pomerania.

The village has a population of 40.
