= Brzeście, West Pomeranian Voivodeship =

Brzeście
- Village
- Location within Poland
- Coordinates: 54°17′18″N 16°46′25″E
- Country: Poland
- Voivodeship: West Pomeranian
- County: Sławno
- Gmina: Gmina Sławno
- Population: 208

Brzeście [ˈbʐɛɕt͡ɕɛ] is a village in the administrative district of Gmina Sławno, within Sławno County, West Pomeranian Voivodeship, in north-western Poland. It lies approximately 11 km (7 mi) south-east of Sławno and 174 km (108 mi) north-east of the regional capital Szczecin.

For the history of the region, see History of Pomerania.

The village has a population of 208.
