= Żabno, West Pomeranian Voivodeship =

Żabno
- Village
- Location within Poland
- Coordinates: 54°23′6″N 16°50′57″E
- Country: Poland
- Voivodeship: West Pomeranian
- County: Sławno
- Gmina: Gmina Sławno

Żabno [ˈʐabnɔ] is a village in the administrative district of Gmina Sławno, within Sławno County, West Pomeranian Voivodeship, in north-western Poland. It lies approximately 11 km (7 mi) east of Sławno and 184 km (114 mi) north-east of the regional capital Szczecin.

For the history of the region, see History of Pomerania.
