= Paprotki, West Pomeranian Voivodeship =

Paprotki
- Village
- Location within Poland
- Coordinates: 54°17′55″N 16°32′26″E
- Country: Poland
- Voivodeship: West Pomeranian
- County: Sławno
- Gmina: Malechowo

Paprotki [paˈprɔtki] is a village in the administrative district of Gmina Malechowo, within Sławno County, West Pomeranian Voivodeship, in north-western Poland. It lies approximately 2 km (1 mi) south-east of Malechowo, 12 km (7 mi) south-west of Sławno, and 162 km (101 mi) north-east of the regional capital Szczecin.

For the history of the region, see History of Pomerania.
