= Łętowo, West Pomeranian Voivodeship =

Łętowo
- Village
- Location within Poland
- Coordinates: 54°16′55″N 16°48′55″E
- Country: Poland
- Voivodeship: West Pomeranian
- County: Sławno
- Gmina: Gmina Sławno
- Population: 292

Łętowo [wɛnˈtɔvɔ] (formerly German Lantow) is a village in the administrative district of Gmina Sławno, within Sławno County, West Pomeranian Voivodeship, in northwestern Poland. It lies approximately 13 km (8 mi) southeast of Sławno and 176 km (109 mi) northeast of the regional capital Szczecin.

For the history of the region, see History of Pomerania.

The village has a population of 292.
