= Chomiec =

- Settlement
- Location within Poland
- Coordinates: 54°14′30″N 16°43′38″E
- Country: Poland
- Voivodeship: West Pomeranian
- County: Sławno
- Gmina: Gmina Sławno

Chomiec [ˈxɔmjɛt͡s] is a settlement in the administrative district of Gmina Sławno, within Sławno County, West Pomeranian Voivodeship, in north-western Poland. It lies approximately 15 km (9 mi) south of Sławno and 168 km (104 mi) north-east of the regional capital Szczecin.

For the history of the region, see History of Pomerania.
