= Borzyszkowiec =

- Settlement
- Location within Poland
- Coordinates: 54°25′9″N 16°32′45″E
- Country: Poland
- Voivodeship: West Pomeranian
- County: Sławno
- Gmina: Gmina Sławno

Borzyszkowiec [bɔʐɨʂˈkɔvjɛt͡s] is a settlement in the administrative district of Gmina Sławno, within Sławno County, West Pomeranian Voivodeship, in north-western Poland. It lies approximately 11 km (7 mi) north-west of Sławno and 171 km (106 mi) north-east of the regional capital Szczecin.
