= Krakowiany, West Pomeranian Voivodeship =

Krakowiany
- Settlement
- Location within Poland
- Coordinates: 54°25′40″N 16°38′2″E
- Country: Poland
- Voivodeship: West Pomeranian
- County: Sławno
- Gmina: Gmina Sławno

Krakowiany [krakɔˈvjanɨ] is a settlement in the administrative district of Gmina Sławno, within Sławno County, West Pomeranian Voivodeship, in north-western Poland. It lies approximately 8 km (5 mi) north-west of Sławno and 176 km (109 mi) north-east of the regional capital Szczecin.

For the history of the region, see History of Pomerania.
