= Stary Kraków =

- Village
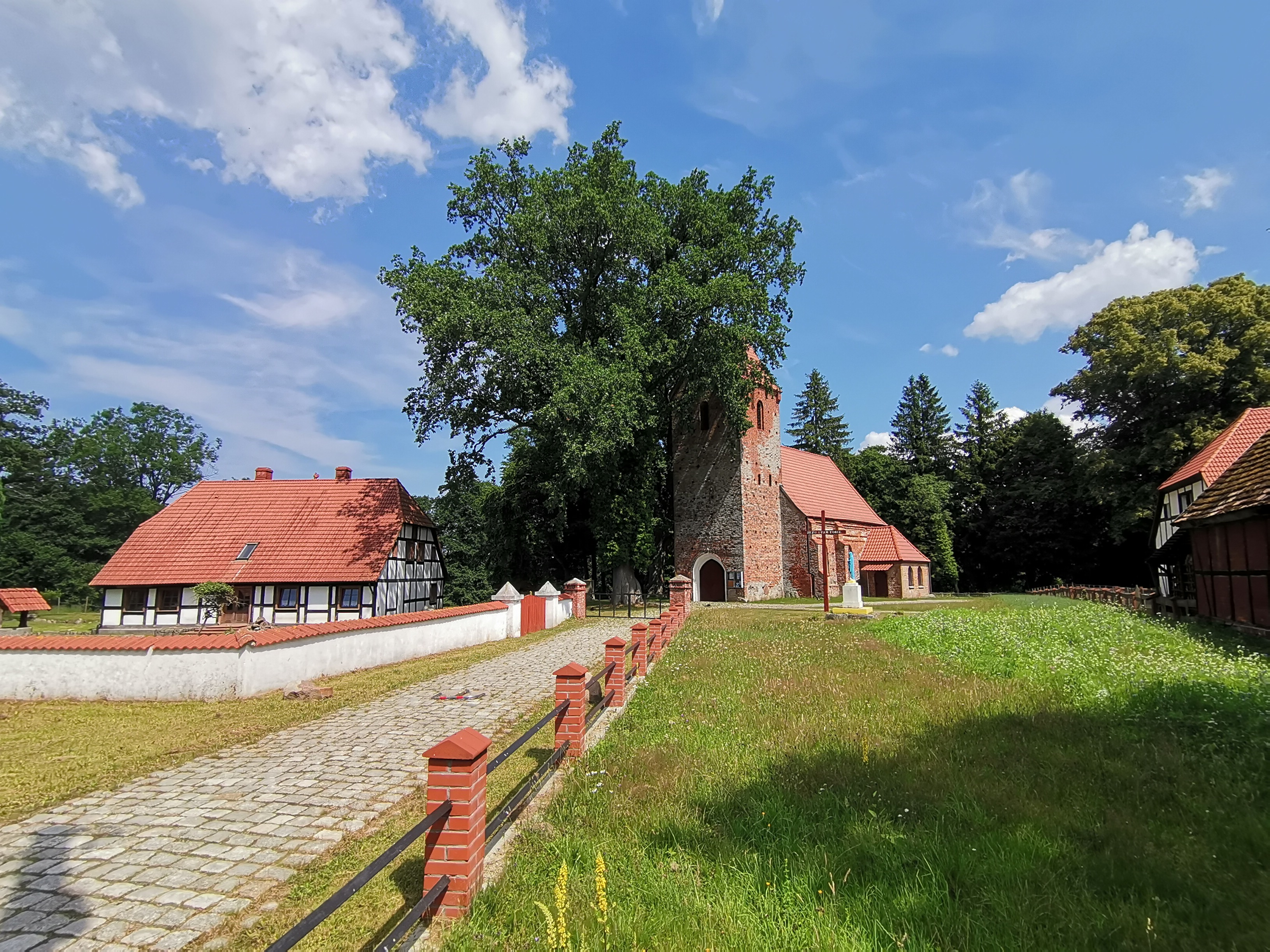

- Location within Poland
- Coordinates: 54°26′19″N 16°36′58″E
- Country: Poland
- Voivodeship: West Pomeranian
- County: Sławno
- Gmina: Gmina Sławno

Stary Kraków (Polish pronunciation: [ˈstarɨ ˈkrakuf]; German: Alt Krakow) is a village in the administrative district of Gmina Sławno, within Sławno County, West Pomeranian Voivodeship, in north-western Poland. It lies approximately 10 km (6 mi) north-west of Sławno and 175 km (109 mi) north-east of the regional capital Szczecin.

For the history of the region, see History of Pomerania.
