= Włodzisław, Sławno County =

Włodzisław
- Settlement
- Location within Poland
- Coordinates: 54°13′54″N 16°38′21″E
- Country: Poland
- Voivodeship: West Pomeranian
- County: Sławno
- Gmina: Malechowo

Włodzisław [vwɔˈd͡ʑiswaf] (formerly German: Lerchenhain) is a settlement in the administrative district of Gmina Malechowo, within Sławno County, West Pomeranian Voivodeship, in north-western Poland. It lies approximately 12 km (7 mi) south-east of Malechowo, 16 km (10 mi) south of Sławno, and 163 km (101 mi) north-east of the regional capital Szczecin.

For the history of the region, see History of Pomerania.
