= Pomiłowo =

- Village
- Location within Poland
- Coordinates: 54°20′19″N 16°42′37″E
- Country: Poland
- Voivodeship: West Pomeranian
- County: Sławno
- Gmina: Gmina Sławno

Pomiłowo [pɔmiˈwɔvɔ] (German: Marienthal) is a village in the administrative district of Gmina Sławno, within Sławno County, West Pomeranian Voivodeship, in north-western Poland. It lies approximately 4 km (2 mi) south-east of Sławno and 174 km (108 mi) north-east of the regional capital Szczecin.

For the history of the region, see History of Pomerania.
