= Radosław, West Pomeranian Voivodeship =

Radosław
- Village
- Location within Poland
- Coordinates: 54°25′9″N 16°40′45″E
- Country: Poland
- Voivodeship: West Pomeranian
- County: Sławno
- Gmina: Gmina Sławno
- Population: 260

Radosław [raˈdɔswaf] (German: Coccejendorf) is a village in the administrative district of Gmina Sławno, within Sławno County, West Pomeranian Voivodeship, in north-western Poland. It lies approximately 6 km (4 mi) north of Sławno and 177 km (110 mi) north-east of the regional capital Szczecin.

For the history of the region, see History of Pomerania.

The village has a population of 260.
