= Łany, West Pomeranian Voivodeship =

Łany
- Settlement
- Location within Poland
- Coordinates: 54°21′50″N 16°34′56″E
- Country: Poland
- Voivodeship: West Pomeranian
- County: Sławno
- Gmina: Gmina Sławno

Łany [ˈwanɨ] is a settlement in the administrative district of Gmina Sławno, within Sławno County, West Pomeranian Voivodeship, in north-western Poland. It lies approximately 7 km (4 mi) west of Sławno and 169 km (105 mi) north-east of the regional capital Szczecin.

For the history of the region, see History of Pomerania.
