= Tokary, West Pomeranian Voivodeship =

Tokary
- Village
- Location within Poland
- Coordinates: 54°25′1″N 16°42′35″E
- Country: Poland
- Voivodeship: West Pomeranian
- County: Sławno
- Gmina: Gmina Sławno

Tokary [tɔˈkarɨ] (German: Deutschrode) is a village in the administrative district of Gmina Sławno, within Sławno County, West Pomeranian Voivodeship, in north-western Poland. It lies approximately 6 km (4 mi) north of Sławno and 179 km (111 mi) north-east of the regional capital Szczecin.

For the history of the region, see History of Pomerania.
