= Boleszewo =

- Village
- Location within Poland
- Coordinates: 54°22′14″N 16°34′41″E
- Country: Poland
- Voivodeship: West Pomeranian
- County: Sławno
- Gmina: Gmina Sławno
- Population: 466

Boleszewo [bɔlɛˈʂɛvɔ] is a village in the administrative district of Gmina Sławno, within Sławno County, West Pomeranian Voivodeship, in north-western Poland. It lies approximately 7 km (4 mi) west of Sławno and 169 km (105 mi) north-east of the regional capital Szczecin.

For the history of the region, see History of Pomerania.

The village has a population of 466.
