= Warginia =

- Village
- Location within Poland
- Coordinates: 54°24′18″N 16°40′12″E
- Country: Poland
- Voivodeship: West Pomeranian
- County: Sławno
- Gmina: Gmina Sławno

Warginia [varˈɡiɲa] is a village in the administrative district of Gmina Sławno, within Sławno County, West Pomeranian Voivodeship, in north-western Poland. It lies approximately 5 km (3 mi) north of Sławno and 176 km (109 mi) north-east of the regional capital Szczecin.

For the history of the region, see History of Pomerania.
