= Przemysławiec =

- Settlement
- Location within Poland
- Coordinates: 54°25′0″N 16°39′48″E
- Country: Poland
- Voivodeship: West Pomeranian
- County: Sławno
- Gmina: Gmina Sławno

Przemysławiec [pʂɛmɨˈswavjɛt͡s] is a settlement in the administrative district of Gmina Sławno, within Sławno County, West Pomeranian Voivodeship, in north-western Poland. It lies approximately 6 km (4 mi) north of Sławno and 176 km (109 mi) north-east of the regional capital Szczecin.

For the history of the region, see History of Pomerania.
