= Żegocino =

- Village
- Location within Poland
- Coordinates: 54°16′58″N 16°36′3″E
- Country: Poland
- Voivodeship: West Pomeranian
- County: Sławno
- Gmina: Malechowo
- Population: 210

Żegocino [ʐɛɡɔˈt͡ɕinɔ] (formerly German Segenthin) is a village in the administrative district of Gmina Malechowo, within Sławno County, West Pomeranian Voivodeship, in north-western Poland. It lies approximately 7 km (4 mi) south-east of Malechowo, 11 km (7 mi) south-west of Sławno, and 164 km (102 mi) north-east of the regional capital Szczecin.

For the history of the region, see History of Pomerania.

The village has a population of 210.

== People ==
- Jakob Friedrich von Rüchel-Kleist (1778-1848), Prussian officer
