= Warszkowo-Kolonia =

- Settlement
- Location within Poland
- Coordinates: 54°21′27″N 16°43′50″E
- Country: Poland
- Voivodeship: West Pomeranian
- County: Sławno
- Gmina: Gmina Sławno

Warszkowo-Kolonia [varʂˈkɔvɔ kɔˈlɔɲa] is a settlement in the administrative district of Gmina Sławno, within Sławno County, West Pomeranian Voivodeship, in north-western Poland. It lies approximately 4 km (2 mi) east of Sławno and 176 km (109 mi) north-east of the regional capital Szczecin.

For the history of the region, see History of Pomerania.
