= Graniczniak =

- Settlement
- Location within Poland
- Coordinates: 54°21′48″N 16°32′22″E
- Country: Poland
- Voivodeship: West Pomeranian
- County: Sławno
- Gmina: Gmina Sławno

Graniczniak [ɡraˈnit͡ʂɲak] is a settlement situated in the administrative district of Gmina Sławno, within Sławno County, West Pomeranian Voivodeship, in north-western Poland. It lies approximately 10 km (6 mi) west of Sławno and 166 km (103 mi) north-east of the regional capital Szczecin.

For the history of the region, see History of Pomerania.
