= Żukówko, West Pomeranian Voivodeship =

Żukówko
- Village
- Location within Poland
- Coordinates: 54°17′58″N 16°47′53″E
- Country: Poland
- Voivodeship: West Pomeranian
- County: Sławno
- Gmina: Gmina Sławno

Żukówko [ʐuˈkufkɔ] is a village in the administrative district of Gmina Sławno, within Sławno County, West Pomeranian Voivodeship, in north-western Poland. It lies approximately 11 km (7 mi) south-east of Sławno and 176 km (109 mi) north-east of the regional capital Szczecin.

For the history of the region, see History of Pomerania.
