= Żukowo, Sławno County =

Żukowo
- Village
- Location within Poland
- Coordinates: 54°17′20″N 16°47′51″E
- Country: Poland
- Voivodeship: West Pomeranian
- County: Sławno
- Gmina: Gmina Sławno
- Population: 340

Żukowo [ʐuˈkɔvɔ] (formerly German Suckow) is a village in the administrative district of Gmina Sławno, within Sławno County, West Pomeranian Voivodeship, in north-western Poland. It lies approximately 12 km (7 mi) south-east of Sławno and 175 km (109 mi) north-east of the regional capital Szczecin.

For the history of the region, see History of Pomerania.

The village has a population of 340.

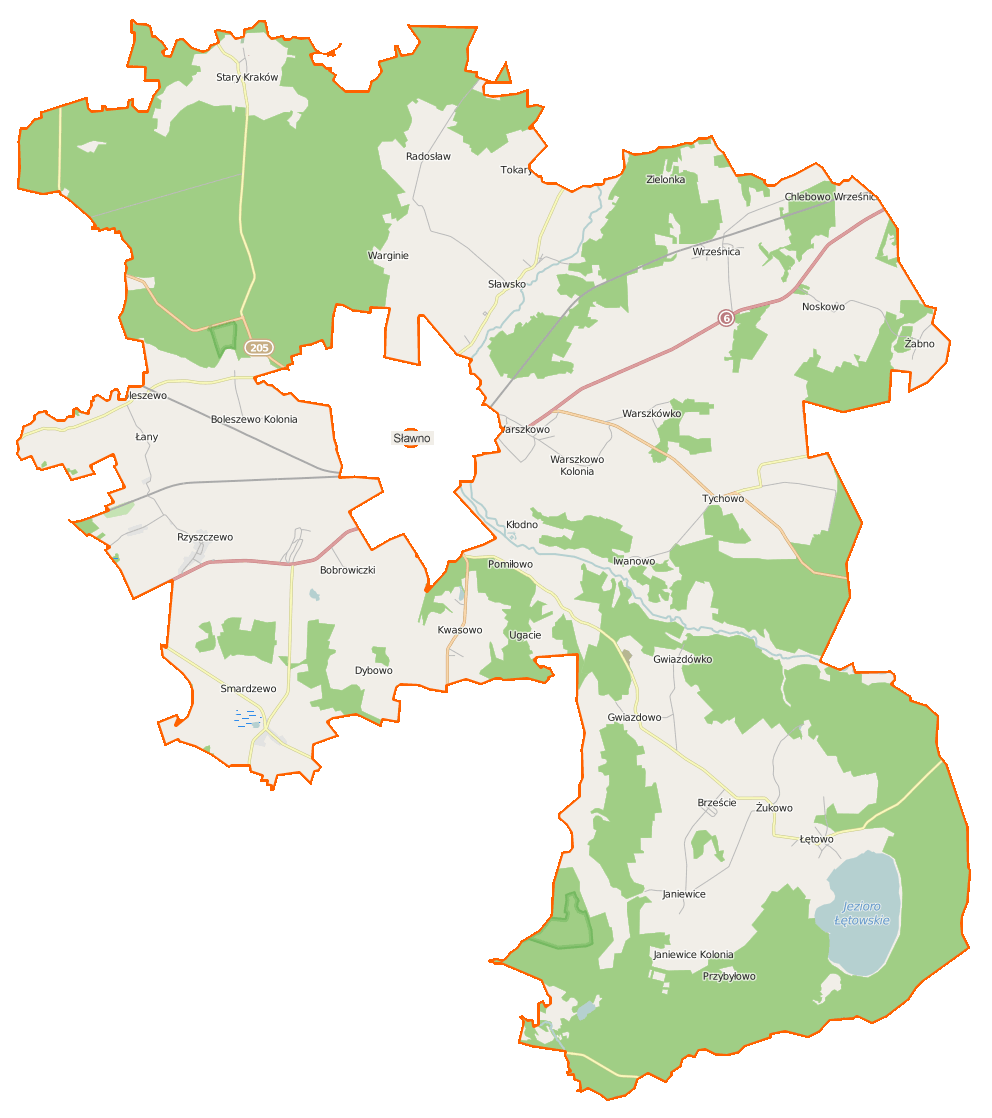
Sławno (gmina wiejska w województwie zachodniopomorskim) location map
