= Gwiazdówko =

- Village
- Location within Poland
- Coordinates: 54°19′11″N 16°45′52″E
- Country: Poland
- Voivodeship: West Pomeranian
- County: Sławno
- Gmina: Gmina Sławno

Gwiazdówko [ɡvjazˈdufkɔ] is a village in the administrative district of Gmina Sławno, within Sławno County, West Pomeranian Voivodeship, in north-western Poland. It lies approximately 8 km (5 mi) south-east of Sławno and 175 km (109 mi) north-east of the regional capital Szczecin.

For the history of the region, see History of Pomerania.
