= Rzyszczewko, Sławno County =

Rzyszczewko
- Village
- Location within Poland
- Coordinates: 54°20′41″N 16°34′44″E
- Country: Poland
- Voivodeship: West Pomeranian
- County: Sławno
- Gmina: Gmina Sławno

Rzyszczewko [ʐɨʂˈt͡ʂɛfkɔ] is a village in the administrative district of Gmina Sławno, within Sławno County, West Pomeranian Voivodeship, in north-western Poland. It lies approximately 8 km (5 mi) west of Sławno and 167 km (104 mi) north-east of the regional capital Szczecin.

For the history of the region, see History of Pomerania.
