= Waliszewo, Sławno County =

Waliszewo
- Settlement
- Location within Poland
- Coordinates: 54°23′19″N 16°39′29″E
- Country: Poland
- Voivodeship: West Pomeranian
- County: Sławno
- Gmina: Gmina Sławno

Waliszewo [valiˈʂɛvɔ] is a settlement in the administrative district of Gmina Sławno, within Sławno County, West Pomeranian Voivodeship, in north-western Poland. It lies approximately 3 km (2 mi) north-west of Sławno and 174 km (108 mi) north-east of the regional capital Szczecin.

For the history of the region, see History of Pomerania.
