= Noskowo, West Pomeranian Voivodeship =

Noskowo
- Village
- Location within Poland
- Coordinates: 54°23′27″N 16°48′45″E
- Country: Poland
- Voivodeship: West Pomeranian
- County: Sławno
- Gmina: Gmina Sławno
- Population: 500

Noskowo [nɔsˈkɔvɔ] (German: Notzkow) is a village in the administrative district of Gmina Sławno, within Sławno County, West Pomeranian Voivodeship, in north-western Poland. It lies approximately 9 km (6 mi) east of Sławno and 182 km (113 mi) north-east of the regional capital Szczecin.

For the history of the region, see History of Pomerania.
