= Bobrowice, West Pomeranian Voivodeship =

Bobrowice
- Village
- Location within Poland
- Coordinates: 54°20′30″N 16°37′57″E
- Country: Poland
- Voivodeship: West Pomeranian
- County: Sławno
- Gmina: Gmina Sławno
- Population: 290

Bobrowice (Polish pronunciation: [bɔbrɔˈvit͡sɛ]; German: Alt Bewersdorf) is a village in the administrative district of Gmina Sławno, within Sławno County, West Pomeranian Voivodeship, in north-western Poland. It lies approximately 5 km (3 mi) south-west of Sławno and 170 km (106 mi) north-east of the regional capital Szczecin.

For the history of the region, see History of Pomerania.

The village has a population of 290.
