= Bobrowiczki =

- Village
- Location within Poland
- Coordinates: 54°20′31″N 16°38′44″E
- Country: Poland
- Voivodeship: West Pomeranian
- County: Sławno
- Gmina: Gmina Sławno
- Population: 392

Bobrowiczki [bɔbrɔˈvit͡ʂki] (German: Neu Bewersdorf) is a village in the administrative district of Gmina Sławno, within Sławno County, West Pomeranian Voivodeship, in north-western Poland. It lies approximately 4 km (2 mi) south-west of Sławno and 170 km (106 mi) north-east of the regional capital Szczecin.

For the history of the region, see History of Pomerania.

The village has a population of 392.
