= Janiewice =

- Village
- Location within Poland
- Coordinates: 54°16′19″N 16°46′3″E
- Country: Poland
- Voivodeship: West Pomeranian
- County: Sławno
- Gmina: Gmina Sławno

Population
  - Total: 529
- Time zone: UTC+1 (CET)
  - Summer (DST): UTC+2 (CEST)
- Vehicle registration: ZSL

Janiewice [jaɲɛˈvit͡sɛ] is a village in the administrative district of Gmina Sławno, within Sławno County, West Pomeranian Voivodeship, in north-western Poland. It lies approximately 12 km (7 mi) south-east of Sławno and 172 km (107 mi) north-east of the regional capital Szczecin.

It is one of the few places of occurrence of cloudberry in Poland.

The village has a population of 529.

== Etymology ==
The name of the village comes from the male name Jan, Polish for John.
