= Kwasowo =

- Village
- Location within Poland
- Coordinates: 54°19′27″N 16°41′21″E
- Country: Poland
- Voivodeship: West Pomeranian
- County: Sławno
- Gmina: Gmina Sławno
- Population: 519

Kwasowo [kfaˈsɔvɔ] (German Quatzow) is a village in the administrative district of Gmina Sławno, within Sławno County, West Pomeranian Voivodeship, in north-western Poland. It lies approximately 5 km (3 mi) south of Sławno and 172 km (107 mi) north-east of the regional capital Szczecin.

For the history of the region, see History of Pomerania.

The village has a population of 519.
