= Boleszewo-Kolonia =

- Settlement
- Location within Poland
- Coordinates: 54°22′0″N 16°37′10″E
- Country: Poland
- Voivodeship: West Pomeranian
- County: Sławno
- Gmina: Gmina Sławno

Boleszewo-Kolonia [bɔlɛˈʂɛvɔ kɔˈlɔɲa] is a settlement in the administrative district of Gmina Sławno, within Sławno County, West Pomeranian Voivodeship, in north-western Poland. It lies approximately 5 km (3 mi) west of Sławno and 171 km (106 mi) north-east of the regional capital Szczecin.

For the history of the region, see History of Pomerania.
