= Warszkówko =

- Village
- Location within Poland
- Coordinates: 54°22′8″N 16°45′16″E
- Country: Poland
- Voivodeship: West Pomeranian
- County: Sławno
- Gmina: Gmina Sławno
- Population: 180

Warszkówko [varʂˈkufkɔ] (German: Neu Warschow) is a village in the administrative district of Gmina Sławno, within Sławno County, West Pomeranian Voivodeship, in north-western Poland. It lies approximately 5 km (3 mi) east of Sławno and 178 km (111 mi) north-east of the regional capital Szczecin.

For the history of the region, see History of Pomerania.

The village has a population of 180.
