= Włodzisław (disambiguation) =

Włodzisław is a Polish male given name.

Włodzisław may also refer to:

- Włodzisław, Goleniów County
- Włodzisław, Sławno County

== See also ==
- Władysław
