= Gmina Malechowo =

Gmina Malechowo Malechowo Commune
- Gmina
- Flag Coat of arms
- Interactive map of Gmina Malechowo
- Coordinates (Malechowo): 54°18′27″N 16°30′50″E
- Country: Poland
- Voivodeship: West Pomeranian
- County: Sławno
- Seat: Malechowo

Area
  - Total: 226.63 km^{2} (87.50 sq mi)

Population (2006)
  - Total: 6,560
  - Density: 28.9/km^{2} (75.0/sq mi)
- Website: http://www.malechowo.pl/

Gmina Malechowo is a rural gmina (administrative district) in Sławno County, West Pomeranian Voivodeship, in north-western Poland. Its seat is the village of Malechowo, which lies approximately 13 kilometres (8 mi) south-west of Sławno and 161 km (100 mi) north-east of the regional capital Szczecin.

The gmina covers an area of 226.63 square kilometres (87.5 sq mi), and as of 2006 its total population is 6,560.

== Villages ==
Gmina Malechowo contains the villages and settlements of Baniewo, Bartolino, Białęciniec, Białęcino, Borkowo, Darskowo, Drzeńsko, Gorzyca, Grabowo, Karw, Karwice, Karwiczki, Kawno, Kosierzewo, Krzekoszewo, Kukułczyn, Kusice, Kusiczki, Laski, Lejkówko, Lejkowo, Malechówko, Malechowo, Miłomyśl, Mułek, Niemica, Nowy Żytnik, Ostrowiec, Paprotki, Paproty, Pękanino, Pięćmiechowo, Podgórki, Przystawy, Sęczkowo, Sulechówko, Sulechowo, Święcianowo, Uniedrożyn, Uniesław, Witosław, Włodzisław, Zalesie, Żegocino and Zielenica.

== Neighbouring gminas ==
Gmina Malechowo is bordered by the gminas of Darłowo, Polanów, Sianów and Sławno.
