= Pątnowo =

- Village
- Location within Poland
- Coordinates: 54°23′36″N 16°34′56″E
- Country: Poland
- Voivodeship: West Pomeranian
- County: Sławno
- Gmina: Gmina Sławno

Pątnowo [pɔntˈnɔvɔ] is a village in the administrative district of Gmina Sławno, within Sławno County, West Pomeranian Voivodeship, in north-western Poland. It lies approximately 8 km (5 mi) north-west of Sławno and 171 km (106 mi) north-east of the regional capital Szczecin.

For the history of the region, see History of Pomerania.
