= Grzybno, Sławno County =

Grzybno
- Village
- Location within Poland
- Coordinates: 54°23′14″N 16°36′57″E
- Country: Poland
- Voivodeship: West Pomeranian
- County: Sławno
- Gmina: Gmina Sławno

Grzybno [ˈɡʐɨbnɔ] is a village in the administrative district of Gmina Sławno, within Sławno County, West Pomeranian Voivodeship, in north-western Poland. It lies approximately 5 km (3 mi) north-west of Sławno and 172 km (107 mi) north-east of the regional capital Szczecin.

For the history of the region, see History of Pomerania.
