= Sławsko =

- Village
- Location within Poland
- Coordinates: 54°23′43″N 16°42′40″E
- Country: Poland
- Voivodeship: West Pomeranian
- County: Sławno
- Gmina: Gmina Sławno
- Elevation: 60 m (200 ft)
- Population: 910

Sławsko [ˈswafskɔ] (German: Alt Schlawe) is a village in the administrative district of Gmina Sławno, within Sławno County, West Pomeranian Voivodeship, in north-western Poland. It lies approximately 4 km (2 mi) north-east of Sławno and 177 km (110 mi) north-east of the regional capital Szczecin.

For the history of the region, see History of Pomerania.

The village has a population of 910.
