= Warszkowo, West Pomeranian Voivodeship =

Warszkowo
- Village
- Location within Poland
- Coordinates: 54°21′57″N 16°42′49″E
- Country: Poland
- Voivodeship: West Pomeranian
- County: Sławno
- Gmina: Gmina Sławno
- Population: 1,107

Warszkowo (Polish pronunciation: [varʂˈkɔvɔ]) (German: Alt Warschow) is a village in the administrative district of Gmina Sławno, within Sławno County, West Pomerani, in north-western Poland. It lies approximately 2 km (1 mi) east of Sławno and 175 km (109 mi) north-east of the regional capital Szczecin.

== Transport ==
The S6 expressway passes just to the south-east of Warszkowo. Exit 32 of the expressway provides quick access to Sławno and to Słupsk. Voivodeship road 209 passes through the village and connects it to Sławno. The nearest railway station is in the town of Sławno. Local buses provide services to Sławno.

For the history of the region, see History of Pomerania.
