= Jakob Friedrich von Rüchel-Kleist =

General of the Infantry Jakob Friedrich von Rüchel-Kleist (25 January 1778, in Segenthin – 15 March 1848, in Danzig) was a Prussian officer during the Napoleonic Wars and a governor of Danzig (Gdansk).
