= Nowy Tomyśl Wind Turbines =

Wind turbine in Nowy Tomyśl, Poland

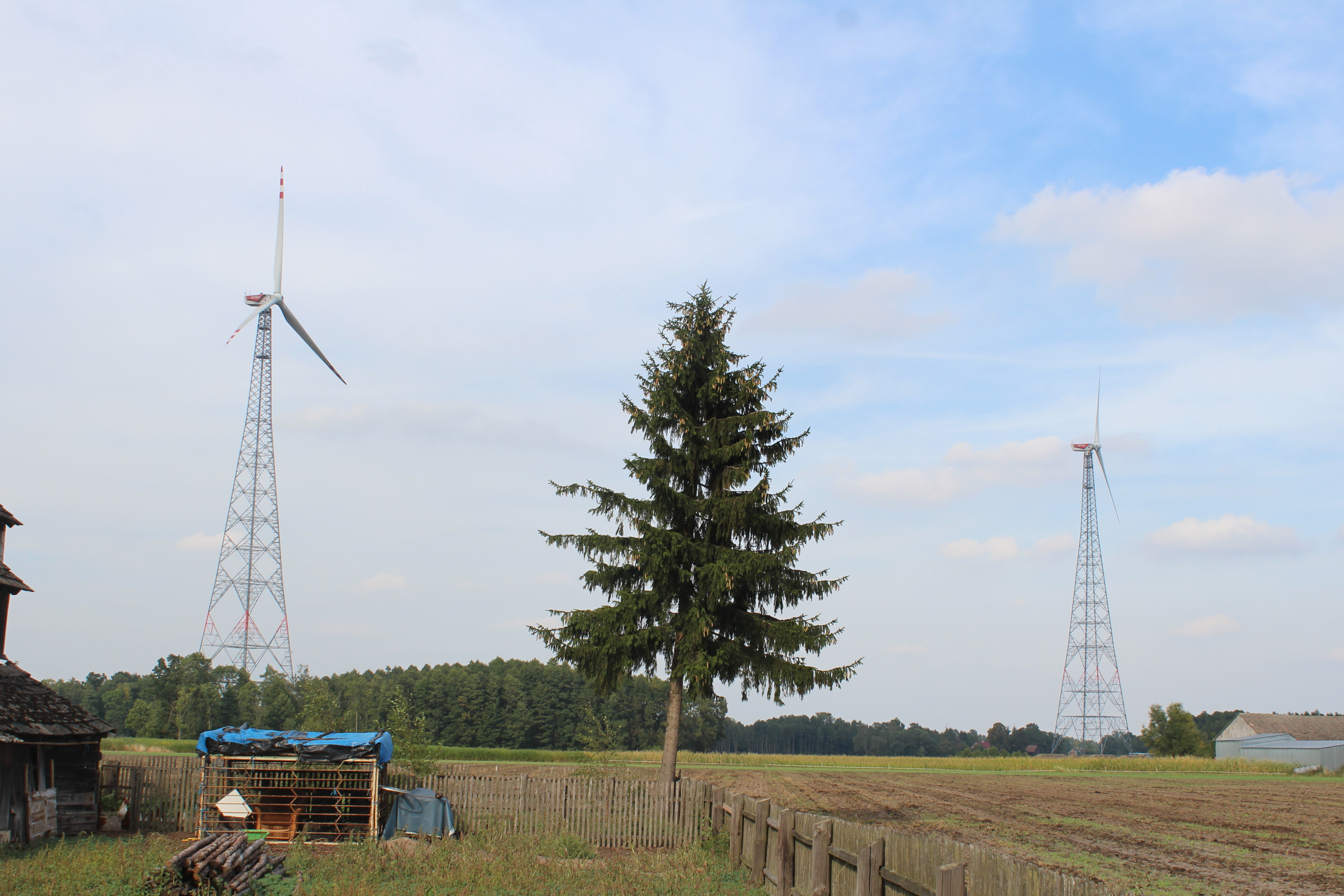
- Country: Poland
- Location: Paproć
- Coordinates: 52°17′41″N 16°09′11″E
- Status: Operational
- Commission date: 2012

External links
- Commons: Related media on Commons

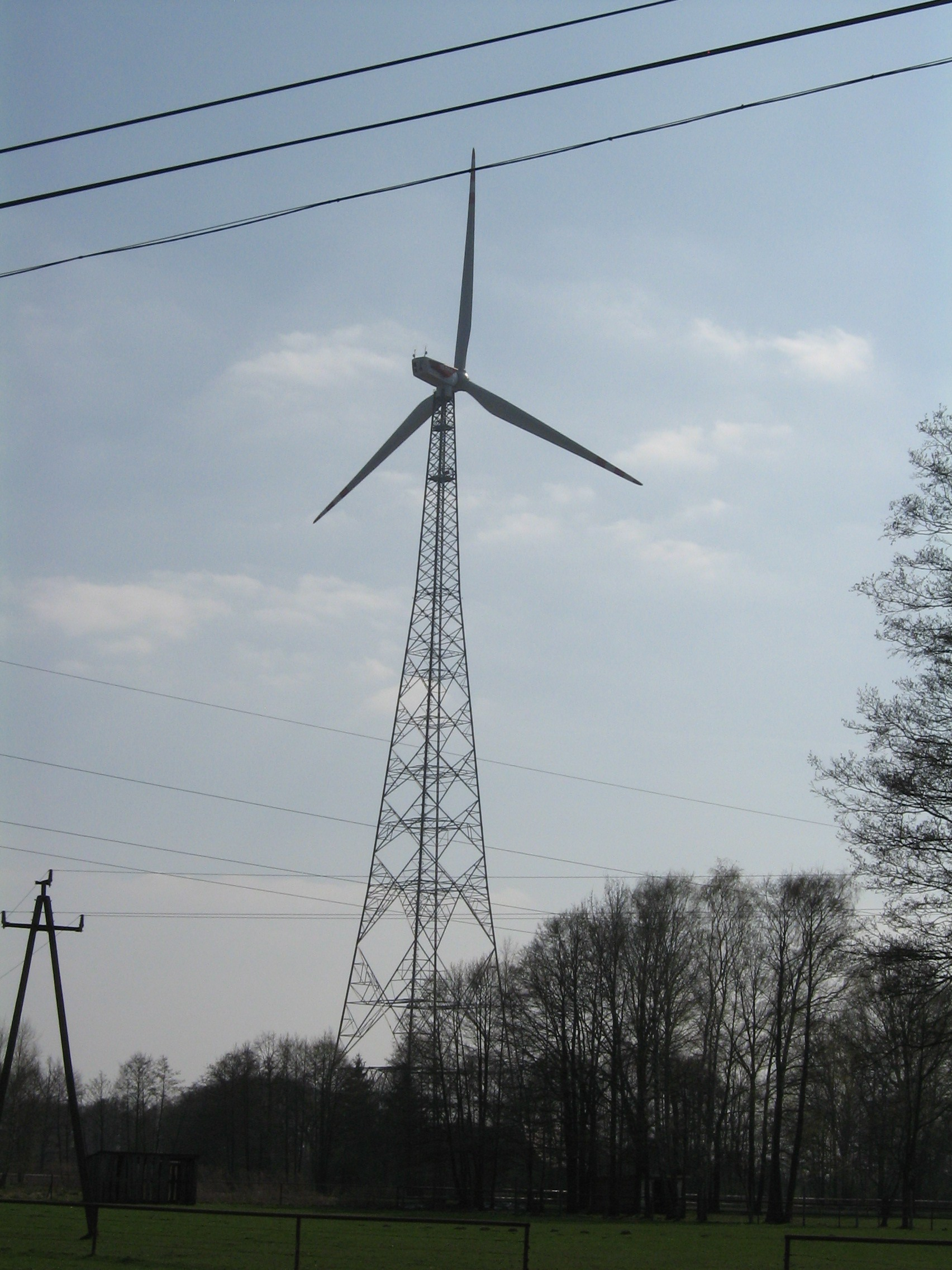

The Nowy Tomyśl Wind Turbines are wind turbines which used to be the tallest in the world. They are situated in Paproć, a village near Nowy Tomyśl in Poland and were erected in 2012. Each of these two wind turbines has a generating capacity of 2500 kW. Both rotors have a diameter of 100 metres and are mounted on 160-metre-tall (520 ft) free-standing lattice towers, which are the tallest free-standing lattice towers in Poland.

The foundation of each of these turbines weighs 1500 tons, the tower 350 tons and the gondola 100 tons.

== Coordinates ==
- 52°17′39.32″N 16°08′57.3″E
- 52°17′41.7″N 16°09′21.3″E
