= Gmina Sławno, West Pomeranian Voivodeship =

Gmina Sławno Sławno Commune
- Gmina
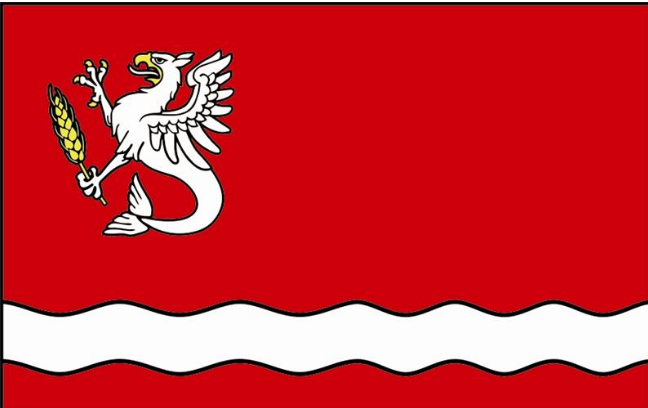
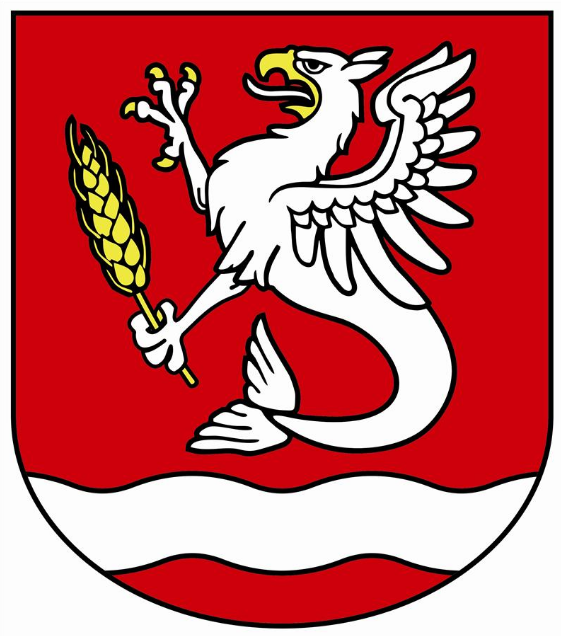
- Flag Coat of arms
- Interactive map of Gmina Sławno
- Coordinates (Sławno): 54°22′N 16°41′E
- Country: Poland
- Voivodeship: West Pomeranian
- County: Sławno
- Seat: Sławno

Area
  - Total: 284.20 km^{2} (109.73 sq mi)

Population (2006)
  - Total: 8,855
  - Density: 31.16/km^{2} (80.70/sq mi)
- Website: http://gminaslawno.pl/

Gmina Sławno is a rural gmina (administrative district) in Sławno County, West Pomeranian Voivodeship, in north-western Poland. Its seat is the town of Sławno, although the town is not part of the territory of the gmina.

The gmina covers an area of 284.20 square kilometres (109.7 sq mi), and as of 2006 its total population is 8,855.

== Villages ==
Gmina Sławno contains the villages and settlements of Bobrowice, Bobrowiczki, Boleszewo, Boleszewo-Kolonia, Borzyszkowiec, Brzeście, Chomiec, Emilianowo, Graniczniak, Grzybno, Gwiazdówko, Gwiazdowo, Janiewice, Krakowiany, Kwasowo, Łany, Łętowo, Noskowo, Pątnowo, Pomiłowo, Przemysławiec, Radosław, Rzyszczewko, Rzyszczewo, Sławsko, Smardzewo, Stary Kraków, Tokary, Tychowo, Waliszewo, Warginia, Warszkówko, Warszkowo, Warszkowo-Kolonia, Wrześnica, Żabno, Żukówko and Żukowo.

== Neighbouring gminas ==
Gmina Sławno is bordered by the town of Sławno and by the gminas of Darłowo, Kępice, Kobylnica, Malechowo, Polanów and Postomino.
