= Franz Pieper =

American Lutheran theologian

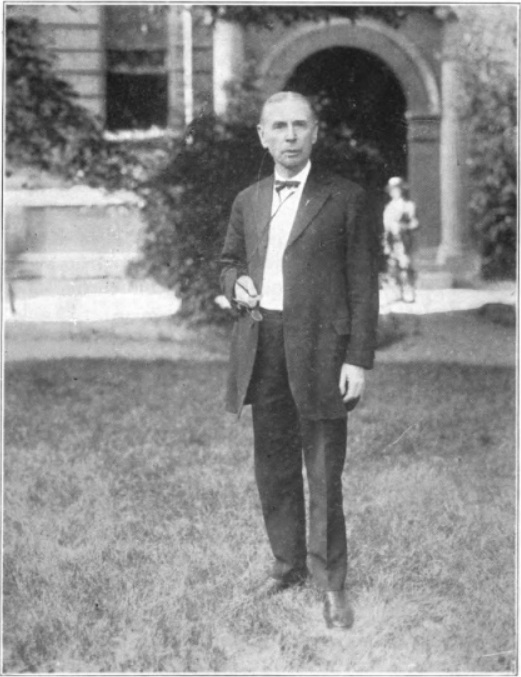
- Franz Pieper at the LCMS convention of 1923 in Fort Wayne, Indiana
- Born: June 27, 1852; Karwitz, Pomerania
- Died: June 3, 1931 (aged 78); St. Louis, Missouri, U.S.
- Education: Northwestern College (1872); Concordia Seminary (1875)

Ecclesiastical career
- Religion: Lutheran
- Church: Lutheran Church – Missouri Synod (LCMS)
- Ordained: July 11, 1875 at Centerville, Wisconsin
- Writings: Christian Dogmatics, Der Lutheraner (periodical)
- Offices held: President, LCMS (1899–1911); President, Concordia Seminary (1887–1931)

Franz August Otto Pieper (often known in English as Francis; June 27, 1852 – June 3, 1931) was a Confessional Lutheran theologian who also served as the fourth president of the Lutheran Church – Missouri Synod, known at that time as the German Evangelical Lutheran Synod of Missouri, Ohio, and Other States.

== Life ==
Pieper was born at Karwitz, Pomerania, (85 miles (137 km) west of Danzig) and died in St. Louis, Missouri. After studying at the gymnasium of Kolberg, Pomerania, he emigrated to the United States in 1870. He graduated from Northwestern College in Watertown, Wisconsin, in 1872 and from Concordia Seminary in St. Louis in 1875. He was a Lutheran pastor from 1875 to 1878, serving first at Centerville, Wisconsin, and then at Manitowoc, Wisconsin. He became a professor of theology at Concordia Seminary in 1878, and served as president of the same institution from 1887 until his death in 1931. He also served as editor of Lehre und Wehre, the faculty journal of Concordia Seminary.

From 1882 to 1899, Pieper served on the Board of Colored Missions for the Evangelical Lutheran Synodical Conference of North America. He also served as the fourth president of the Missouri Synod from 1899 to 1911.

As a systematic theologian, Franz Pieper's magnum opus, Christliche Dogmatik (1917–1924), provided the modern world with a learned and extensive presentation of orthodox Lutheran theology. Translated into English as Christian Dogmatics (1950–1953), it continues to be the basic textbook of doctrinal theology in the Missouri Synod. He was also the main author of A Brief Statement of 1932, an authoritative presentation of the synod's doctrinal stance.

== Works ==
- Christliche Dogmatik. 4 vols. (St. Louis: Concordia Publishing House, 1917–1924) [English translation: Christian Dogmatics. 4 vols. (St. Louis: Concordia Publishing House, 1950–1953)]
  (In German, public domain) Vol I Vol II Vol III
- The Synodical Conference, an essay in The Distinctive Doctrines and Usages of the General Bodies of the Evangelical Lutheran Church in the United States (Philadelphia, 1892), 119-166.
- Gesetz und Evangelium (1892)
- Das Grundbekenntnis der evangelisch-lutherischen Kirche (St. Louis: Concordia Publishing House, 1880).
- Lehre von der Rechtfertigung (1889)
- Unsere Stellung in Lehre und Praxis (St. Louis, 1896)
- Lehrstellung der Missouri-Synode (1897)
- Christ's Work (1898).
- Das Wesen des Christentums (1903)
- Conversion and Election : a Plea for a United Lutheranism (1913, HathiTrust Digital Library)
- What Is Christianity and Other Essays. John Theodore Mueller, tr. (St. Louis: Concordia Publishing House, 1933)

Religious titles
Preceded by H. C. Schwan	President; Lutheran Church–Missouri Synod; 1899–1911	Succeeded by F. Pfotenhauer
