= Borkowo megalithic cemetery =

Prehistoric burial ground in Poland

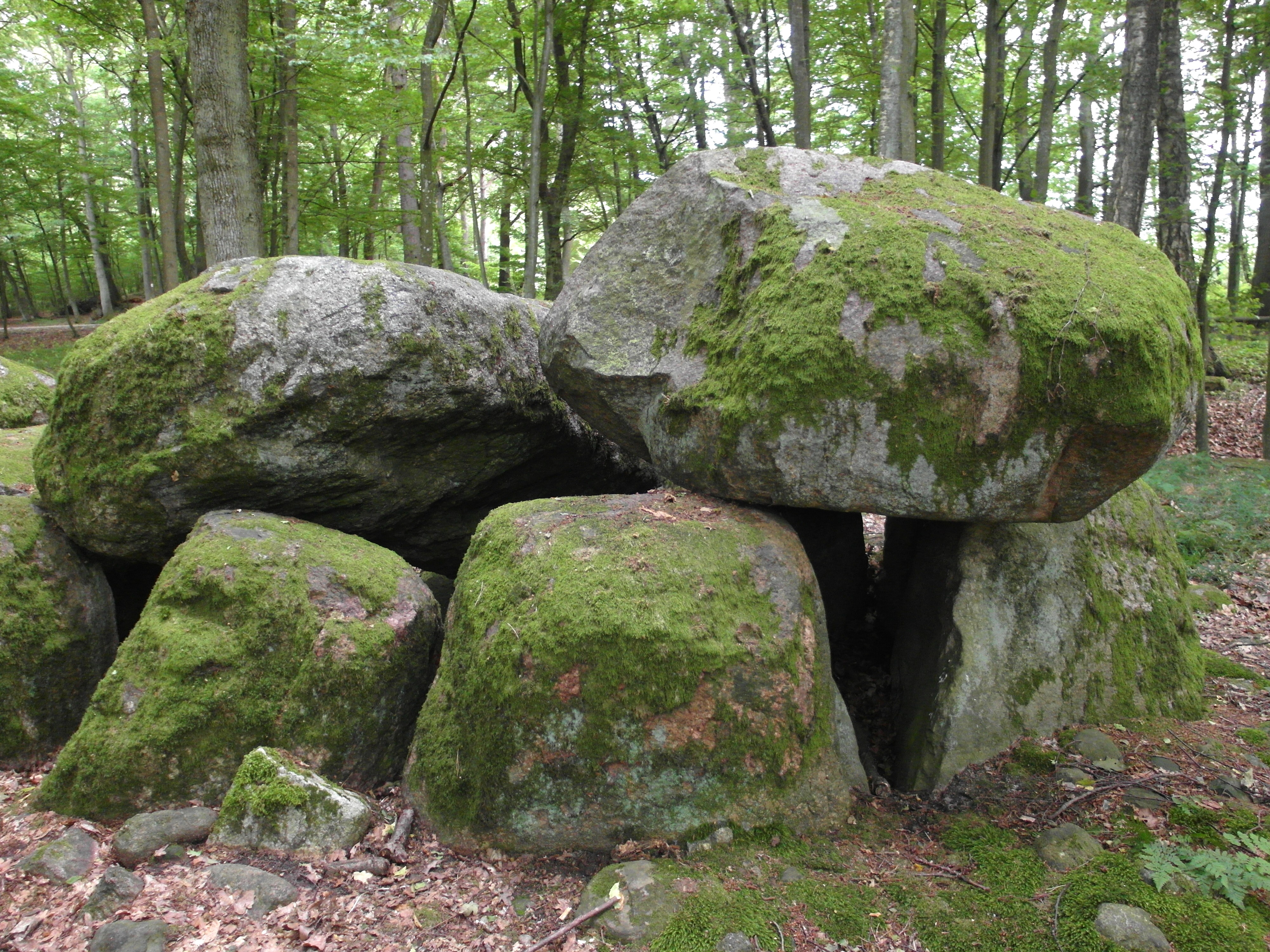
- Borkowo Passage Grave

- Location within Poland
- 54.228700°N 16.597500°E
- Type: Dolmen
- Periods: Copper Age / Bronze Age
- Location: Sławno County

Borkowo megalithic cemetery is a prehistoric burial ground situated in the county of Sławno, in Western Pomerania, Poland.

The site consists of a passage grave, unchambered long barrows, and other tumuli. The most impressive monument, Borkowo 1, is a passage grave made with heavy boulders and capstones. It is around 4.5 metres (15 ft) long, with a width of 1.5 metres (5 ft). Excavations revealed a cremation and a few pottery sherds. The grave is assigned to the Funnelbeaker culture of the Chalcolithic Age.
