= Paprotki =

Paprotki may refer to the following places in Poland:

- Paprotki, Lower Silesian Voivodeship (south-west Poland)
- Paprotki, Warmian-Masurian Voivodeship (north Poland)
- Paprotki, West Pomeranian Voivodeship (north-west Poland)
