= Paprotno =

Paprotno may refer to the following places:

- Paprotno, Masovian Voivodeship (east-central Poland)
- Paprotno, Drawsko County in West Pomeranian Voivodeship (north-west Poland)
- Paprotno, Gryfice County in West Pomeranian Voivodeship (north-west Poland)
- Paprotno, Koszalin County in West Pomeranian Voivodeship (north-west Poland)
