= Paproć, Greater Poland Voivodeship =

Paproć
- Village
- Location within Poland
- Coordinates: 52°18′N 16°8′E
- Country: Poland
- Voivodeship: Greater Poland
- County: Nowy Tomyśl
- Gmina: Nowy Tomyśl
- Population: 716

Paproć [ˈpaprɔt͡ɕ] is a village in the administrative district of Gmina Nowy Tomyśl, within Nowy Tomyśl County, Greater Poland Voivodeship, in west-central Poland.

The Nowy Tomyśl Wind Turbines, two of the tallest in the world, are nearby.
