= Noskowo, Greater Poland Voivodeship =

Noskowo
- Village
- Location within Poland
- Coordinates: 52°24′N 17°31′E
- Country: Poland
- Voivodeship: Greater Poland
- County: Września
- Gmina: Września

Noskowo [nɔsˈkɔvɔ] is a village in the administrative district of Gmina Września, within Września County, Greater Poland Voivodeship, in west-central Poland.
