= Malechowo, Sławno County =

Malechowo
- Village
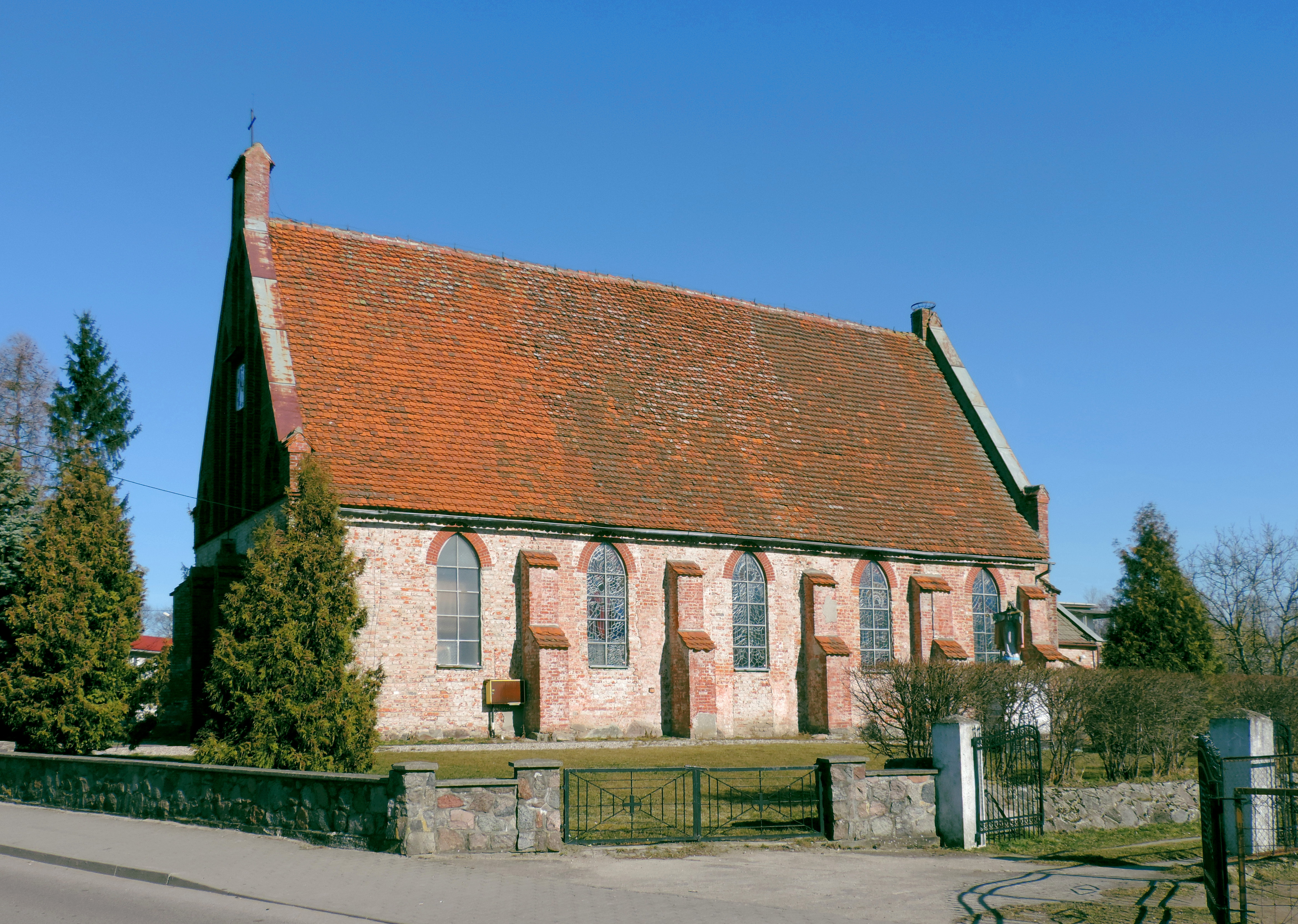
- Church of the presentation of Jesus Christ at the Temple

- Location within Poland
- Coordinates: 54°18′27″N 16°30′50″E
- Country: Poland
- Voivodeship: West Pomeranian
- County: Sławno
- Gmina: Malechowo

Population
  - Total: 589

Malechowo [malɛˈxɔvɔ] (German: Malchow) is a village in Sławno County, West Pomeranian Voivodeship, in north-western Poland. It is the seat of the gmina (administrative district) called Gmina Malechowo. It lies approximately 13 km (8 mi) south-west of Sławno and 161 km (100 mi) north-east of the regional capital Szczecin.

For the history of the region, see History of Pomerania.

The village has a population of 589.

== Transport ==
The S6 expressway bypasses Malechowo to the north. Exit 28 of the expressway provides quick access to Sianów and Sławno. Upon the opening of the S6 expressway in December 2025, national road 6 (which formerly ran through Malechowo) was re-numbered to minor road 112. The nearest railway station to Malechowo is Karwice (17 km to the north-east)
