= Sławno County =

Sławno County Powiat sławieński
- County
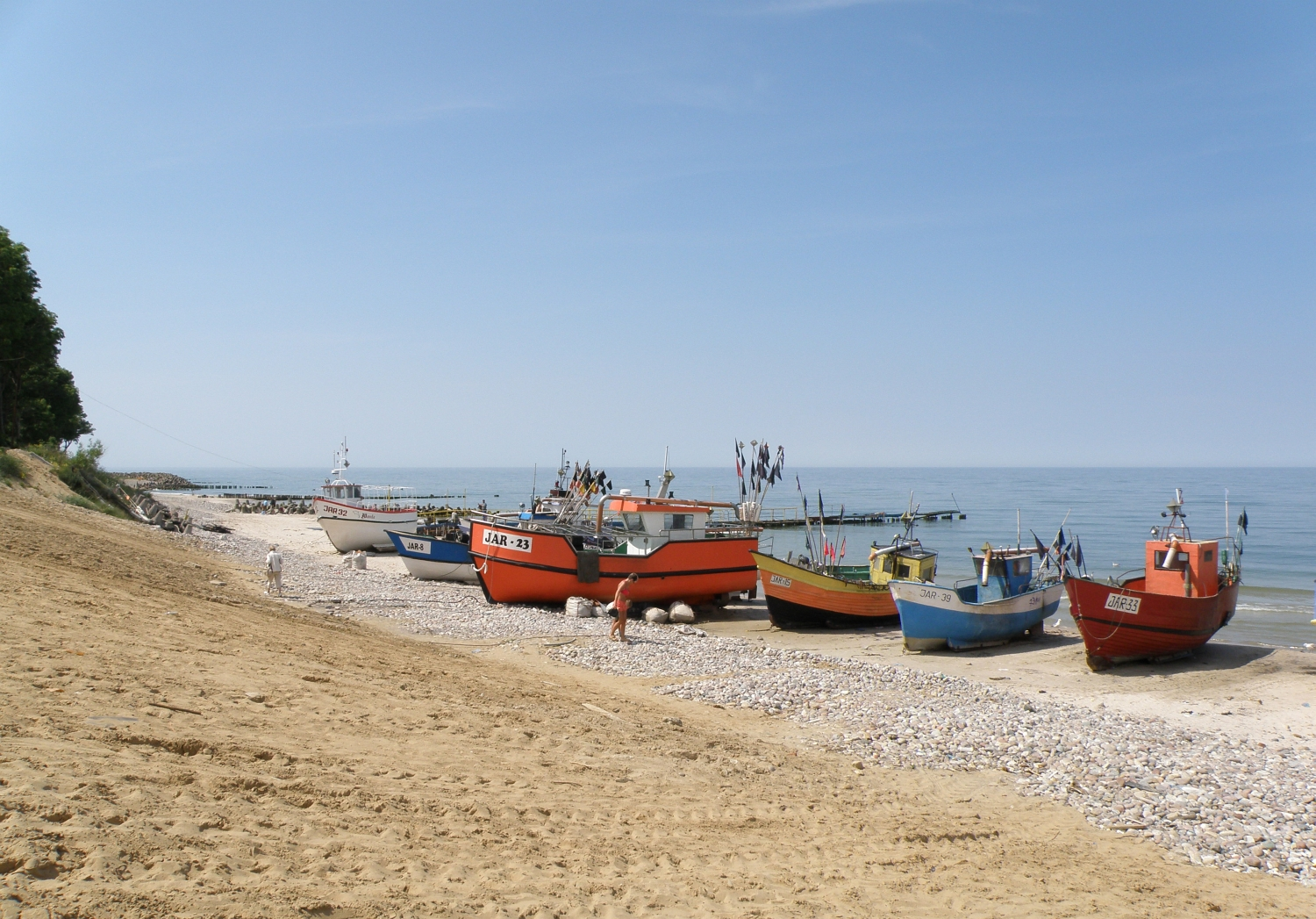
- Coast of Jarosławiec

- Flag Coat of arms

- Location within the voivodeship

- Division into gminas
- Coordinates (Sławno): 54°22′N 16°41′E
- Country: Poland
- Voivodeship: West Pomeranian
- Seat: Sławno
- Gminas: Total 6 (incl. 2 urban): Darłowo; Sławno; Gmina Darłowo; Gmina Malechowo; Gmina Postomino; Gmina Sławno

Area
  - Total: 1,043.62 km^{2} (402.94 sq mi)

Population (2006)
  - Total: 57,643
  - Density: 55.234/km^{2} (143.05/sq mi)
  - Urban: 27,694
  - Rural: 29,949
- Car plates: ZSL
- Website: www.powiatslawno.pl

Sławno County (Polish: powiat sławieński) is a unit of territorial administration and local government (powiat) in West Pomeranian Voivodeship, north-western Poland, on the Baltic coast. It came into being on January 1, 1999, as a result of the Polish local government reforms passed in 1998. Its administrative seat is the town of Sławno, which lies 174 kilometres (108 mi) north-east of the regional capital Szczecin. The only other town in the county is Darłowo, lying on the coast 19 km (12 mi) west of Sławno.

The county covers an area of 1,043.62 square kilometres (402.9 sq mi). As of 2006 its total population is 57,643, out of which the population of Darłowo is 14,380, that of Sławno is 13,314, and the rural population is 29,949.

== Neighbouring counties ==
Sławno County is bordered by Słupsk County to the east and Koszalin County to the south-west. It also borders the Baltic Sea to the north-west.

== Administrative divisions ==
The county is subdivided into six gminas (two urban and four rural). These are listed in the following table, in descending order of population.

Gmina	Type	Area (km^{2})	Population (2006)	Seat
Darłowo	urban	19.9	14,380	
Sławno	urban	15.8	13,314	
Gmina Sławno	rural	284.2	8,855	Sławno *
Gmina Darłowo	rural	269.8	7,561	Darłowo *
Gmina Postomino	rural	227.2	6,973	Postomino
Gmina Malechowo	rural	226.6	6,560	Malechowo
* seat not part of the gmina
