= Sławno =

Town in West Pomeranian Voivodeship, Poland

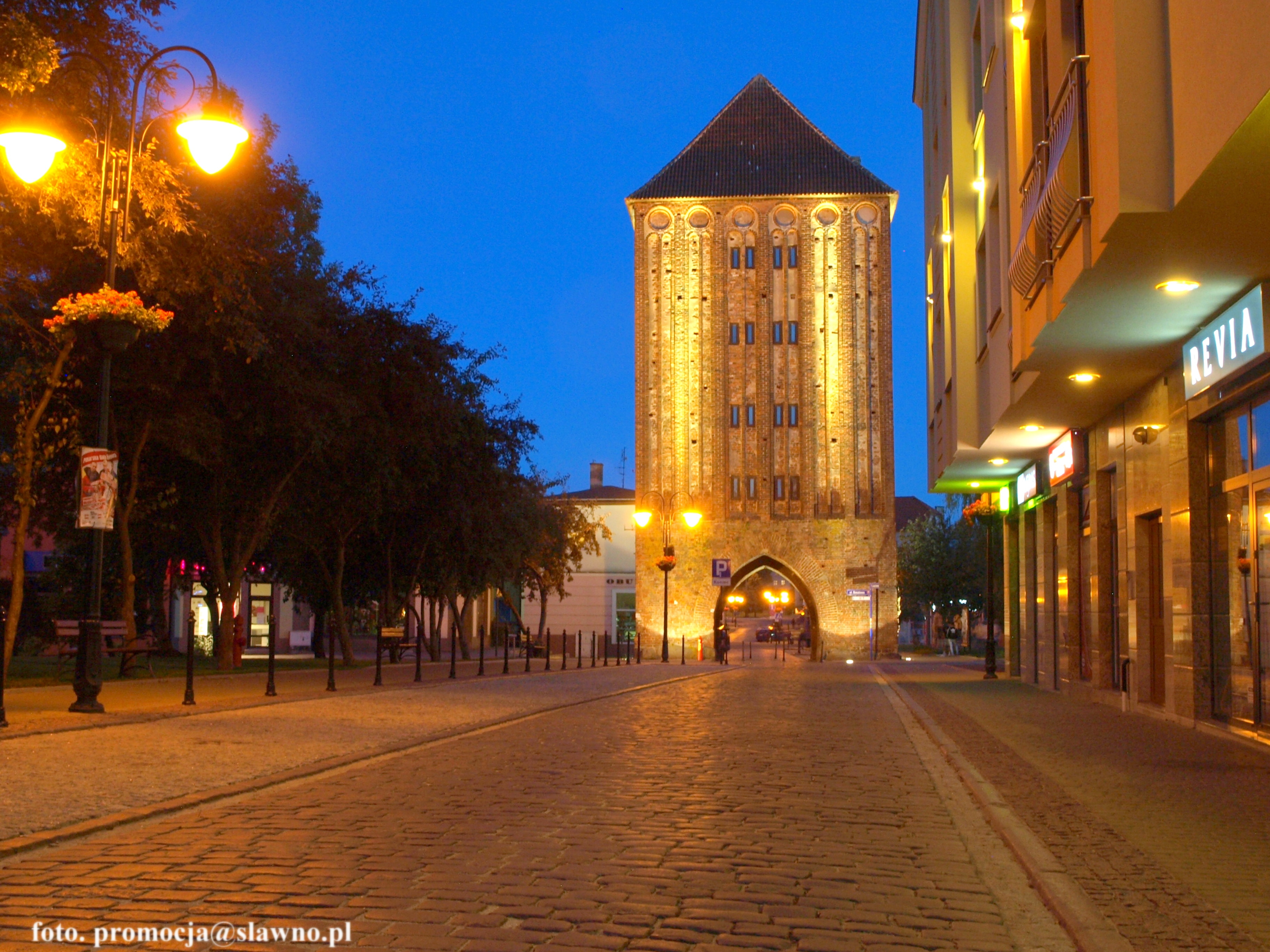
- Medieval brick gate (Brama Koszalińska)

- Coat of arms

- Location within Poland
- Coordinates: 54°22′N 16°41′E
- Country: Poland
- Voivodeship: West Pomeranian
- County: Sławno
- Gmina: Sławno (urban gmina)

Government
  - Mayor: Krzysztof Frankenstein

Area
  - Total: 15.83 km^{2} (6.11 sq mi)

Population (2019-06-30)
  - Total: 12,511
  - Density: 771.4/km^{2} (1,998/sq mi)
- Time zone: UTC+1 (CET)
  - Summer (DST): UTC+2 (CEST)
- Postal code: 76–100
- Car plates: ZSL
- Website: http://slawno.pl

Sławno [ˈswavnɔ] (Kashubian: Słôwno, German: Schlawe) is a town on the Wieprza river in Middle Pomerania region, north-western Poland, with 12,511 inhabitants (2019). It is the administrative seat of Gmina Sławno, though not part of it. The town is also the capital of Sławno County in West Pomeranian Voivodeship.

== Transport ==
The S6 expressway bypasses Sławno to the south. Three exits on the S6 expressway serve the town (exits 32, 31 and 30). Upon the opening of the S6 expressway in December 2025, national road 6 (which formerly ran through Sławno) was re-numbered to minor road 112.

Sławno is a railway junction on the major Gdańsk–Szczecin line, with access to secondary importance connections to Darłowo and Korzybie.

== History ==
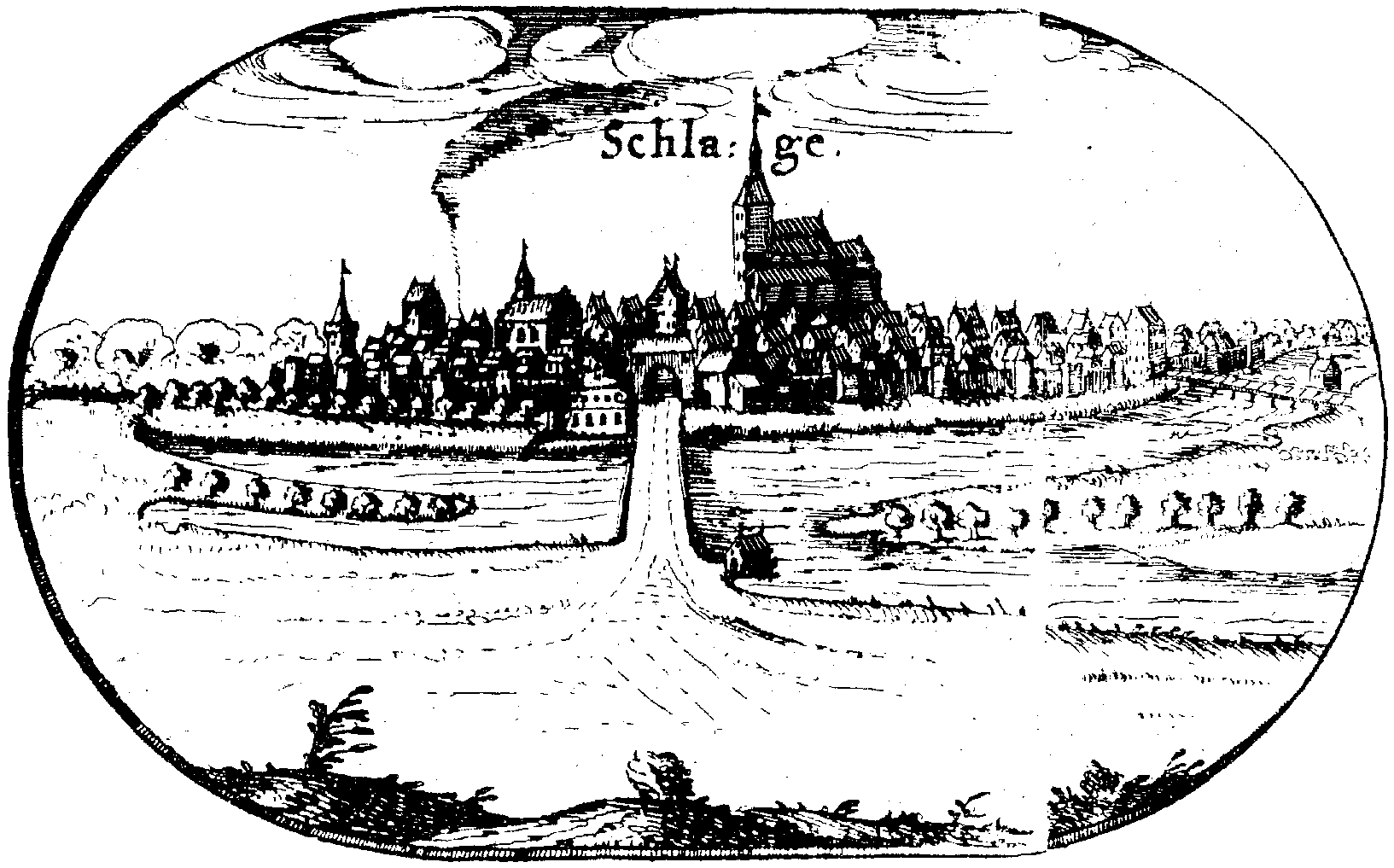
Sławno about 1618

The territory became part of the emerging Polish state under Mieszko I around 967. Since the mid-12th century the Land of Słupsk-Sławno was under the rule of Duke Ratibor I of Pomerania and his descendants, a cadet branch of the Griffin dynasty. From 1190 to 1238 it was the capital of a small eponymous duchy. When the line became extinct about 1227, their estates were the matter of an inheritance conflict between the Griffin Duke Barnim I the Good and Swietopelk II from the Samborid dynasty, who ruled over the adjacent territories of Pomerelia (Gdańsk Pomerania) in the east. Both duchies had previously separated from Poland as a result of the 12th-century fragmentation of Poland (Pomerania in the 12th century, and Pomerelia in the 13th century).

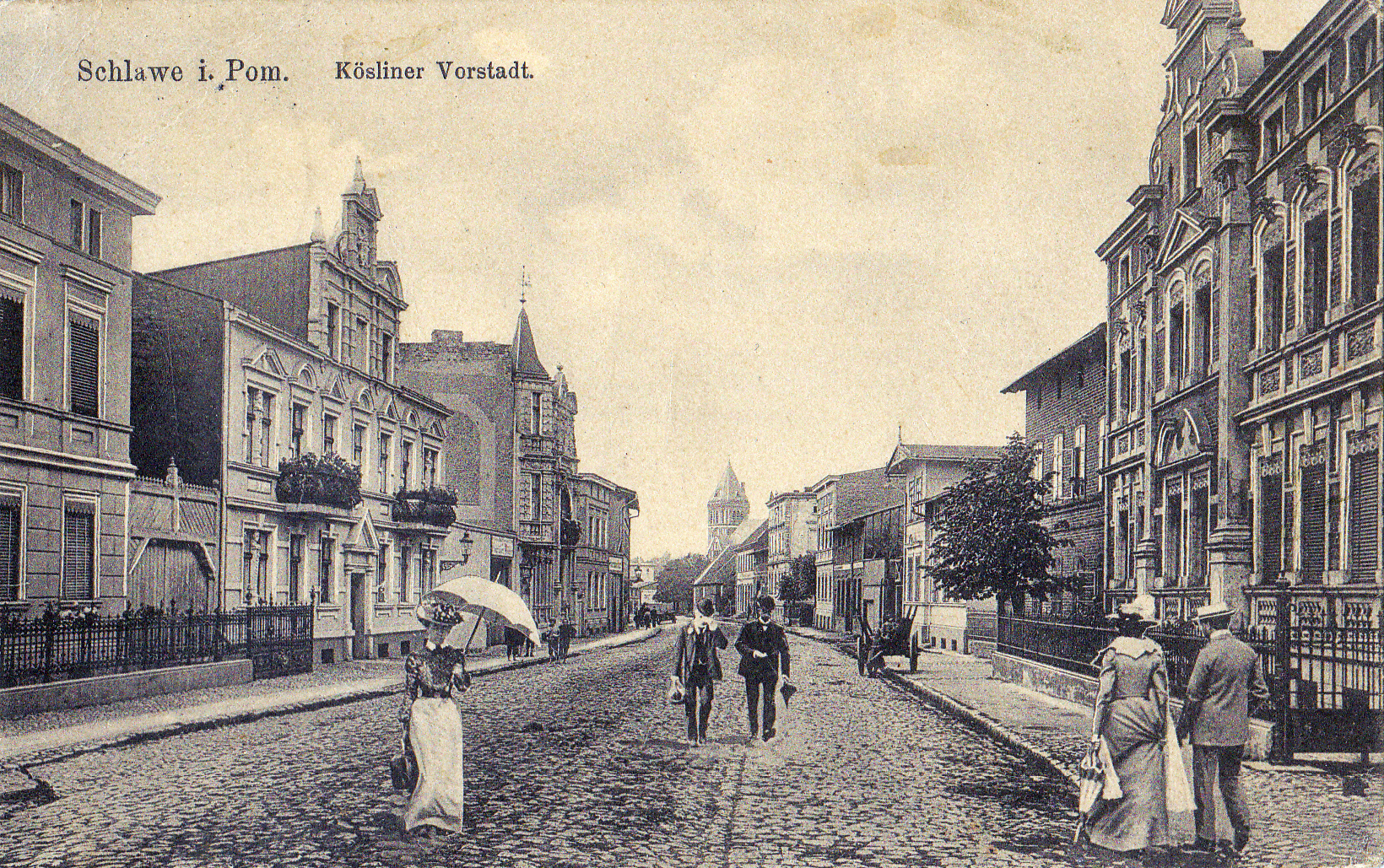
Koszalińska Street, postcard from 1912

Swietopelk II prevailed, his son Mestwin II, duke in Pomerelia from 1266, however again had to deal with claims raised by the Pomeranian Griffins and also by his brother Wratislaw II. To secure his rule, Mestwin accepted the suzerainty of the Ascanian margraves of Brandenburg by the 1269 Treaty of Arnswalde, but later on, in 1282, Mestwin and Polish Duke Przemysł II signed the Treaty of Kępno, which transferred the suzerainty over Gdańsk Pomerania including Sławno to Przemysł II. Upon Mestwin's death in 1294, the Samborides became extinct and Sławno was reintegrated with Poland. In 1308 Brandenburg invaded the region and Waldemar of Ascania finally separated Sławno from Pomerelia, which he sold to the Teutonic Order by the 1309 Treaty of Soldin. He nevertheless lost the town to the Griffin duke Wartislaw IV of Pomerania in 1317, whereafter Sławno remained a part of the Griffin-ruled Pomeranian duchies until 1637.

Duke Wartislaw IV enfeoffed Peter von Neuenburg of the Swienca noble family with Sławno, who granted the settlement town rights in 1317. The Gothic St Mary's Church was consecrated about 1360. Between 1368 and 1478 Sławno was under the rule of dukes of Słupsk, vassals of the Kingdom of Poland. Later on it was part of the Duchy of Pomerania, until its partition in the 17th century between Sweden and Brandenburg-Prussia. Devastated throughout the Thirty Years' War, the town was allotted to the Brandenburg Province of Pomerania by the 1653 Treaty of Stettin.

During World War II, the Polish resistance was active, and Polish underground press was distributed in the town. Sławno suffered heavy destruction during the war. With the defeat of Nazi Germany in 1945, its German population was expelled in accordance with the Potsdam Agreement and it was handed over back to Poland.

From 1975 to 1998, it was administratively located in the Słupsk Voivodeship.

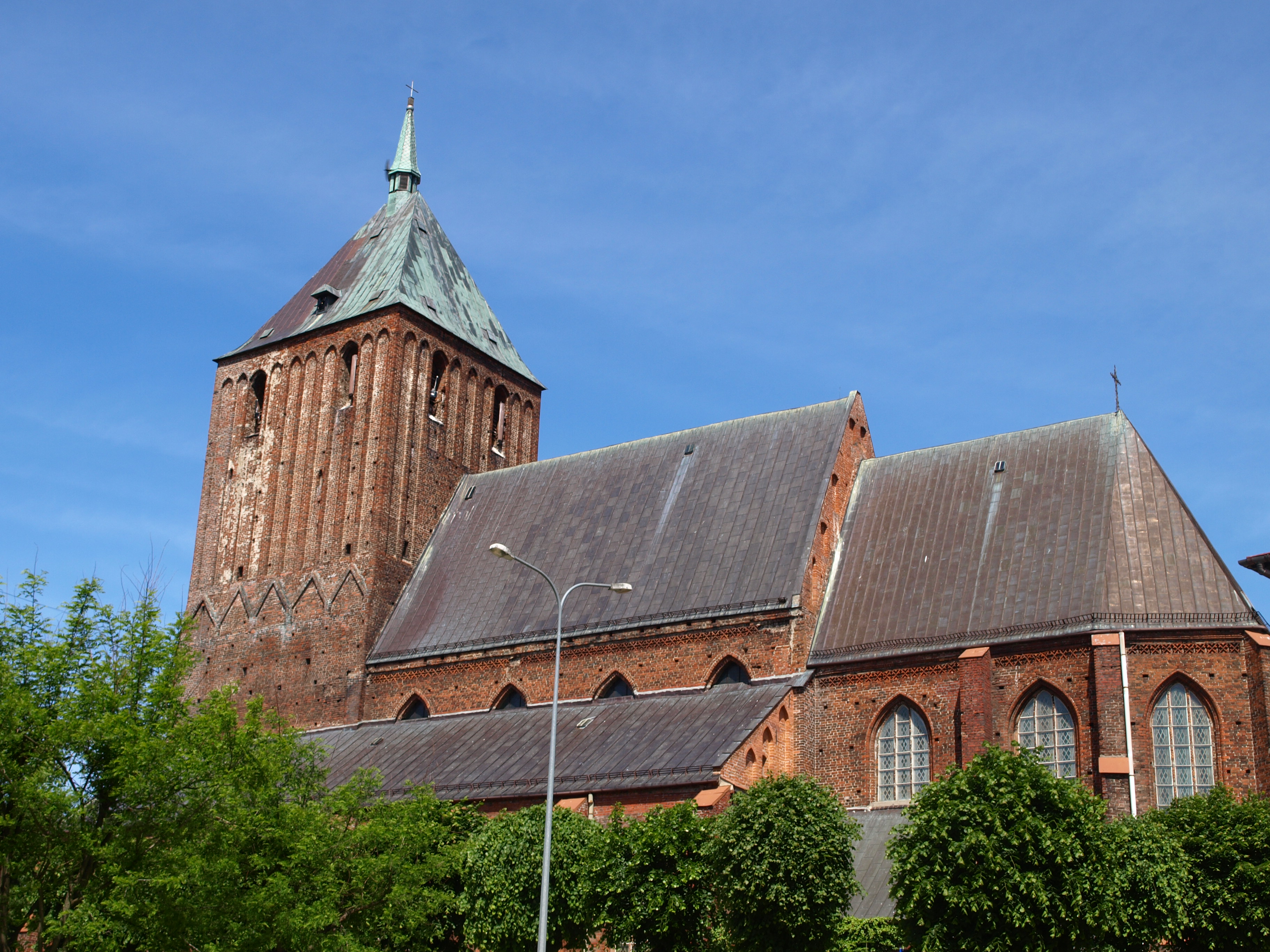
Church of the Assumption of Mary

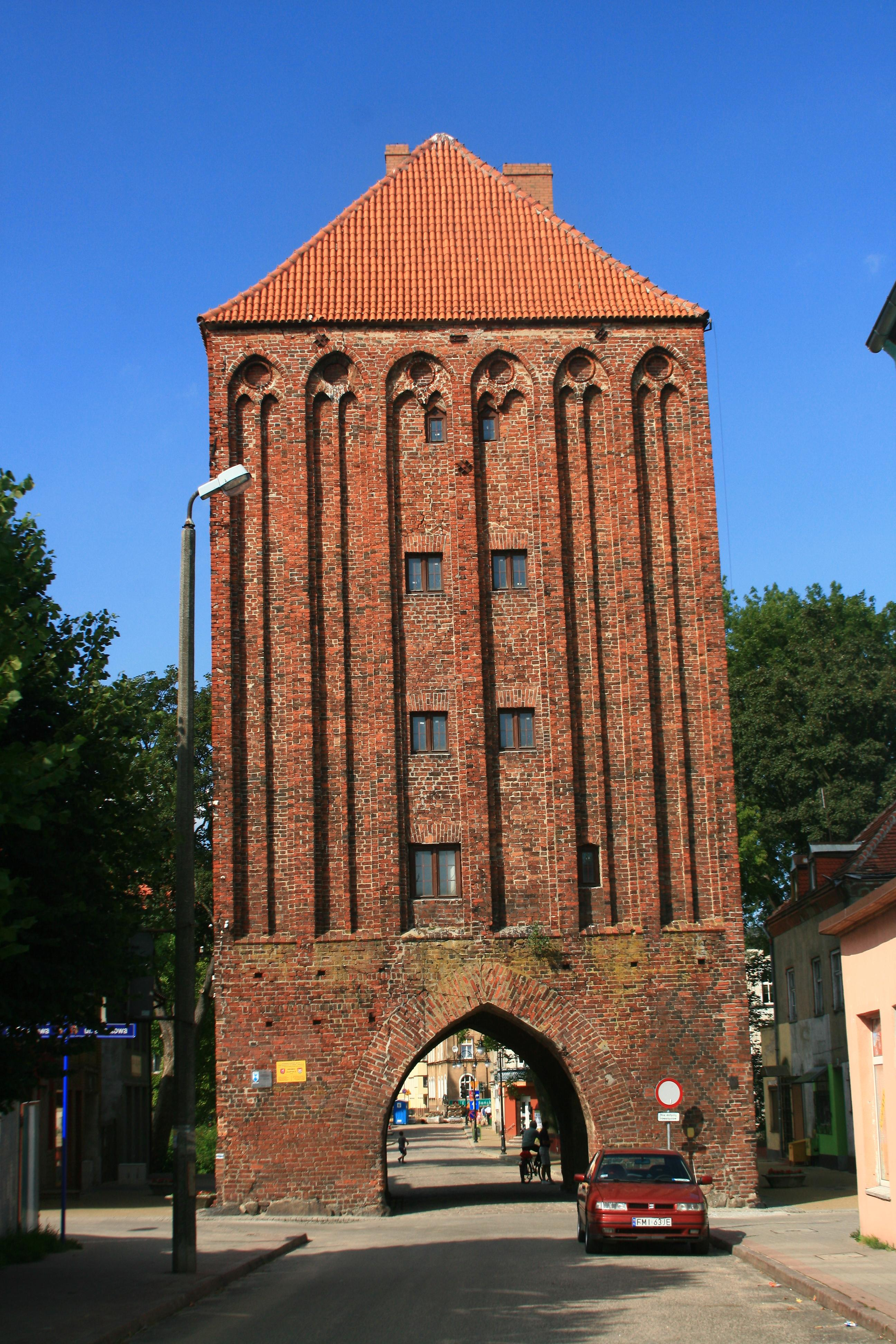
Słupsk Gate

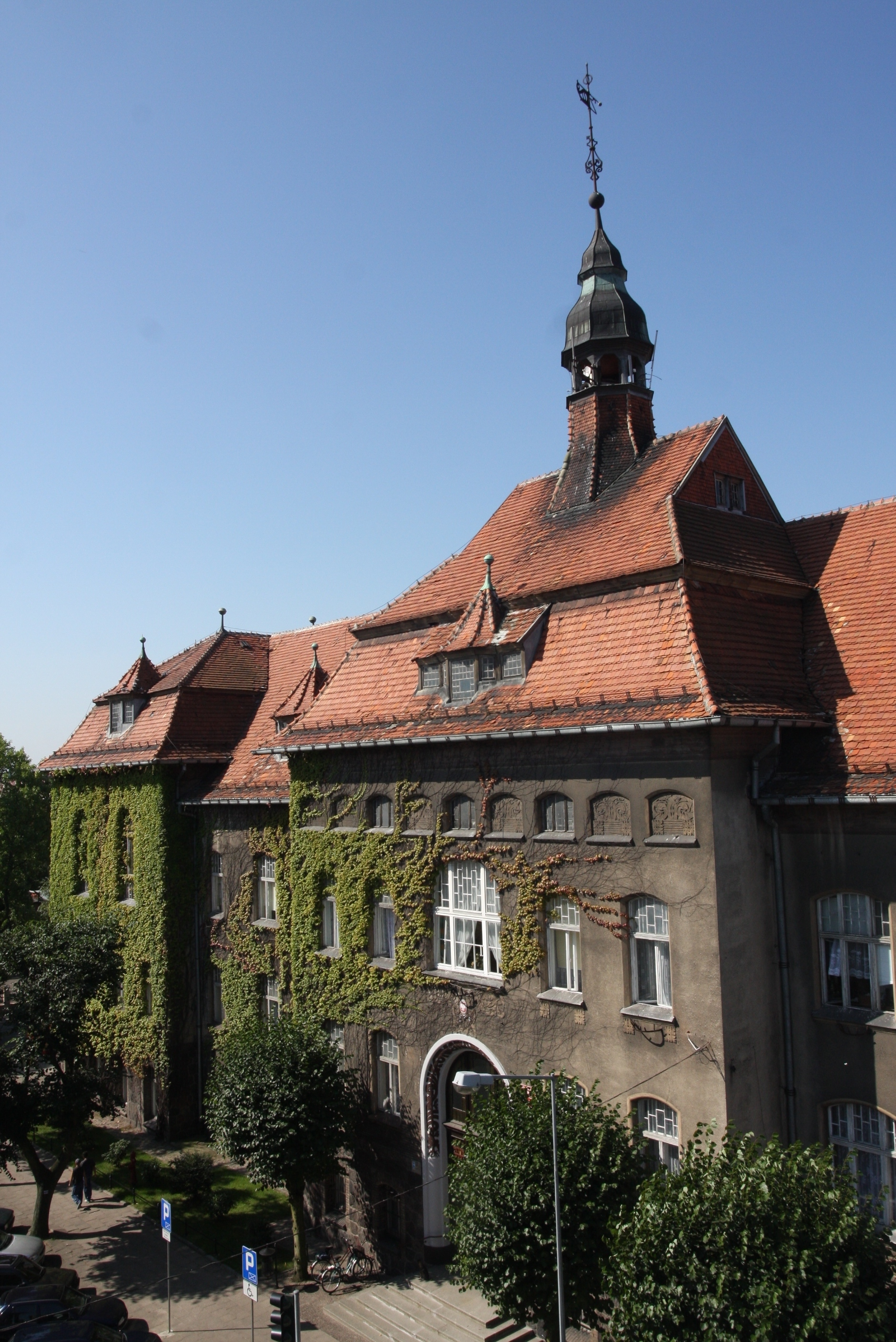
Town Hall

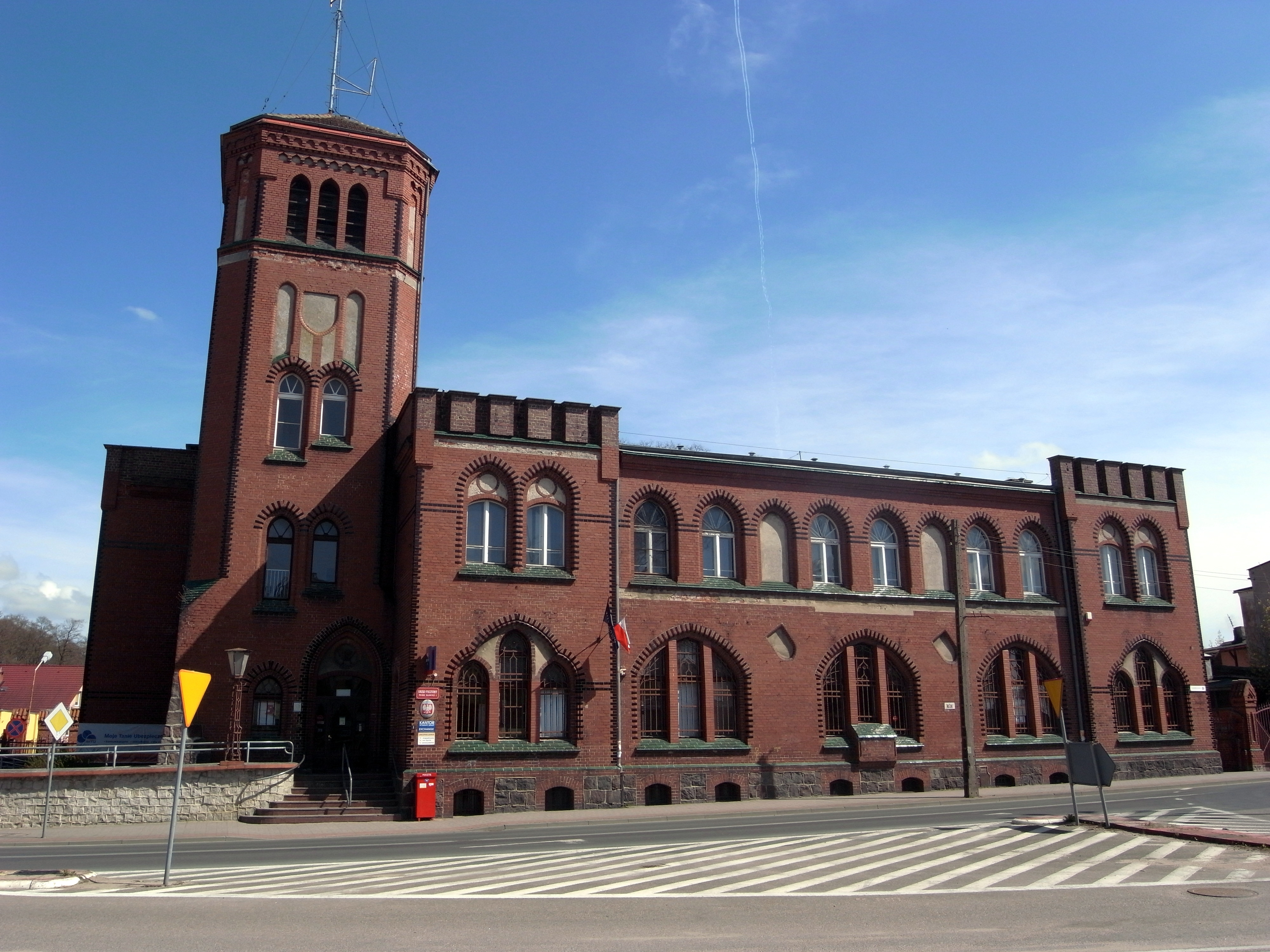
Post office

== Population ==
- 1791: 1,682 inhabitants
- 1852: 4,382 inhabitants
- 1875: 5,141 inhabitants
- 1910: 6,620 inhabitants
- 1939: 9,746 inhabitants
- 1947: 4,800 inhabitants (estimated)
- 1960: 8,600 inhabitants
- 1970: 10,800 inhabitants
- 1975: 11,500 inhabitants
- 1980: 12,700 inhabitants
- 2002: 15,000 inhabitants
- 2019: 12,511 inhabitants

== Notable people ==
- Franz Mehring (1846–1919), German journalist, Communist and a Revolutionary Socialist
- Hans-Martin Majewski (1911–1997), German composer of film scores
- Erica Wallach (1923–1994), American-German political activist and teacher
- Arwed Imiela (1929–1982), German serial killer
- Otto Mellies (1931-2020), German actor
- Wolfgang Weber (born 1944), German footballer
- Marcin Wasilewski (born 1975), Polish pianist and composer
- Agnieszka Włodarczyk (born 1980), Polish actress and singer

== Twin towns – sister cities ==
Sławno is twinned with:

- Cles, Italy
- Ribnitz-Damgarten, Germany
- Rinteln, Germany
- Ząbkowice Śląskie, Poland

Sławno is also a partner city with:

- Trento, Italy
