= Wierzbka Górna =

- Settlement
- Location within Poland
- Coordinates: 53°59′N 15°38′E
- Country: Poland
- Voivodeship: West Pomeranian
- County: Kołobrzeg
- Gmina: Gościno

Wierzbka Górna [ˈvjɛʂpka ˈɡurna] (German: Klein Vorbeck) is a settlement in the administrative district of Gmina Gościno, within Kołobrzeg County, West Pomeranian Voivodeship, in north-western Poland. It lies approximately 8 km (5 mi) south of Gościno, 21 km (13 mi) south of Kołobrzeg, and 94 km (58 mi) north-east of the regional capital Szczecin.
