= Ząbrowo =

Ząbrowo may refer to the following places:

- Ząbrowo, Pomeranian Voivodeship (north Poland)
- Ząbrowo, Warmian-Masurian Voivodeship (north Poland)
- Ząbrowo, Kołobrzeg County in West Pomeranian Voivodeship (north-west Poland)
- Ząbrowo, Świdwin County in West Pomeranian Voivodeship (north-west Poland)
