= Skronie =

- Village
- Location within Poland
- Coordinates: 54°3′15″N 15°42′25″E
- Country: Poland
- Voivodeship: West Pomeranian
- County: Kołobrzeg
- Gmina: Gościno

Skronie [ˈskrɔɲɛ] (German: Krühne) is a village in the administrative district of Gmina Gościno, within Kołobrzeg County, West Pomeranian Voivodeship, in north-western Poland. It lies approximately 16 km (10 mi) south-east of Kołobrzeg and 103 km (64 mi) north-east of the regional capital Szczecin.
