= Ołużna =

- Village
- Location within Poland
- Coordinates: 54°4′N 15°36′E
- Country: Poland
- Voivodeship: West Pomeranian
- County: Kołobrzeg
- Gmina: Gościno

Ołużna [ɔˈwuʐna] (German: Seefeld) is a village in the administrative district of Gmina Gościno, within Kołobrzeg County, West Pomeranian Voivodeship, in north-western Poland. It lies approximately 12 km (7 mi) south of Kołobrzeg and 99 km (62 mi) north-east of the regional capital Szczecin.
