= Wierzbka Dolna =

- Settlement
- Location within Poland
- Coordinates: 53°59′2″N 15°38′48″E
- Country: Poland
- Voivodeship: West Pomeranian
- County: Kołobrzeg
- Gmina: Gościno

Wierzbka Dolna [ˈvjɛʂpka ˈdɔlna] (German: Groß Vorbeck) is a settlement in the administrative district of Gmina Gościno, within Kołobrzeg County, West Pomeranian Voivodeship, in north-western Poland.
