= Gościno-Dwór =

- Village
- Location within Poland
- Coordinates: 54°2′20″N 15°40′17″E
- Country: Poland
- Voivodeship: West Pomeranian
- County: Kołobrzeg
- Gmina: Gościno
- Population: 130

Gościno-Dwór (Polish: [ɡɔɕˈt͡ɕinɔ ˈdvur]; German: Gut Groß Jestin) is a village in the administrative district of Gmina Gościno, within Kołobrzeg County, West Pomeranian Voivodeship, in north-western Poland. It lies approximately 16 km (10 mi) south-east of Kołobrzeg and 100 km (62 mi) north-east of the regional capital Szczecin.

The village has a population of 130.
