= Jarogniew, West Pomeranian Voivodeship =

Jarogniew
- Settlement
- Location within Poland
- Coordinates: 54°4′15″N 15°38′15″E
- Country: Poland
- Voivodeship: West Pomeranian
- County: Kołobrzeg
- Gmina: Gościno

Jarogniew [jaˈrɔɡɲɛf] (German: Karlshof) is a settlement in the administrative district of Gmina Gościno, within Kołobrzeg County, West Pomeranian Voivodeship, in north-western Poland.
