= Ramlewo =

- Village
- Location within Poland
- Coordinates: 53°58′45″N 15°43′1″E
- Country: Poland
- Voivodeship: West Pomeranian
- County: Kołobrzeg
- Gmina: Gościno

Ramlewo [ramˈlɛvɔ] (German: Ramelow) is a village in the administrative district of Gmina Gościno, within Kołobrzeg County, West Pomeranian Voivodeship, in north-western Poland. It lies approximately 24 km (15 mi) south-east of Kołobrzeg and 98 km (61 mi) north-east of the regional capital Szczecin.
