= Myślino =

- Village
- Location within Poland
- Coordinates: 54°1′44″N 15°41′46″E
- Country: Poland
- Voivodeship: West Pomeranian
- County: Kołobrzeg
- Gmina: Gościno
- Population: 142

Myślino [mɨˈɕlinɔ] (German: Moitzlin) is a village in the administrative district of Gmina Gościno, within Kołobrzeg County, West Pomeranian Voivodeship, in north-western Poland.

Myślino is approximately 18 km (11 mi) south-east of Kołobrzeg and 100 km (62 mi) north-east of the regional capital Szczecin.

The village has a population of 142.
