= Lubkowice =

- Settlement
- Location within Poland
- Coordinates: 54°3′31″N 15°39′23″E
- Country: Poland
- Voivodeship: West Pomeranian
- County: Kołobrzeg
- Gmina: Gościno
- Population: 160

Lubkowice [lupkɔˈvit͡sɛ] (German: Johannisberg) is a settlement in the administrative district of Gmina Gościno, within Kołobrzeg County, West Pomeranian Voivodeship, in north-western Poland. It lies approximately 14 km (9 mi) south-east of Kołobrzeg and 101 km (63 mi) north-east of the regional capital Szczecin.

The settlement has a population of 160.
