= Mołtowo =

- Village
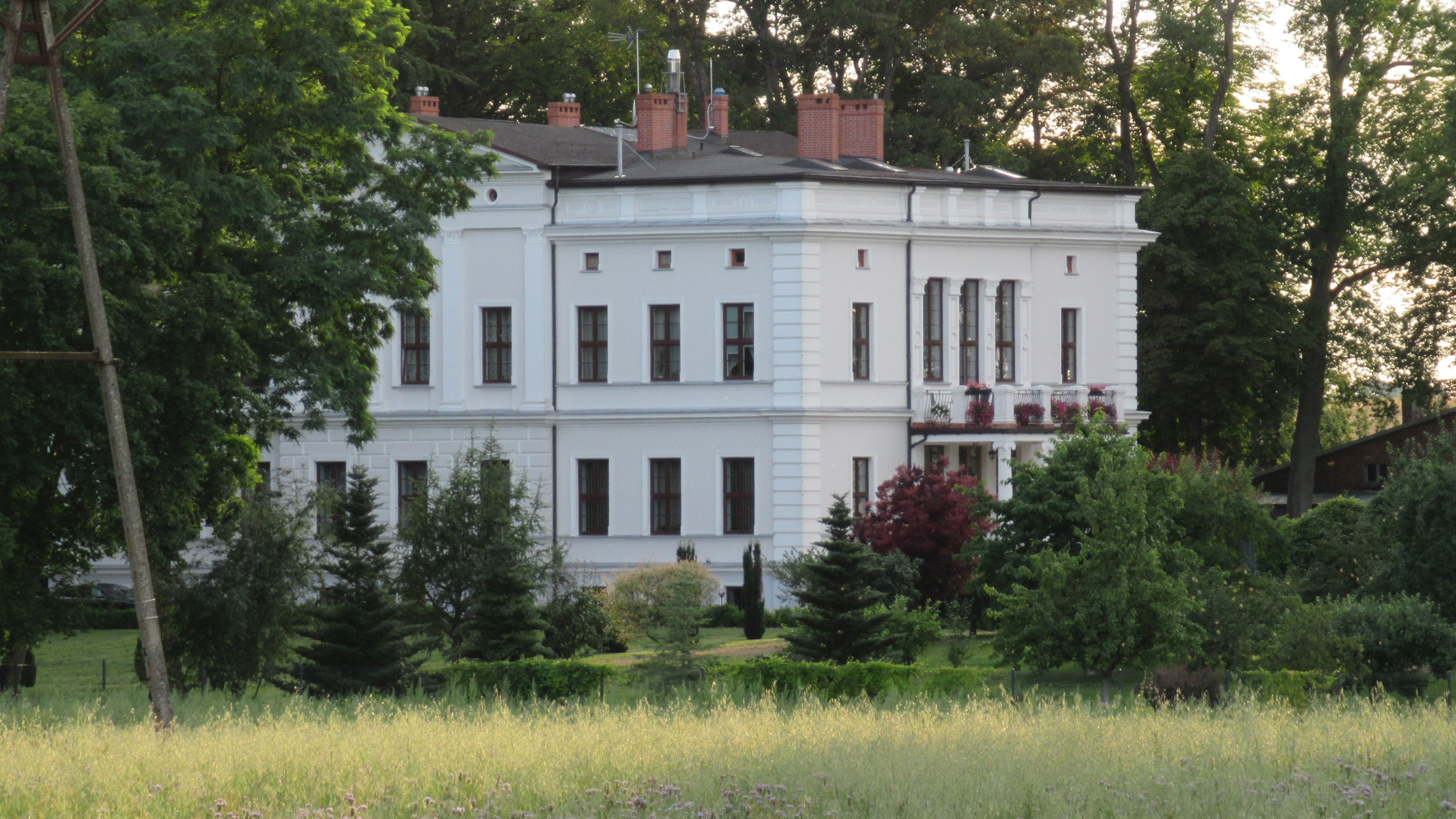
- Mołtowo Palace

- Location within Poland
- Coordinates: 54°3′N 15°41′E
- Country: Poland
- Voivodeship: West Pomeranian
- County: Kołobrzeg
- Gmina: Gościno

Population
  - Total: 158
- Time zone: UTC+1 (CET)
  - Summer (DST): UTC+2 (CEST)
- Vehicle registration: ZKL
- Website: http://moltowo.most.org.pl

Mołtowo [mɔu̯ˈtɔvɔ] is a village in the administrative district of Gmina Gościno, within Kołobrzeg County, West Pomeranian Voivodeship, in north-western Poland. It lies approximately 16 km (10 mi) south-east of Kołobrzeg and 101 km (63 mi) north-east of the regional capital Szczecin.

The village has a population of 158.
