= Wartkowo =

- Village
- Location within Poland
- Coordinates: 53°59′58″N 15°40′46″E
- Country: Poland
- Voivodeship: West Pomeranian
- County: Kołobrzeg
- Gmina: Gościno

Wartkowo [vartˈkɔvɔ] (German: Wartekow) is a village in the administrative district of Gmina Gościno, within Kołobrzeg County, West Pomeranian Voivodeship, in north-western Poland. It lies approximately 20 km (12 mi) south of Kołobrzeg and 97 km (60 mi) north-east of the regional capital Szczecin.
