= Sikorzyce, West Pomeranian Voivodeship =

Sikorzyce
- Settlement
- Location within Poland
- Coordinates: 53°57′39″N 15°42′28″E
- Country: Poland
- Voivodeship: West Pomeranian
- County: Kołobrzeg
- Gmina: Gościno

Sikorzyce ([ɕikɔˈʐɨt͡sɛ]; German: Meisegau) is a settlement in the administrative district of Gmina Gościno, within Kołobrzeg County, West Pomeranian Voivodeship, in north-western Poland.
