= Dargocice =

- Village
- Location within Poland
- Coordinates: 53°59′51″N 15°38′33″E
- Country: Poland
- Voivodeship: West Pomeranian
- County: Kołobrzeg
- Gmina: Gościno

Dargocice [darɡɔˈt͡ɕit͡sɛ] (German: Eickstedtswalde) is a village in the administrative district of Gmina Gościno, within Kołobrzeg County, West Pomeranian Voivodeship, in north-western Poland. It lies approximately 20 km (12 mi) south of Kołobrzeg and 95 km (59 mi) north-east of the regional capital Szczecin.
