= Tunnel 57 =

Tunnel under the Berlin Wall

Coordinates: 52°32′10.62″N 13°23′33.79″E

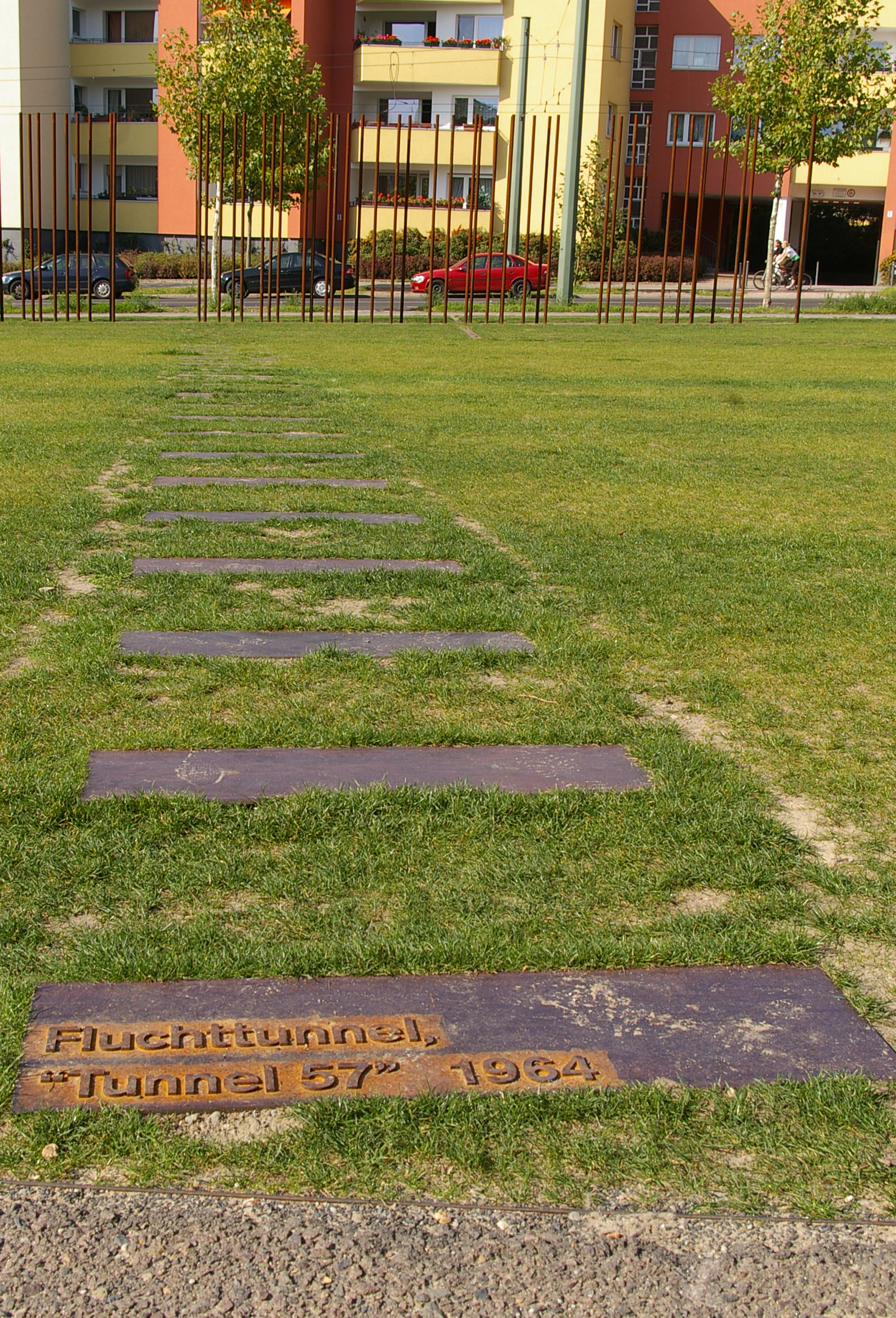
Location marker on the Berlin Wall Memorial, with the Bernauer Straße in the background

Tunnel 57 was a tunnel under the Berlin Wall that on 3 and 4 October 1964 was the location of a mass escape by 57 East Berlin citizens to West Berlin. It was built from the basement of an empty bakery at 97 Bernauer Straße in West Berlin, under the Berlin Wall – which at that time and place consisted of empty, bricked-up apartment buildings on the east side of Bernauer Straße – all the way to a disused outhouse in the rear courtyard at 55 Strelitzer Straße in East Berlin. At a depth of 12 meters (39 ft) and a length of 145 meters (476 ft), Tunnel 57 was the longest, deepest and most expensive flight tunnel built in Berlin. Thirty-five West Berliners, including Wolfgang Fuchs, the future astronaut Reinhard Furrer, and many students from the Freie University in West Berlin, helped to build the tunnel from April to October 1964, until on 3 and 4 October 57 people fled the GDR via the tunnel.

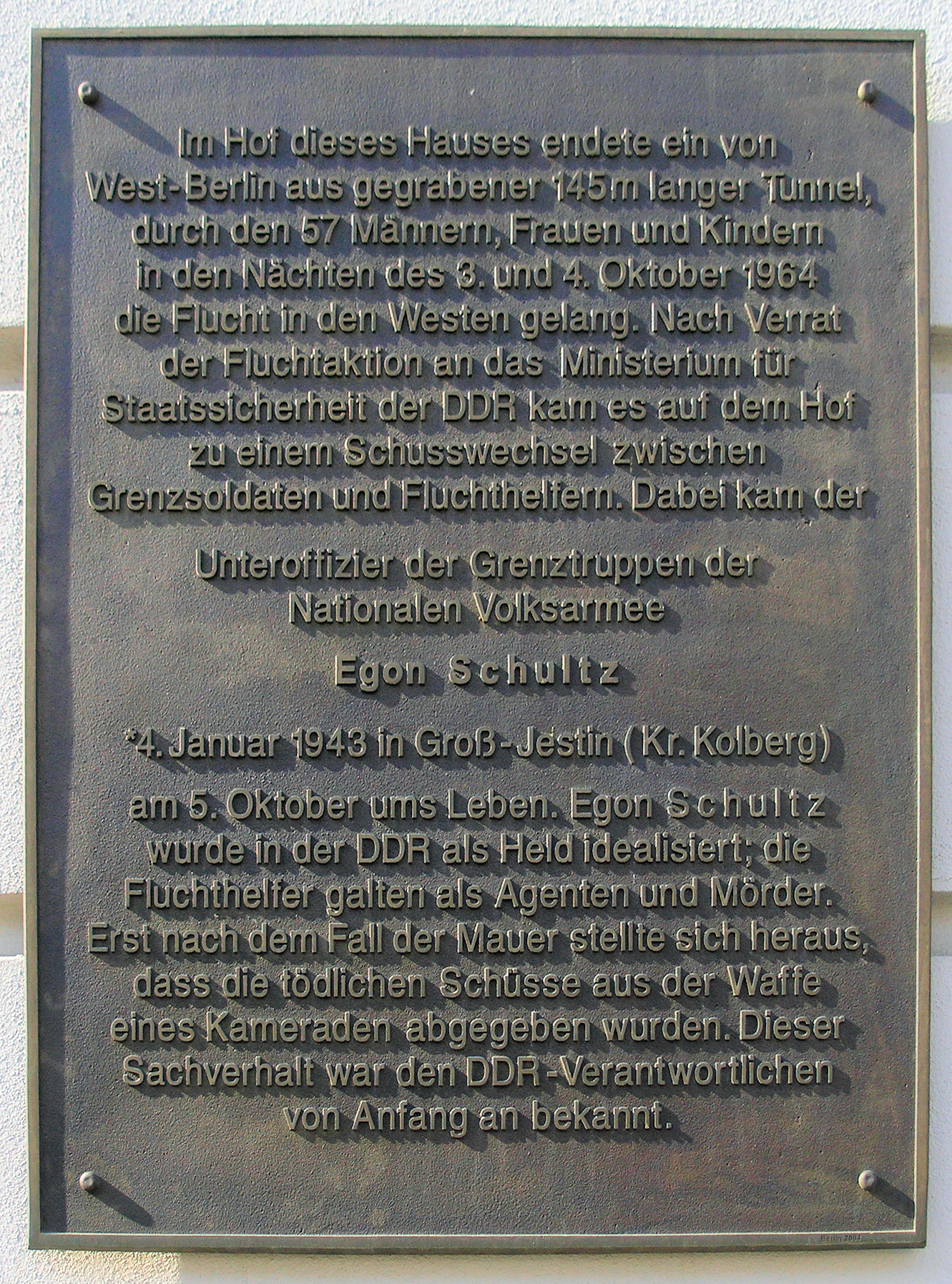
Commemorative plaque on the house at Strelitzer Straße 55, in Berlin-Mitte

== History ==
Some of the organisers of the tunnel – the so-called couriers – had made contact with 120 people in East Berlin and planned for their escape. These couriers would bring them to the apartment building at 55 Strelitzer Straße and into the courtyard, where Reinhard Furrer would show them to the tunnel entrance in the disused outhouse. Amongst those 120 people who were planned to escape was a collaborator with the Stasi, the East German secret police. On 4 October around midnight, the second night of fleeing, two Stasi officers in plain clothes presented at the entrance, claiming they wanted to flee, and had another friend they wanted to fetch to come as well. When they returned not with a friend but with border guards, one of the helpers, Christian Zobel, shot at the guards, hitting Egon Schultz on the shoulder. He fell to the ground, and, while trying to get up again, was fatally shot by friendly fire from one of his fellow officers.

Seeking to use the incident for propaganda, the East Berlin press reported on the following day that "West Berlin terrorists" had murdered a border guard. The SED, the GDR's dictatorial ruling communist party, spread this rumor and made a martyr out of Schultz, the victim of a ruthless enemy of the border [Grenzverletzer]. Only after German reunification could the exact events be recreated using the Stasi's records from the time. Zobel wrongly believed that he had fatally shot Schultz right up until his death in the 1980s.

A memorial plaque on the site today commemorates both the successful escape and Schultz's death as a victim of the Berlin Wall.

Tunnel 57 caught the attention of the western press too. The German news magazine Stern reported about the tunnel, though they distanced themselves from the events, despite having helped finance the tunnel. The builders of the tunnel went different ways. Most stayed away from risky flight operations, with Reinhard Furrer continuing his physics degree at the Freie University and going on to become an astronaut. Wolfgang Fuchs and Hasso Herschel continued to help people to flee from the GDR.

The tunnel was partly financed by selling the rights to film and photograph the tunnel to several German and international press and news agencies. The largest single contribution of about 30,000 Deutschmarks came from the West German Federal Ministry of Intra-German Relations.

== See also ==
- Liste der Fluchttunnel in Berlin während der deutschen Teilung
- Berlin Wall
