= Egon Schultz =

East German border guard (1943–1964)

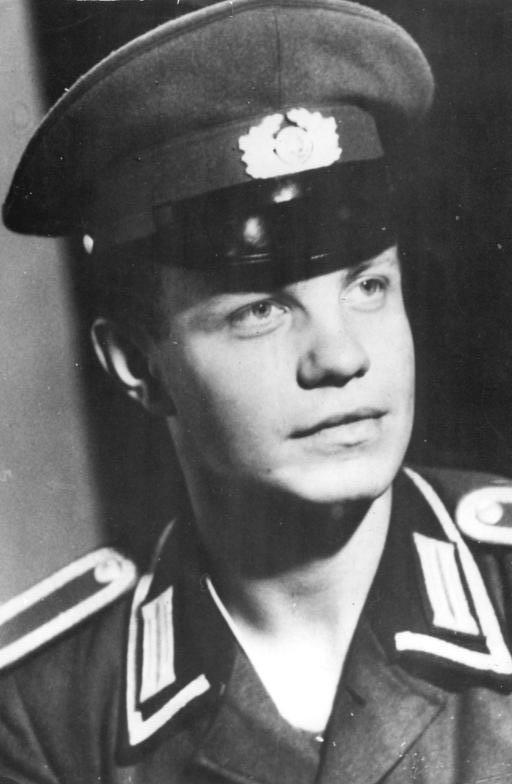
- Born: 4 January 1943; Groß Jestin, Nazi Germany
- Died: 5 October 1964 (aged 21); East Berlin, East Germany
- Cause of death: Gunshot wound (friendly fire)
- Body discovered: Courtyard of Strelitzer Straße 55; 52.536007°N 13.394029°E
- Resting place: Neuer Friedhof, Rostock; 54.07086°N 12.091269°E
- Monuments: Memorial plaque on the side of the building at Strelitzer Straße 55, Berlin
- Known for: Killed in the line of duty as an East German Border Troops while responding to the discovery of "Tunnel 57"
- Political party: (Candidate for the) Socialist Unity Party of Germany (Sozialistische Einheitspartei Deutschlands, SED).

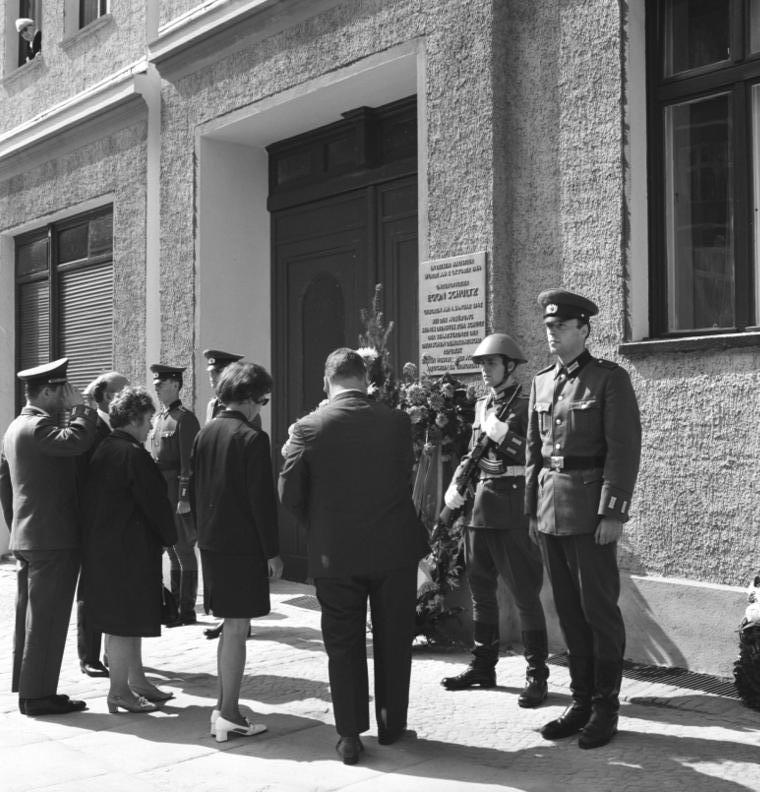
Memorial service at the scene of Egon Schultz's death, on the tenth anniversary of the Wall (13 August 1971)

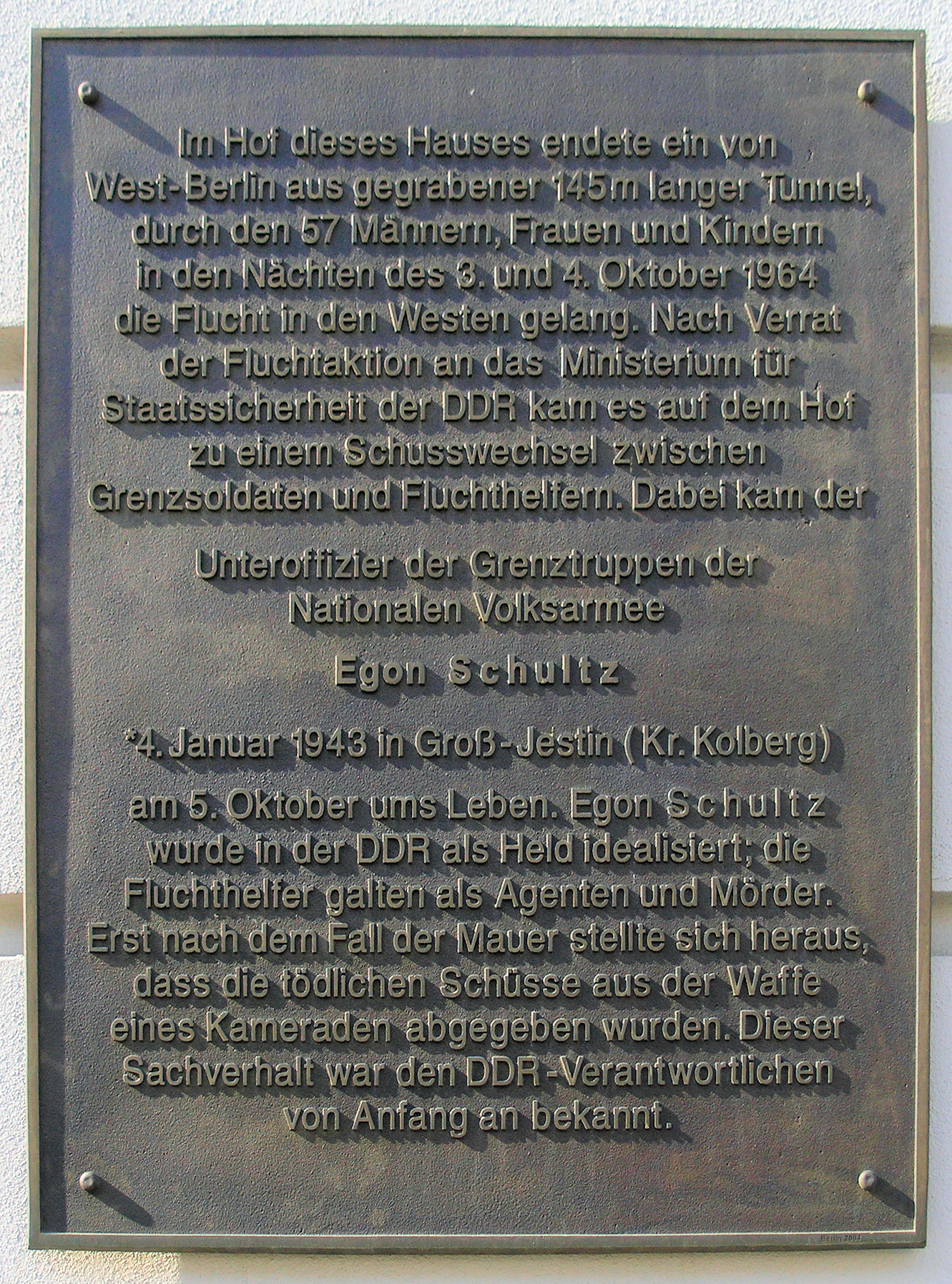
Memorial plaque at Strelitzer Straße 55, Berlin-Mitte

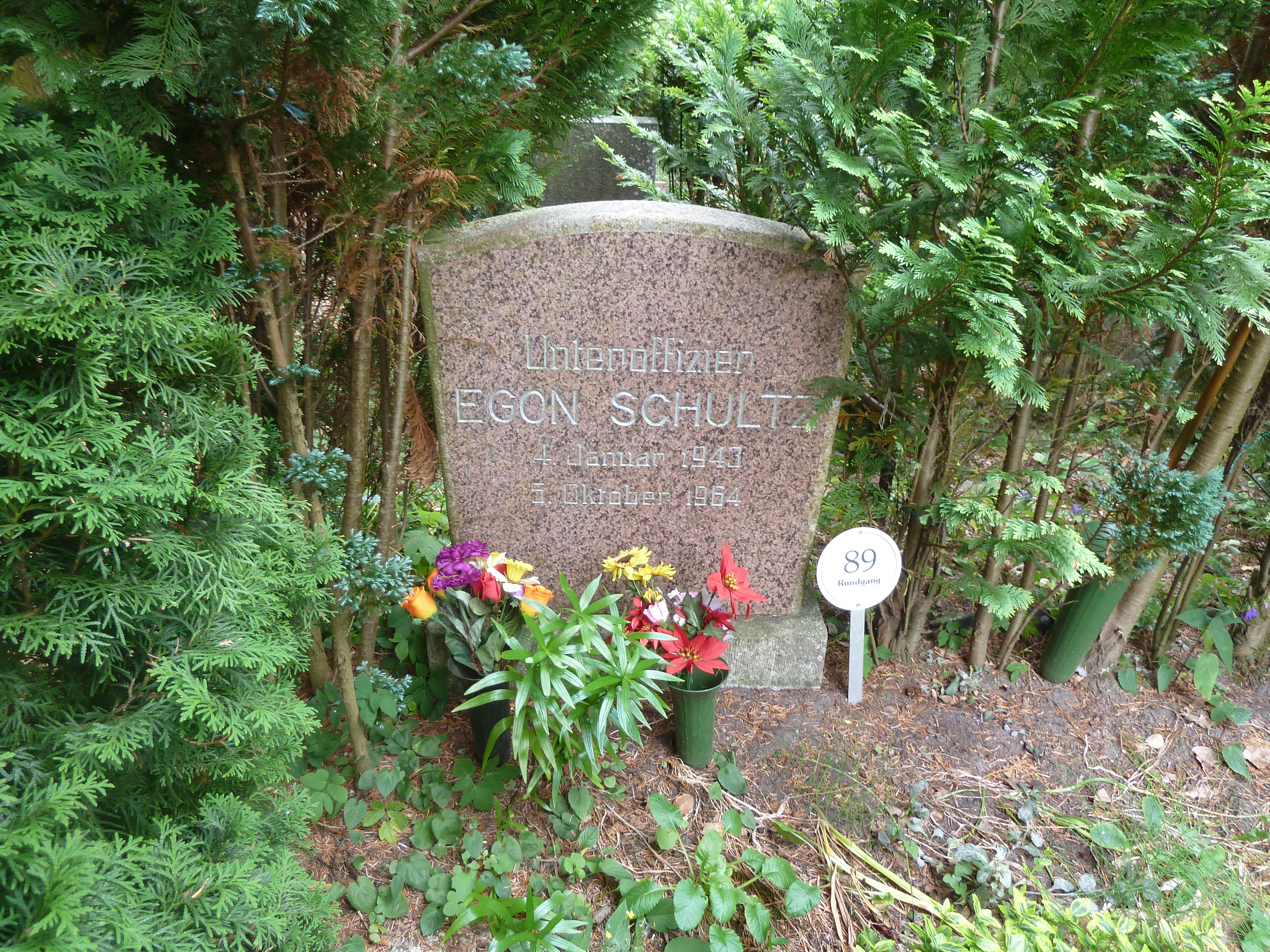
The grave of Egon Schultz (2018 photo)

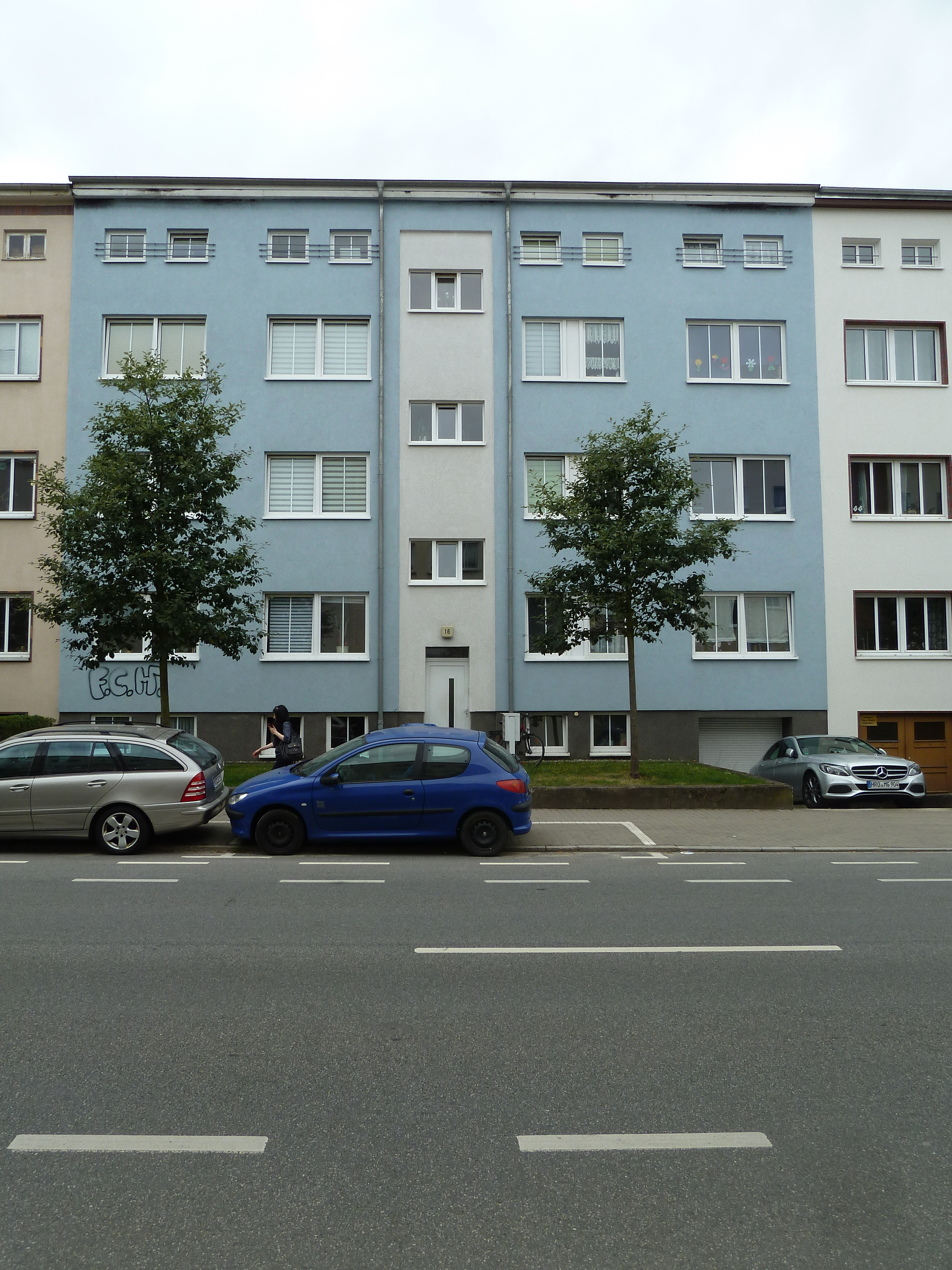
Dethardingstraße 16 (formerly Karl-Marx-Straße 16), Rostock. Last home of Egon Schultz before his death.

Egon Schultz (4 January 1943 – 5 October 1964) was a German sergeant of the East German Border Troops who became the fifty-second known person to die at the Berlin Wall. While responding to the discovery of "Tunnel 57," Schultz was killed during a shootout with the tunnelers. Schultz subsequently became a national hero in East Germany, with hundreds of memorials and schools named in his honor. His death caused a public sensation in both East Germany and West Germany. Following the reunification of Germany and the report that Schultz was actually killed as a result of friendly fire, many of the memorials to Schultz were removed, although a new memorial plaque was erected at his death site at Strelitzer Strasse 55, Berlin, in 2004.

== Biography ==
Egon Schultz was born on 4 January 1943, in Groß Jestin, in Kolberg-Körlin county, Pomerania, Germany (now Gościno, Kołobrzeg County, West Pomeranian Voivodeship, Poland), the second of two sons of Alfred Schultz, a truck driver, and his wife Frieda, a waitress. Schultz trained as a school teacher in Putbus and at 19 years old began working as a teacher in Dierkow near Rostock in September 1962, but shortly after beginning his teaching career it would be interrupted with his conscription to the National People's Army. His older brother, Armin, was a painter, and at the time of Schultz's conscription the family resided at Karl-Marx-Straße 16 in Rostock. His final visit home, just days prior to his death, was at the same time that his parents were celebrating their 25th wedding anniversary. By the time of his death, Schultz was two years into his three-year service, and had become a sergeant of the Border Troops of the German Democratic Republic, the border guards of East Germany that guarded the Berlin Wall which had been erected 3 years earlier.

== Death ==
On 4 October 1964, Schultz was assigned as a reserve to the command post at Arkonaplatz in Berlin-Mitte, East Berlin. Shortly before midnight, a Stasi officer demanded backup support from the border guards, who were to investigate and arrest suspicious individuals at Strelitzer Strasse 55, located very close to the West Berlin border barriers that extended along Bernauer Straße. Schultz and his fellow border guards were not informed of the real purpose of the operation: the Stasi had learned from informants about an escape operation. While investigating the area near the border, the two Stasi agents met two men who were assisting an escape operation in the foyer of the building at Strelitzer Straße 55. The escape helpers mistook the Stasi agents for escapees, and were able to leave the building without raising suspicion by claiming that they had to get a friend who had just been released from custody. The Stasi agents left the escape helpers to await their return while they organized support from the border guards.

Taking several months to accomplish, a group of West Berlin students dug a 145-meter (475') long tunnel in secrecy, which began at a closed bakery on Bernauer Straße, and continued eleven meters (36') underground to an outhouse located in the courtyard of the building at Strelitzer Strasse 55. This tunnel later became famous as "Tunnel 57," referring to the number of people who had succeeded in escaping through it on the nights of 3 and 4 October 1964. One of the escape helpers was Reinhard Furrer (the future astronaut), who waited with Christian Zobel and two other escape helpers on the East Berlin side, ready to direct fugitives to the tunnel's opening. At about half past midnight, the two Stasi agents returned with the border guards, including Schultz, who approached Furrer before he recognized much too late that a gun was pointed in his direction. Familiar with the surroundings, Furrer quickly receded into the courtyard and, before disappearing into the tunnel, warned his friends of the incoming guards. As the Stasi agents and border guards entered the courtyard there was an exchange of gunfire with the escape helpers, where Schultz was hit in the shoulder by a bullet from Zobel's gun, causing him to fall to the ground. While attempting to get back up, Schultz was hit again by a larger 7.62x39mm round fired from the Kalashnikov rifle used by a fellow border guard. The shootout ended when the escape helpers were able to use the tunnel to escape themselves at the last minute and enter the safety of West Berlin. Schultz died on the way to the Krankenhaus der Volkspolizei (People's Police Hospital).

== Burial ==
The East German government gave the highest visibility to Schultz's funeral, which received full military honors in the Friedrich-Engels barracks in East Berlin, and then again in his hometown, Rostock. When the coffin was transferred from East Berlin to Rostock, tens of thousands of workers followed government orders to line the streets and pay their last respects to Schultz, who was then buried in the Neuer Friedhof cemetery in Rostock. On the day of his funeral, the school in Rostock where he had been a teacher was given the honorary name "Egon Schultz Oberschule" (Egon Schultz Secondary School). Eventually, more than a hundred collectives, schools and institutions were named after Egon Schultz.

== Aftermath ==
Investigations were opened in East Germany and West Berlin against the escape helpers, who admitted to West Berlin investigators that one of them did fire a gun, but there was no proof that Egon Schultz was killed from that particular gunshot. The East German government claimed that Egon Schultz was tragically murdered by Western agents. The East Berlin prosecutor's office refused to cooperate with requests from the West Berlin investigation, and instead demanded the extradition of the "murder suspect" Christian Zobel. East German authorities quickly discovered that Schultz had been accidentally shot by one of his own comrades, and that the fatal shot came from a Kalashnikov, not from an escape helper. The findings of this investigation, to include disappearance of the autopsy files from the Charité Hospital, would remain highly classified until October 1990, when the 1964 East Berlin files were given to the German federal judiciary. In November 1965, the West Berlin public prosecutor closed the case against the escape helpers, after charging them only a fine for illegal possession of a weapon.

In December 1964, near the Checkpoint Charlie border crossing, balloons floated over the wall towards the eastern part of the city. An open letter to Frieda Schultz, the mother of Egon Schultz, was attached to each of the balloons; it is not known whether or not Frau Schultz, over 230 kilometers (150 miles) away in Rostock, actually received a copy of this letter. This letter was written by the escape helpers who built the Tunnel 57, but the GDR press incorrectly insisted that these escape helpers were the actual murderers, unsuccessfully demanding their extradition. It would not be until after the reunification of Germany that these false accusations were in fact communist propaganda.

A memorial plaque was erected on 4 January 1965, on the house at Strelitzer Straße 55, commemorating Schultz's death and denouncing the West Berlin agents involved in the "assassination". The section of Strelitzer Straße in East Berlin was renamed Egon-Schultz-Straße on 13 August 1966. A popular children's book was written about him, and almost every East German citizen knew his name from school and the media.

The Egon Schultz saga drew great attention not only in East Germany, but also in West Germany, because the Stern editor-in-chief Henri Nannen had purchased exclusive rights to Tunnel 57 in advance, essentially co-financing the building of tunnel. This was partially responsible for increased tensions between the East and West German governments.

On 1 December 1991, the aforementioned Egon-Schultz-Straße reverted to its original name, Strelitzer Straße. About the same time, the Egon Schultz Oberschule in Rostock was renamed Käthe-Kollwitz-Gymnasium. Throughout the former East Germany, many schools and institutions bearing Egon Schultz's name reverted to their original names.

By 1992, prosecutions had begun against former border guards, charging them with murder or manslaughter. A case was opened with regard to Egon Schultz for suspicion of negligent homicide, involving investigation of all the people involved in the incident, including the Stasi agents and the border troops. Neues Deutschland embarked on a major campaign asking for donations to help cover the costs of legal counsel and court fees for the border soldiers who, from the viewpoint of the fundraising initiators, were being unlawfully prosecuted. Almost 200,000 German marks were donated, managed by the "Gesellschaft für rechtliche und humanitäre Hilfe" (Society for Legal and Humanitarian Aid), an association of former Stasi, border troop and Communist Party members. The investigation concluded that Christian Zobel fired the first shot in order to prevent Reinhard Furrer and himself from being arrested. The bullet was lodged in Egon Schultz's lung but did not kill him. The fatal shot came from the Kalashnikov of a border soldier who, on instructions from a Stasi officer, fired shots in the dark courtyard, unintentionally hitting Egon Schultz, who then died from internal bleeding. It was accepted by the court that the border soldier who had fired the deadly shot had acted in self-defense. The case was dismissed since he had been ordered to fire.

In response to the investigation against the border guards and Stasi agents, in May 1994, private individuals pressed charges against Reinhard Furrer for supposedly murdering Egon Schultz. Egon Schultz's mother, who had supported the accusation, was represented by a renowned West Berlin law firm. Additional charges were also filed with the Berlin public prosecutor's office. When Reinhard Furrer died in an airplane accident in September 1995 and it became known that Christian Zobel had already died, the lawyers representing Egon Schultz's mother filed charges against the other escape helpers as murder accomplices, charges which were eventually dropped.

In 2004 a memorial plaque was erected, replacing the one previously mounted (which subsequently disappeared after 1989) on the house at Strelitzer Straße 55. This was done on the initiative of both former escape helpers and friends of Egon Schultz, on the 40th anniversary of his death.

== See also ==
- List of deaths at the Berlin Wall
- Berlin Crisis of 1961
