= Karkowo, Kołobrzeg County =

Karkowo
- Village
- Location within Poland
- Coordinates: 54°1′0″N 15°39′53″E
- Country: Poland
- Voivodeship: West Pomeranian
- County: Kołobrzeg
- Gmina: Gościno
- Postal code: 78-120

Karkowo [karˈkɔvɔ] (German: Karkow) is a village in the administrative district of Gmina Gościno, within Kołobrzeg County, West Pomeranian Voivodeship, in north-western Poland. It lies approximately 18 km (11 mi) south of Kołobrzeg and 98 km (61 mi) north-east of the regional capital Szczecin.
