= Kamica =

- Village
- Location within Poland
- Coordinates: 54°1′20″N 15°38′10″E
- Country: Poland
- Voivodeship: West Pomeranian
- County: Kołobrzeg
- Gmina: Gościno
- Population: 60

Kamica [kaˈmit͡sa] (German: Kämitz) is a village in the administrative district of Gmina Gościno, within Kołobrzeg County, West Pomeranian Voivodeship, in north-western Poland. It lies approximately 17 km (11 mi) south of Kołobrzeg and 97 km (60 mi) north-east of the regional capital Szczecin.

The village has a population of 60.
