= Pławęcino =

- Village
- Location within Poland
- Coordinates: 54°2′8″N 15°36′41″E
- Country: Poland
- Voivodeship: West Pomeranian
- County: Kołobrzeg
- Gmina: Gościno
- Population: 167

Pławęcino [pwavɛnˈt͡ɕinɔ] (German: Plauenthin) is a village in the administrative district of Gmina Gościno, within Kołobrzeg County, West Pomeranian Voivodeship, in north-western Poland. It lies approximately 15 km (9 mi) south of Kołobrzeg and 97 km (60 mi) north-east of the regional capital Szczecin.

In previous centuries, the village of Plauenthin had been a manor type of fief owned in succession by various noble families.

The village has a population of 167.
