= Pobłocie Małe =

- Village
- Location within Poland
- Coordinates: 54°3′1″N 15°43′43″E
- Country: Poland
- Voivodeship: West Pomeranian
- County: Kołobrzeg
- Gmina: Gościno

Pobłocie Małe [pɔˈbwɔt͡ɕɛ ˈmawɛ] (German: Klein Pobloth) is a village in the administrative district of Gmina Gościno, within Kołobrzeg County, West Pomeranian Voivodeship, in north-western Poland. It lies approximately 17 km (11 mi) south-east of Kołobrzeg and 104 km (65 mi) north-east of the regional capital Szczecin.
