= Jeziorki, Kołobrzeg County =

Jeziorki
- Settlement
- Location within Poland
- Coordinates: 54°3′42″N 15°38′9″E
- Country: Poland
- Voivodeship: West Pomeranian
- County: Kołobrzeg
- Gmina: Gościno

Jeziorki [jɛˈʑɔrki] (German: Seehof) is a settlement in the administrative district of Gmina Gościno, within Kołobrzeg County, West Pomeranian Voivodeship, in north-western Poland.
