= Robuń =

- Village
- Location within Poland
- Coordinates: 54°0′34″N 15°43′33″E
- Country: Poland
- Voivodeship: West Pomeranian
- County: Kołobrzeg
- Gmina: Gościno
- Population: 400

Robuń (Polish: [ˈrɔbuj̃]; German: Rabuhn) is a village in the administrative district of Gmina Gościno, within Kołobrzeg County, West Pomeranian Voivodeship, in north-western Poland. It lies approximately 21 km (13 mi) south-east of Kołobrzeg and 100 km (62 mi) north-east of the regional capital Szczecin.

The village has a population of 400.
