= Gmina Gościno =

Gmina Gościno Gościno Commune
- Gmina
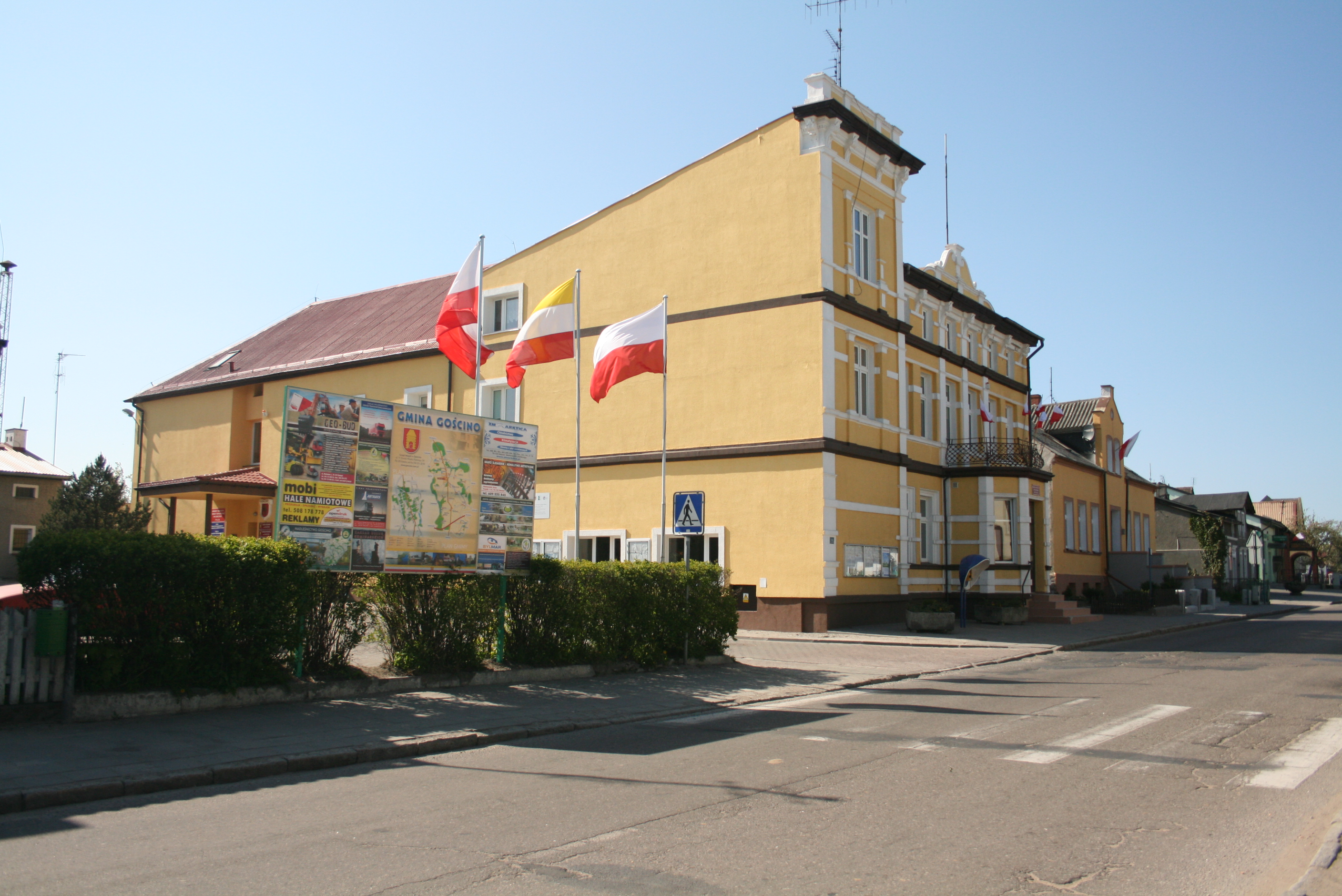
- Gmina office in Gościno

- Flag Coat of arms
- Interactive map of Gmina Gościno
- Coordinates (Gościno): 54°3′13″N 15°39′2″E
- Country: Poland
- Voivodeship: West Pomeranian
- County: Kołobrzeg
- Seat: Gościno

Area
  - Total: 116.04 km^{2} (44.80 sq mi)

Population (2006)
  - Total: 5,136
  - Density: 44.26/km^{2} (114.6/sq mi)
- Time zone: UTC+1 (CET)
  - Summer (DST): UTC+2 (CEST)
- Vehicle registration: ZKL

Gmina Gościno is an urban-rural gmina (administrative district) in Kołobrzeg County, West Pomeranian Voivodeship, in north-western Poland. Its seat is the town of Gościno, which lies approximately 14 kilometres (9 mi) south-east of Kołobrzeg and 100 km (62 mi) north-east of the regional capital Szczecin.

The gmina covers an area of 116.04 square kilometres (44.8 sq mi), and as of 2006 its total population was 5,136. Before 2011 it was classed as a rural gmina, becoming urban-rural on 1 January 2011 when Gościno became a town.

== Villages ==
Apart from the town of Gościno, the gmina contains the villages and settlements of Dargocice, Gościno-Dwór, Jarogniew, Jeziorki, Kamica, Karkowo, Lubkowice, Mołtowo, Myślino, Ołużna, Pławęcino, Pobłocie Małe, Ramlewo, Robuń, Sikorzyce, Skronie, Wartkowo, Wierzbka Dolna, Wierzbka Górna and Ząbrowo.

== Neighbouring gminas ==
Gmina Gościno is bordered by the gminas of Dygowo, Karlino, Kołobrzeg, Rymań, Siemyśl and Sławoborze.
