= Ząbrowo, Kołobrzeg County =

Ząbrowo
- Village
- Location within Poland
- Coordinates: 54°5′15″N 15°37′49″E
- Country: Poland
- Voivodeship: West Pomeranian
- County: Kołobrzeg
- Gmina: Gościno

Ząbrowo [zɔmˈbrɔvɔ] (German: Semmerow) is a village in the administrative district of Gmina Gościno, within Kołobrzeg County, West Pomeranian Voivodeship, in north-western Poland. It lies approximately 10 km (6 mi) south-east of Kołobrzeg and 102 km (63 mi) north-east of the regional capital Szczecin.
