= Gościno =

- Town
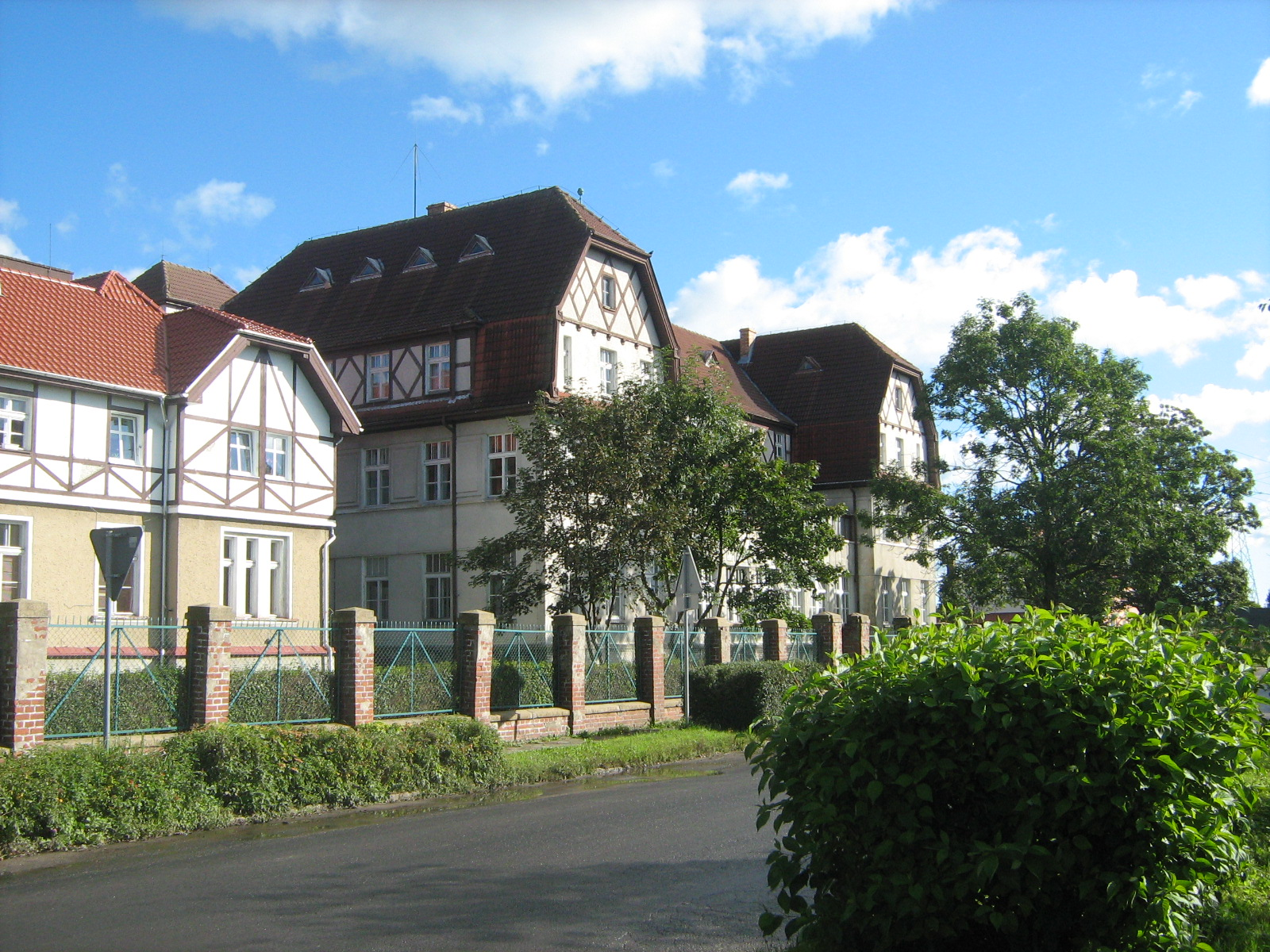
- Karlińska Street

- Coat of arms

- Location within Poland
- Coordinates: 54°3′13″N 15°39′2″E
- Country: Poland
- Voivodeship: West Pomeranian
- County: Kołobrzeg
- Gmina: Gościno
- First mentioned: 13th century
- Town rights: 2011
- Population: 2,332
- Time zone: UTC+1 (CET)
  - Summer (DST): UTC+2 (CEST)
- Postal code: 78-120
- Area code: +48 94
- Car plates: ZKL

Gościno (Polish: [ɡɔɕˈt͡ɕinɔ]; Kashubian: Gòscëno; German: Groß Jestin) is a small town in Kołobrzeg County, West Pomeranian Voivodeship, in north-western Poland. It is the seat of the gmina (administrative district) called Gmina Gościno. It lies in Pomerania, approximately 14 km (9 mi) south-east of Kołobrzeg and 100 km (62 mi) north-east of the regional capital Szczecin.

The town has a population of 2,332.

== History ==
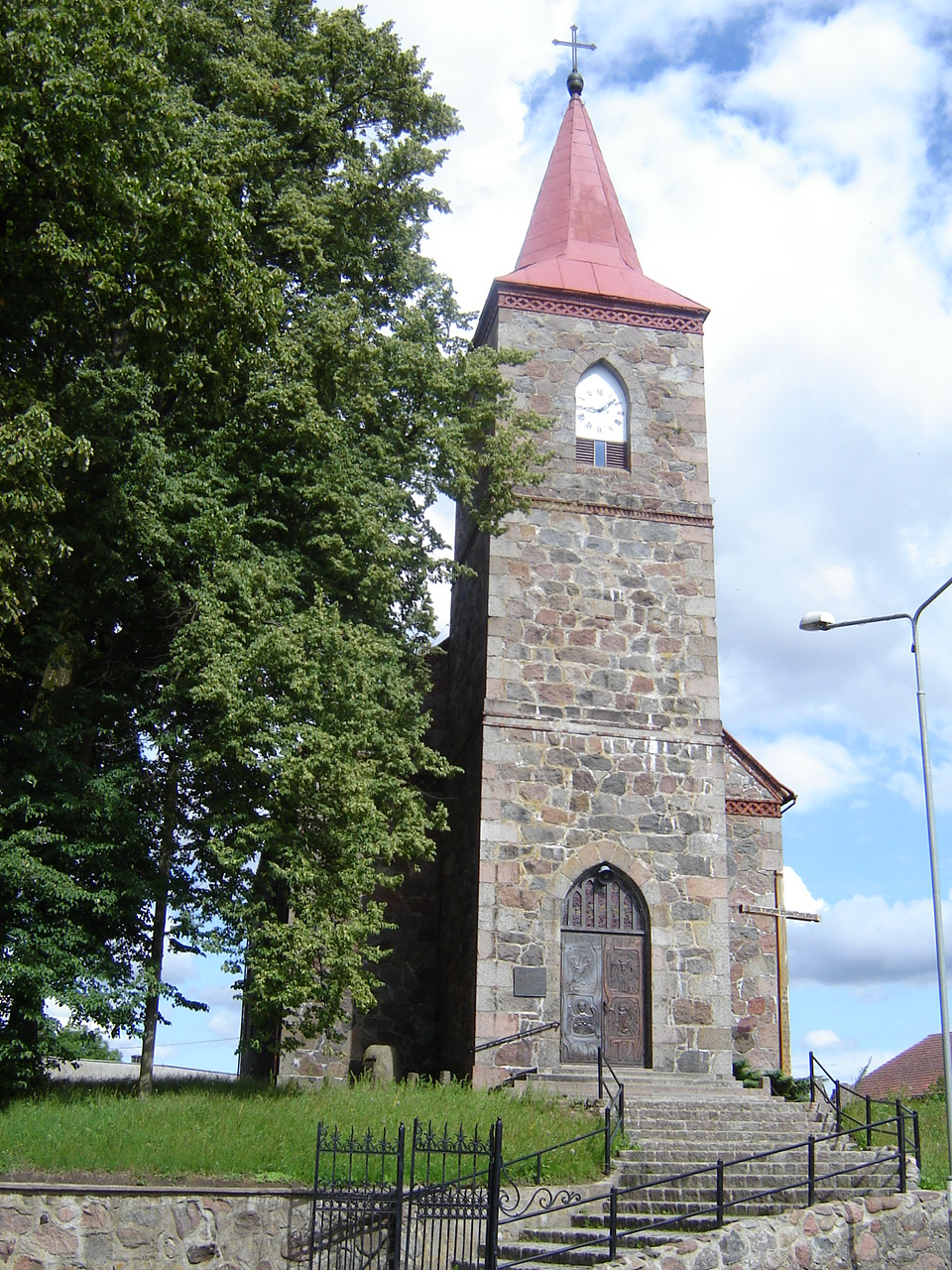
Saint Andrew Bobola church

The territory became part of the emerging Duchy of Poland under its first ruler Mieszko I around 967. The earliest documentation of the village of Gościno appears in the year 1238 as a property of the Knights of St. John of Jerusalem. The town's name derives from the Old Polish male name Gościmir. A main tourist site in Gościno, the Church of St. Andrew Bobola, houses a cup-shaped baptismal font hewn from one Gotland limestone boulder, from the 12th and 13th centuries. It is one of the few sacred relics of this kind in Western Pomerania.

During earlier centuries the settlement had been a domain owned and farmed out by the town of Kołobrzeg. It had been bought by the town's magistrate in the 14th century from the abbot of Doberan Abbey. Around 1780 the domain included 16 farm houses.

From the 18th century the village was part of the Kingdom of Prussia and from 1871 to 1945 it was also part of Germany, administratively located in the Landkreis Kolberg-Körlin of the Province of Pomerania. During World War II, in February 1945, a German-perpetrated death march of Allied prisoners-of-war from the Stalag XX-B POW camp passed through the town. After the defeat of Nazi Germany in the war in 1945 the area became again part of Poland.

Since 1 January 2011 Gościno has had the status of a town.

== Gallery ==
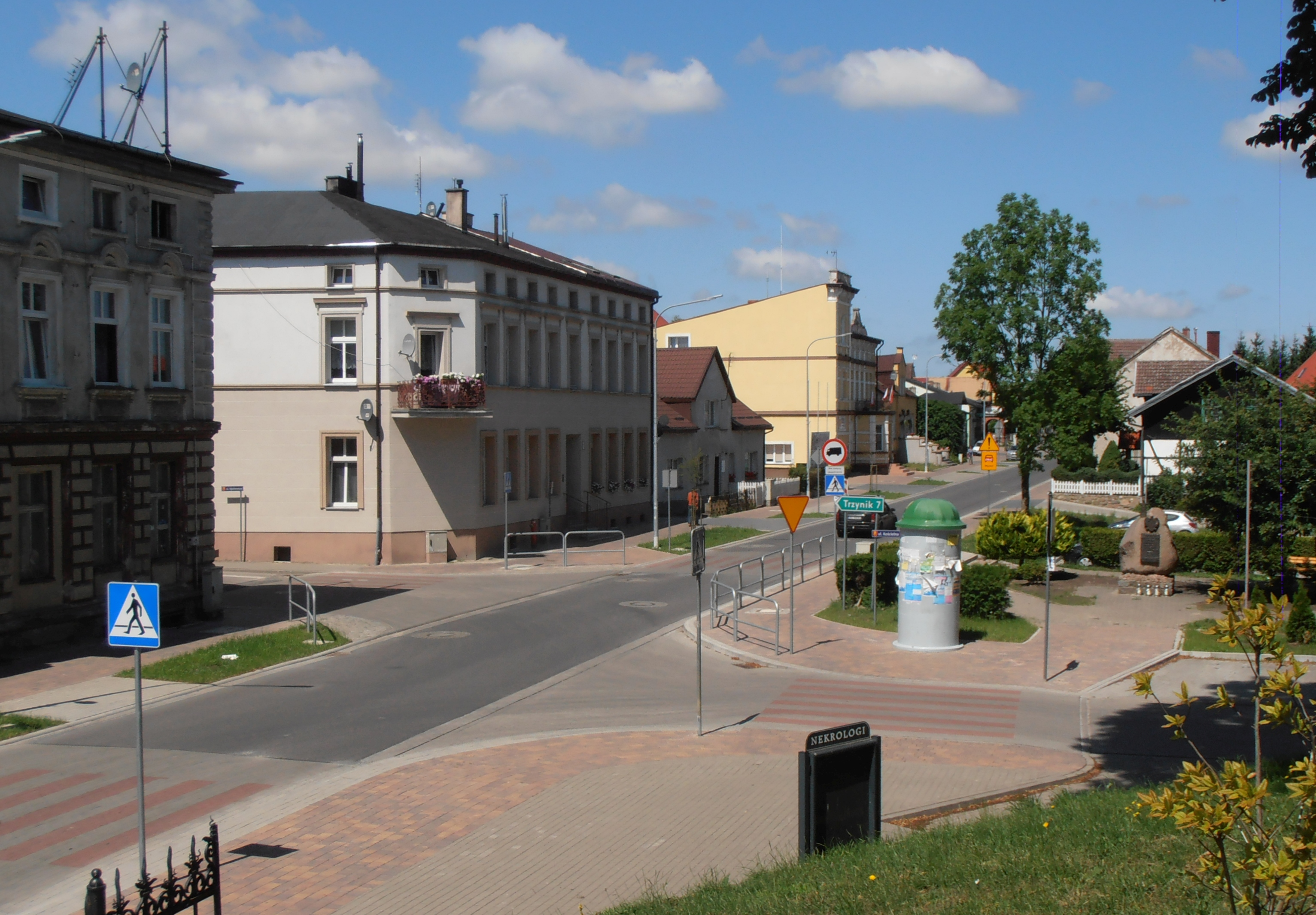
IV Dywizji Wojska Polskiego Street

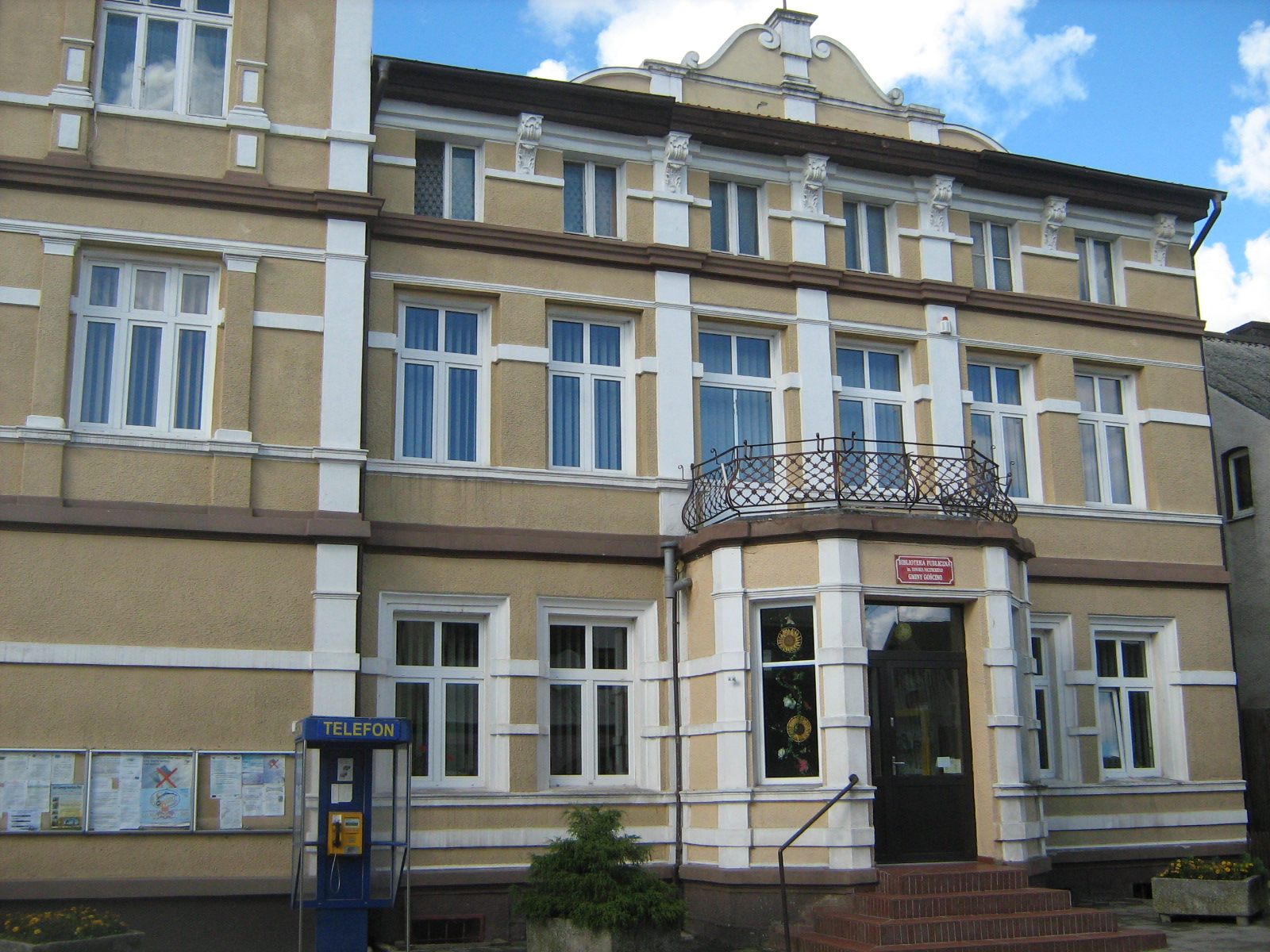
Public library

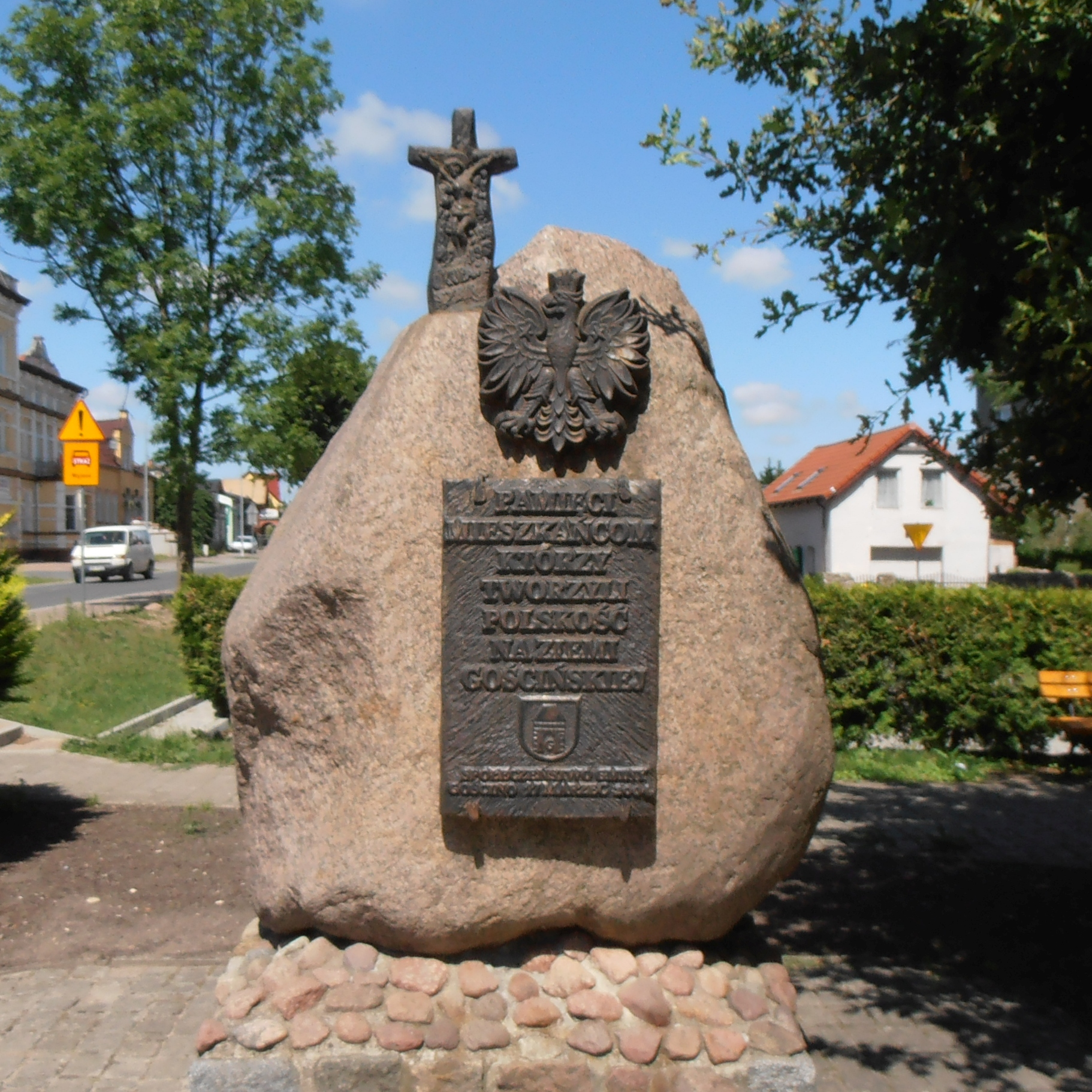
Memorial stone

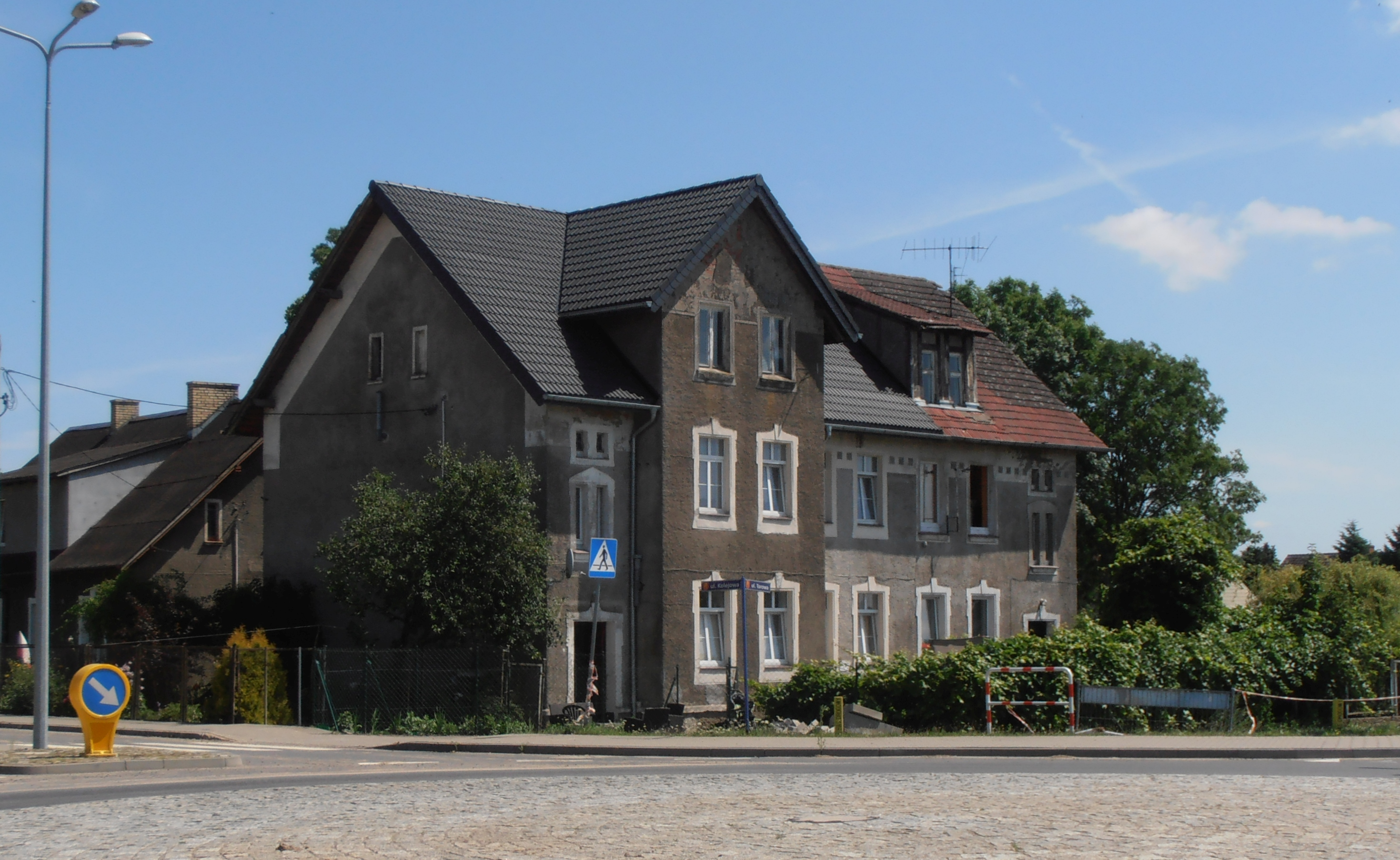
Old house

== Notable people ==
- Egon Schultz (1943–1964) a German sergeant of the East German Border Troops who became the fifty-second known person to die at the Berlin Wall

== See also ==
- Landkreis Kolberg-Körlin
