= Wydrza Góra (Gryfice County) =

Hill in Gryfice County, Poland

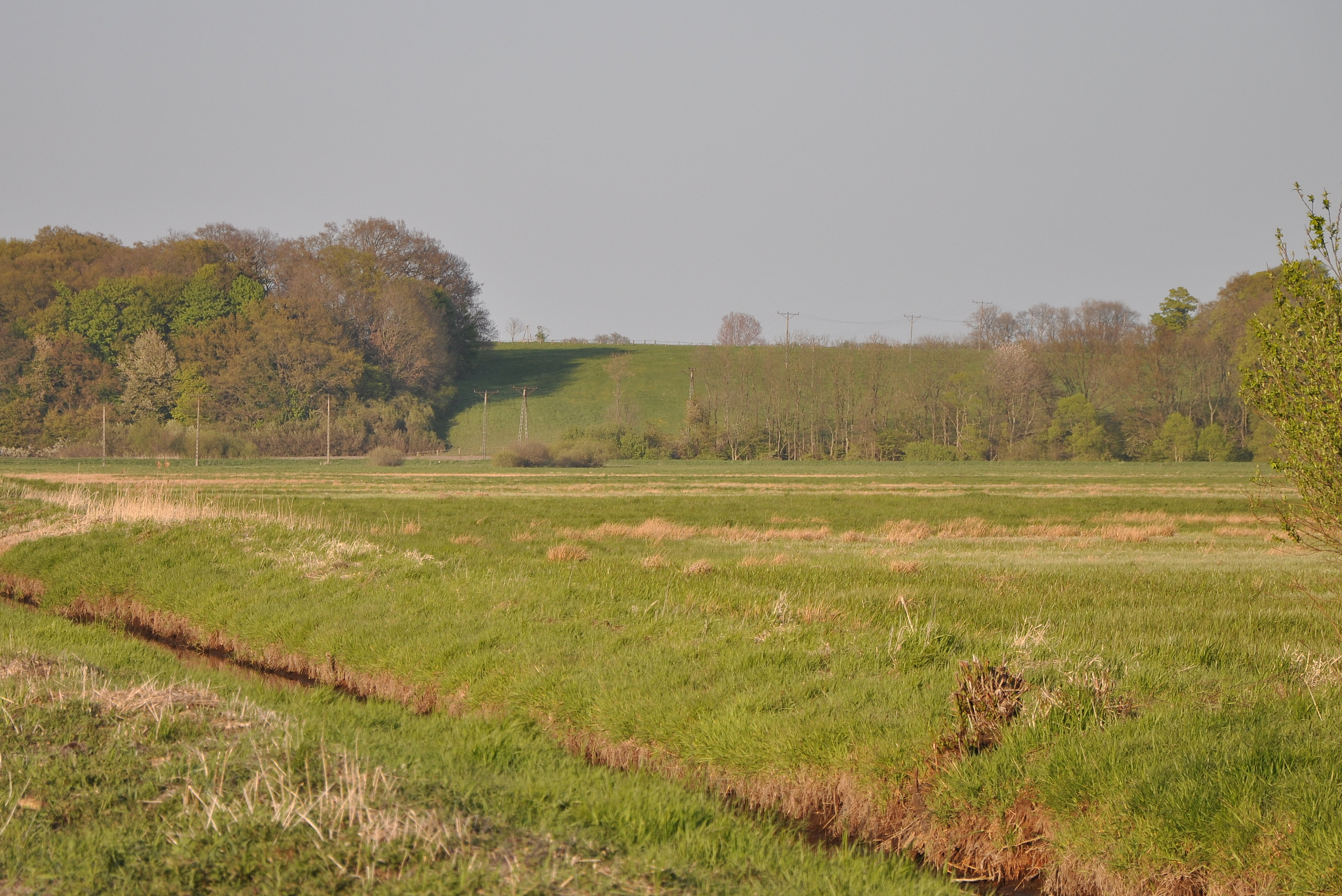
- Wydrza Góra in 2011, as seen from its west side.

Highest point
- Elevation: 30.1 m (99 ft)
- Coordinates: 54°4′56″N 15°14′51″E

Geography
- Country: Poland
- Voivodeship: West Pomeranian Voivodeship
- County: Gryfice County
- Gmina: Gmina Trzebiatów

Wydrza Góra (Note: Translation from Polish: Otter Mountain; German until 1949: Hell Berg, literally: Bright Mountain) is a hill on the Trzebiatów Coast, to the east from Rega river. It is located in the West Pomeranian Voivodeship, Poland, within the Gmina Trzebiatów, Gryfice County. Its height above mean sea level is 30.1 m (98.75 ft).

To the southeast, at a distance of around 0.5 km (0.31 mi) from Wydrza Góra, is located the village of Nowielice.
