= Zapolice =

Zapolice may refer to the following places:

- Zapolice, Radomsko County in Łódź Voivodeship (central Poland)
- Zapolice, Zduńska Wola County in Łódź Voivodeship (central Poland)
- Zapolice, West Pomeranian Voivodeship (north-west Poland)
