= Chomętowo, Gryfice County =

Chomętowo
- Village
- Location within Poland
- Coordinates: 54°2′14″N 15°10′30″E
- Country: Poland
- Voivodeship: West Pomeranian
- County: Gryfice
- Gmina: Trzebiatów
- Population: 254

Chomętowo [xɔmɛnˈtɔvɔ] (German: Gumtow) is a village in the administrative district of Gmina Trzebiatów, within Gryfice County, West Pomeranian Voivodeship, in north-western Poland. It lies approximately 8 km (5 mi) west of Trzebiatów 14 km (9 mi) north of Gryfice, and 80 km (50 mi) north-east of the regional capital Szczecin.

The village has a population of 254.

== See also ==
- History of Pomerania
