= Lewice =

Lewice may refer to the following places:

- Lewice, Greater Poland Voivodeship (west-central Poland)
- Lewice, Opole Voivodeship (south-west Poland)
- Lewice, West Pomeranian Voivodeship (north-west Poland)
