= Gąbin, West Pomeranian Voivodeship =

Gąbin
- Village
- Location within Poland
- Coordinates: 54°1′39″N 15°16′21″E
- Country: Poland
- Voivodeship: West Pomeranian
- County: Gryfice
- Gmina: Trzebiatów
- Population: 185

Gąbin [ˈɡɔmbin] (German: Gummin) is a village in the administrative district of Gmina Trzebiatów, within Gryfice County, West Pomeranian Voivodeship, in north-western Poland. It lies approximately 4 km (2 mi) south of Trzebiatów, 14 km (9 mi) north of Gryfice, and 82 km (51 mi) north-east of the regional capital Szczecin.

The village has a population of 185.

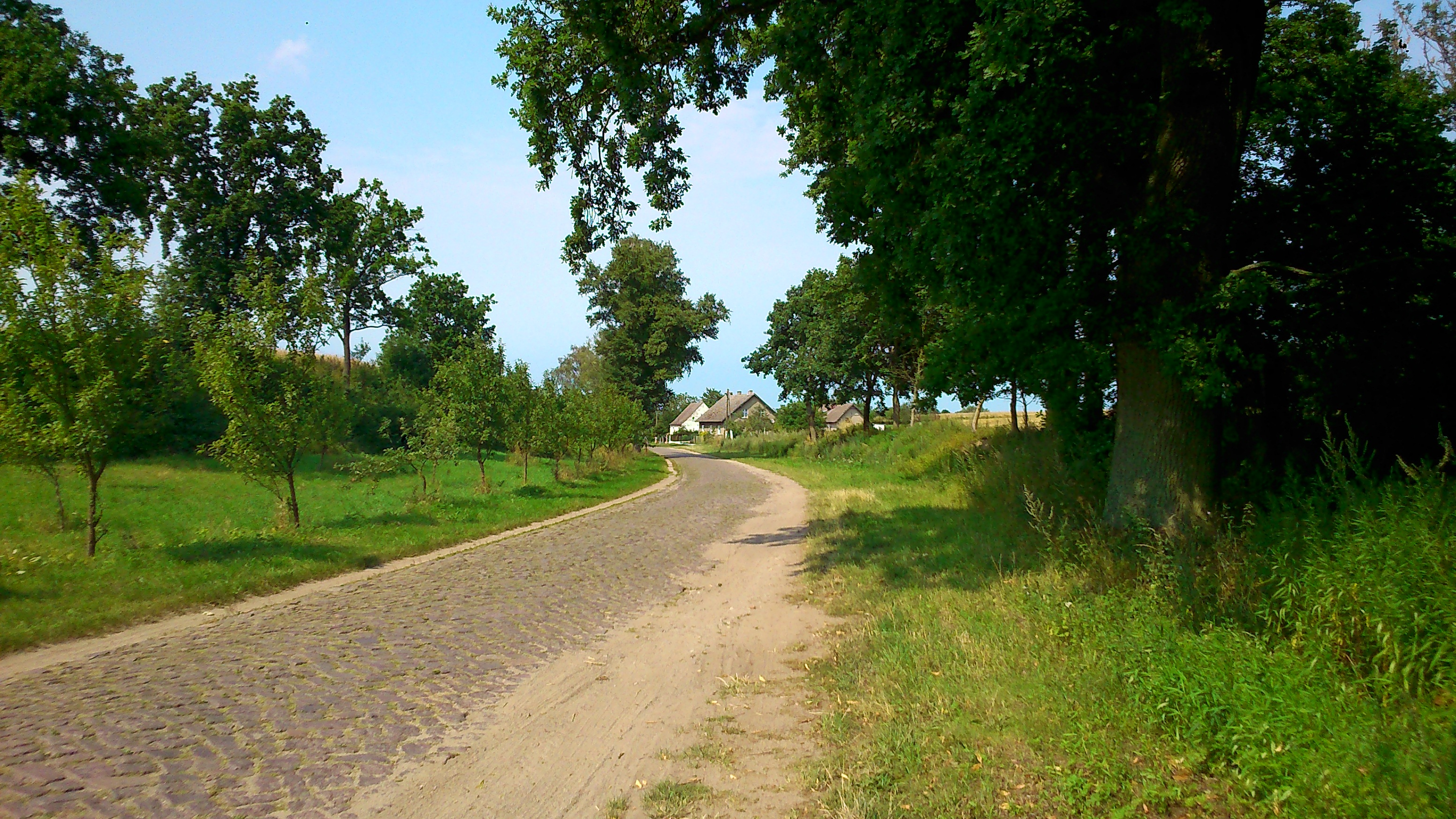
Country road outside Gąbin

== See also ==
- History of Pomerania
