= Bieczynko =

- Settlement
- Location within Poland
- Coordinates: 54°5′0″N 15°20′54″E
- Country: Poland
- Voivodeship: West Pomeranian
- County: Gryfice
- Gmina: Trzebiatów
- Population: 20

Bieczynko [bjɛˈt͡ʂɨnkɔ] (German: Klein Hagenow) is a settlement in the administrative district of Gmina Trzebiatów, within Gryfice County, West Pomeranian Voivodeship, in north-western Poland. It lies approximately 6 km (4 mi) north-east of Trzebiatów, 22 km (14 mi) north-east of Gryfice, and 90 km (56 mi) north-east of the regional capital Szczecin.

For the history of the region, see History of Pomerania.

The settlement has a population of 20.
