= Roby, Poland =

Roby
- Village
- Location within Poland
- Coordinates: 54°7′24″N 15°19′6″E
- Country: Poland
- Voivodeship: West Pomeranian
- County: Gryfice
- Gmina: Trzebiatów
- Population: 251

Roby (Polish: [ˈrɔbɨ]; German: Robe) is a village in the administrative district of Gmina Trzebiatów, within Gryfice County, West Pomeranian Voivodeship, in north-western Poland. It lies approximately 8 km (5 mi) north of Trzebiatów, 25 km (16 mi) north of Gryfice, and 93 km (58 mi) north-east of the regional capital Szczecin.

For the history of the region, see History of Pomerania.

The village has a population of 251.
