= Sadlenko =

- Village
- Location within Poland
- Coordinates: 54°3′3″N 15°11′48″E
- Country: Poland
- Voivodeship: West Pomeranian
- County: Gryfice
- Gmina: Trzebiatów
- Population: 42

Sadlenko [saˈdlɛnkɔ] (German: Zedlinerberg) is a village in the administrative district of Gmina Trzebiatów, within Gryfice County, West Pomeranian Voivodeship, in north-western Poland. It lies approximately 6 km (4 mi) west of Trzebiatów, 16 km (10 mi) north of Gryfice, and 82 km (51 mi) north-east of the regional capital Szczecin.

For the history of the region, see History of Pomerania.

The village has a population of 42.
