= Chełm Gryficki =

- Village
- Location within Poland
- Coordinates: 54°4′4″N 15°13′55″E
- Country: Poland
- Voivodeship: West Pomeranian
- County: Gryfice
- Gmina: Trzebiatów
- Population: 32

Chełm Gryficki (Polish pronunciation: [ˈxɛwm ɡrɨˈfit͡skʲi]; German: Holm) is a village in the administrative district of Gmina Trzebiatów, within Gryfice County, West Pomeranian Voivodeship, in north-western Poland. It lies approximately 4 km (2 mi) west of Trzebiatów, 18 km (11 mi) north of Gryfice, and 84 km (52 mi) north-east of the regional capital Szczecin. The village has a population of 32.

== See also ==
- History of Pomerania
