= Rogozina, Gryfice County =

Rogozina
- Village
- Location within Poland
- Coordinates: 54°4′42″N 15°9′50″E
- Country: Poland
- Voivodeship: West Pomeranian
- County: Gryfice
- Gmina: Trzebiatów
- Population: 175

Rogozina [rɔɡɔˈʑina] (German: Mittelhagen) is a village in the administrative district of Gmina Trzebiatów, within Gryfice County, West Pomeranian Voivodeship, in north-western Poland. It lies approximately 8 km (5 mi) west of Trzebiatów, 19 km (12 mi) north of Gryfice, and 83 km (52 mi) north-east of the regional capital Szczecin. The village has a population of 175.

== See also ==
- History of Pomerania
- History of Gryfice
