= Kłodkowo =

- Village
- Location within Poland
- Coordinates: 54°0′43″N 15°14′41″E
- Country: Poland
- Voivodeship: West Pomeranian
- County: Gryfice
- Gmina: Trzebiatów
- Population: 260

Kłodkowo [kwɔtˈkɔvɔ] (German Klätkow) is a village in the administrative district of Gmina Trzebiatów, within Gryfice County, West Pomeranian Voivodeship, in north-western Poland. It lies approximately 6 km (4 mi) south-west of Trzebiatów, 12 km (7 mi) north of Gryfice, and 80 km (50 mi) north-east of the regional capital Szczecin.

The village has a population of 260.

== See also ==
- History of Pomerania
