= Włodarka =

- Village
- Location within Poland
- Coordinates: 54°5′13″N 15°12′45″E
- Country: Poland
- Voivodeship: West Pomeranian
- County: Gryfice
- Gmina: Trzebiatów
- Population: 226

Włodarka [vwɔˈdarka] (German: Voigtshagen) is a village in the administrative district of Gmina Trzebiatów, within Gryfice County, West Pomeranian Voivodeship, in north-western Poland. It lies approximately 6 km (4 mi) north-west of Trzebiatów, 20 km (12 mi) north of Gryfice, and 86 km (53 mi) north-east of the regional capital Szczecin.

The village has a population of 226.
