= Architecture in Trzebiatów =

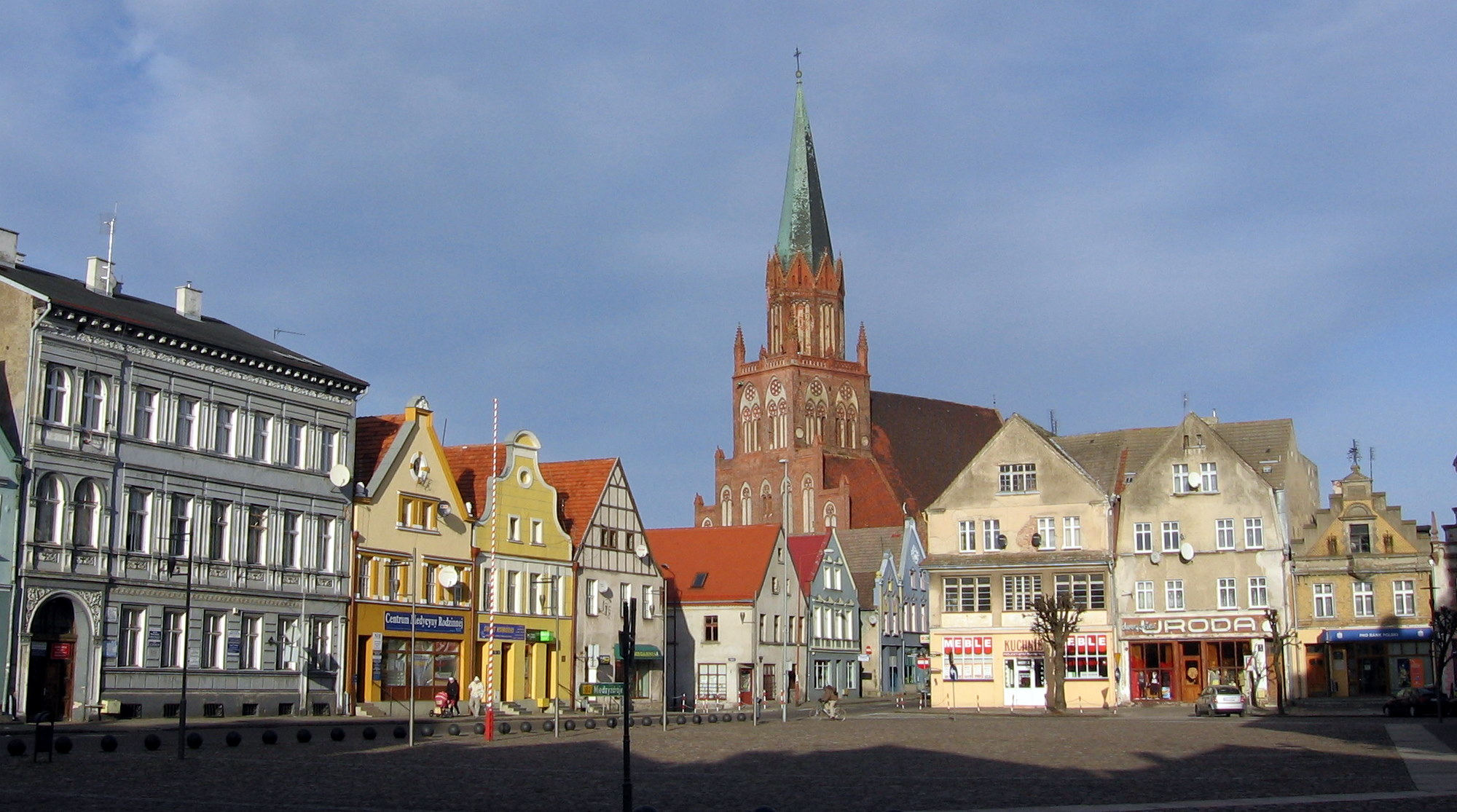
Northern part of the market square in Trzebiatów

Architecture in Trzebiatów is dominated by historical forms from the Middle Ages to the early 20th century. Within the defensive walls, Trzebiatów has preserved over 50% of its historic buildings. The city features architectural elements from the Gothic, Renaissance, Baroque, Neoclassical, and Modernist periods.

== Middle Ages to the Renaissance ==
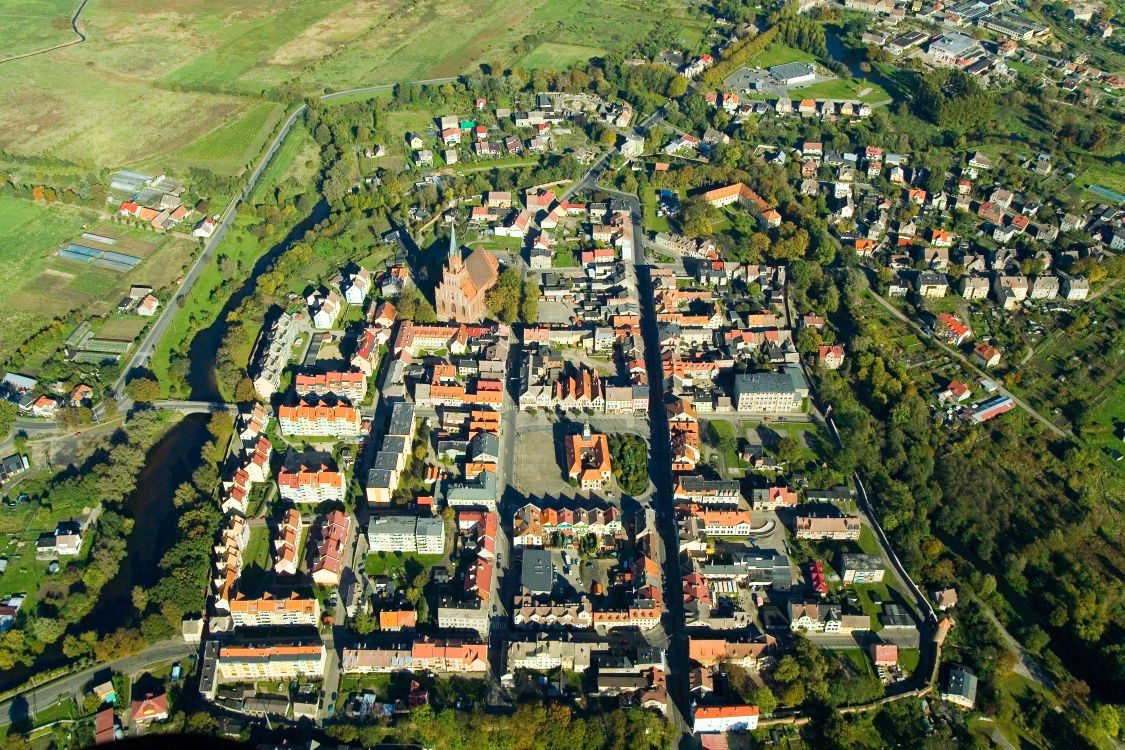
Chessboard layout of the city

The urban layout of Trzebiatów dates back to the granting of city rights in 1277 by Barnim I. The city was established under Lübeck law, resulting in a regular medieval town plan with a market square and a chessboard street grid. The designated area within the medieval fortifications covered 35 hectares and was divided into quarters and plots. The irregular rectangular plan, with rounded corners on the eastern side, included the site of the ducal residence and the oldest Church of St. Nicholas. Around 1285, the buildings on the hillfort were converted into a female monastery, inhabited by the Premonstratensians from the monastery in Mirosławice.

At the city's center, a market square measuring 94 by 104 meters was created, while the construction of the town's parish church was planned in the quarter to the northeast. Another small quarter near the Gryficka Gate was designated for a chapel and the Hospital of the Holy Spirit. The quarters, shaped as squares and rectangles, were formed by a regular network of 14 streets intersecting at right angles, with slight distortions in the eastern part. The plots were divided into 23 quarters.

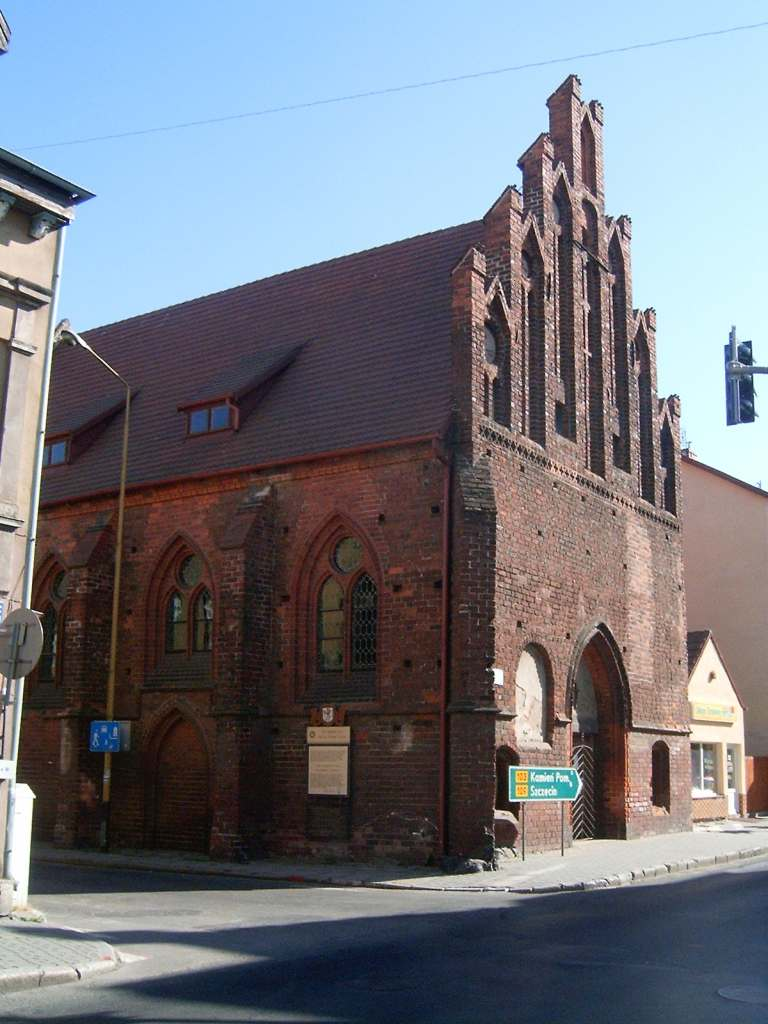
Chapel of the Holy Spirit (currently Orthodox)

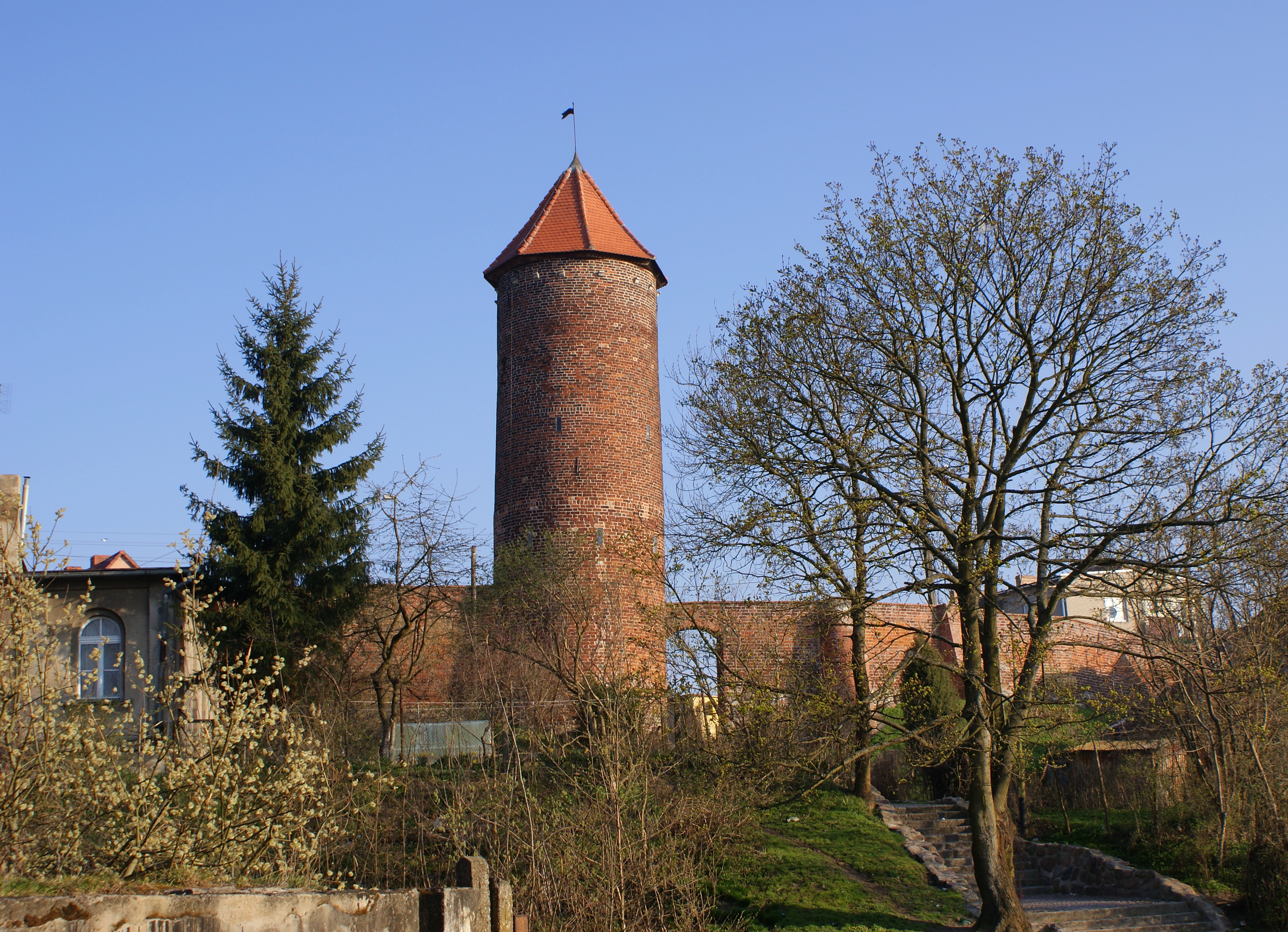
Forewall of the Kaszana Tower

In 1299, Trzebiatów was granted permission by Bogislaw IV to build defensive walls and moats (which were completed by 1337). The city had four gates: Kołobrzeg Gate, on the route to Kołobrzeg before the bridge over the Młyński Canal; Gryfice Gate, on the route to Gryfice; Żeglarska Gate, leading to the northwest; and Łaziebna Gate, on the way to Białoboki. During the construction of the defensive walls, the digging of a wet moat began, which strengthened the city's defense system, especially on the southern, eastern, and southwest sections (near the Gryfice Gate). The fortifications were completed by 1432.

According to the cadastral map of Trzebiatów from 1730, the plots were sized at 9.50 × 36 meters, with those near the defensive walls being half the size. The wealthier citizens had access to the larger plots, while the poorer population occupied the smaller ones. In total, approximately 200 plots were designated in Trzebiatów during the medieval period, although not all were built upon. By the early 14th century, the population of the town was about 1,500 people.

The first houses were built, like in the Slavic era, from wooden beams or interlace. The buildings on the plots were constructed over a period of between 20 and 25 years. Brick houses likely began to appear only towards the end of the 14th century, due to the growing wealth of the burghers (especially merchants). Frequent fires that plagued the city are evidence of the wooden construction in Trzebiatów. The first fire broke out in 1344, destroying the mills, the monastery, and the northern part of the city, the second occurred in 1377, though there is no data on its consequences. The third fire ravaged part of the city in 1496. The first brick houses were built around the market square (however, not all houses were entirely made of brick). The brick used came from a local brickworks, which in 1307 was sold by the Premonstratensians to the town council.

The houses in Trzebiatów were built with gable ends facing the streets. The gables, with two rows of attic windows, were either triangular or stepped. The plots were developed up to about half of their length. The front part was occupied by residential houses with workshops and offices. Behind the houses were outbuildings, usually located on the left side of the yard. The yard walls and outbuildings were mostly built with the use of framing. Medieval houses were partially cellarized at the front and had wooden ceilings.

The plot sizes in the Baltic region ranged from 8 to 9 × 25 to 27 meters. Typically, 2/3 of the plot was built upon. The house had a length of 15 meters. Residential buildings were three-bay, with the main entrance in the center and two windows on the sides. The space of the entire house was filled with a lobby, with a height of 3–4 meters, only a small room (in the right corner) was built. Behind the room, which served as an office, was the kitchen, and at the yard wall, there were stairs leading to the mezzanine. In the yard wall, there was an entrance to the courtyard and to the outbuilding, where the residential part was located. In early development houses, the upper floors housed storage spaces for transport goods.

A late Gothic and early Renaissance composition with a decorated façade is the house at 27 Rynek Street, divided at the ground level by a portal and two wide windows. The gables with volute-shaped edges are accentuated by horizontal cornices. According to iconographic sources, the house at 7 Rynek Street had a very interesting Renaissance decoration, reconstructed in 1900 and recently transformed. Gothic-Renaissance forms are also found in the outbuilding walls at Głęboka and Kopernika streets. On the brick walls, there is the division of shallow blind arches, ending in segmental arches and flat lesenes dividing the smooth surfaces of the walls.

Among the most important buildings in the city at that time were the castle (now the palace), the town hall, the Church of the Blessed Virgin Mary, the Chapel and Hospital of the Holy Spirit, the Chapel and Hospital of St. George, the Chapel and Hospital of St. Gertrude, the mills, the mint, and the brickworks.

== From Baroque to Neoclassicism ==
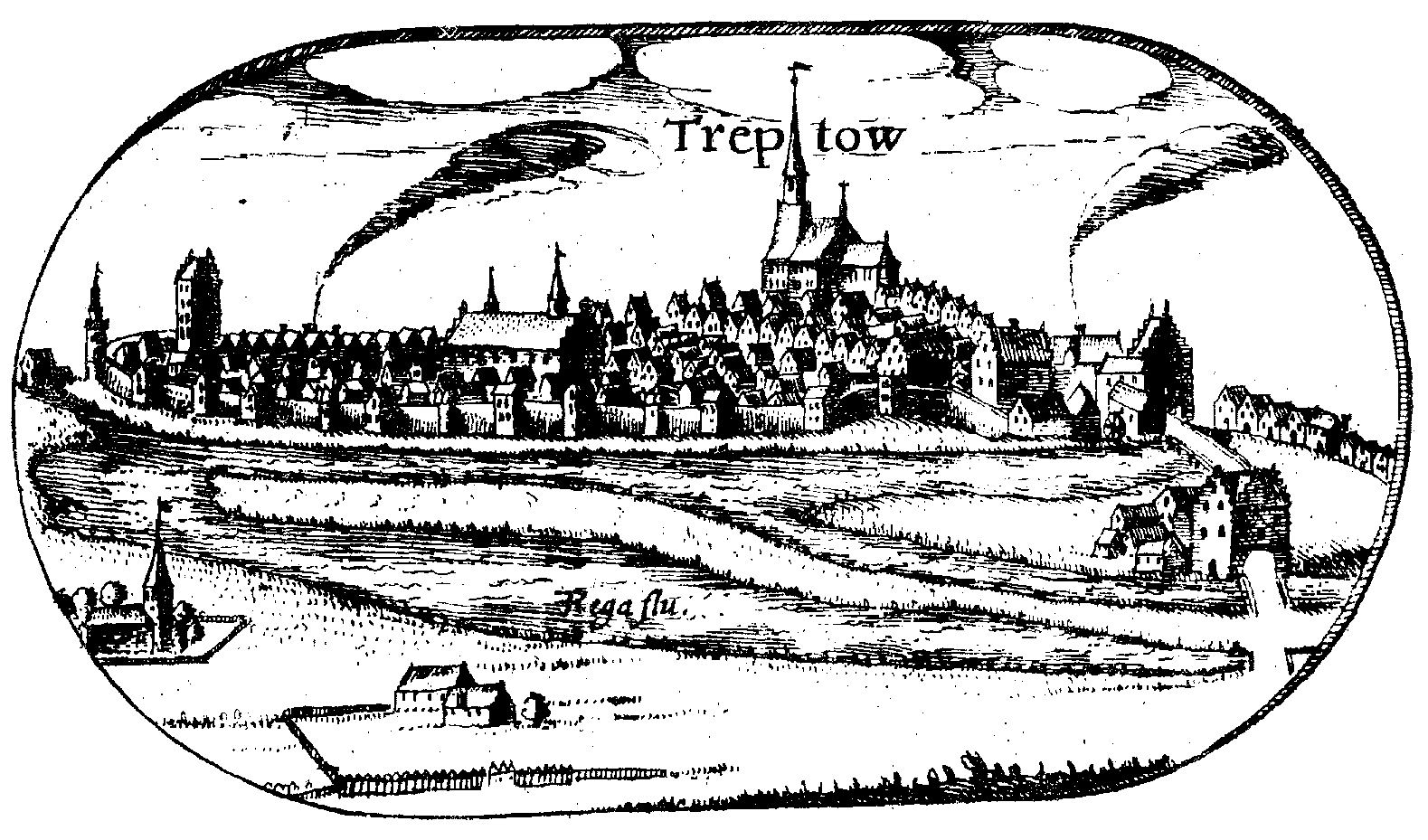
Panorama of the town according to Johann Wolfart on the Great Map of the Duchy of Pomerania (1618)

The oldest view of the town is featured on the vignette of the map of the Duchy of Pomerania by E. Lubinus from 1618, showing the panorama of Trzebiatów from the southeast. The dense town buildings surrounded by defensive walls, with the Kaszana Tower and the Gryficka, Kołobrzeska gates and their foregates, are visible. The city moat, central canal, and the Rega river are also marked, as well as three bridges.

Significant changes in the method of building houses occurred at the end of the 17th century when construction work in the city intensified. This was due to the destruction caused by the siege of the town and fires during the Thirty Years' War (1618–1648). Pomeranian towns, including Trzebiatów, had to endure a real plague of fires. This was reflected in the decree issued by Bogislaw XIV in 1634, ordering the construction of firewalls between buildings. In 1679, another major fire destroyed much of the town's buildings, including the town hall, monastery, and the eastern frontage of buildings along the market square (the first town hall in Trzebiatów had been built in the 15th century). The castle and several previously rebuilt houses were also destroyed. In the 1660s, renovation work was undertaken, evidenced by the opening of the "Pod Orłem" pharmacy in 1668. Around 1680, the reconstruction of the town hall began. It was designed on a rectangular plan with a courtyard in the center. A small tower with a baroque roof and a clock was placed on the roof of the building. In 1691, the reconstruction of the house at 5 Rynek Street, which housed a pharmacy (documented as early as 1596), began.

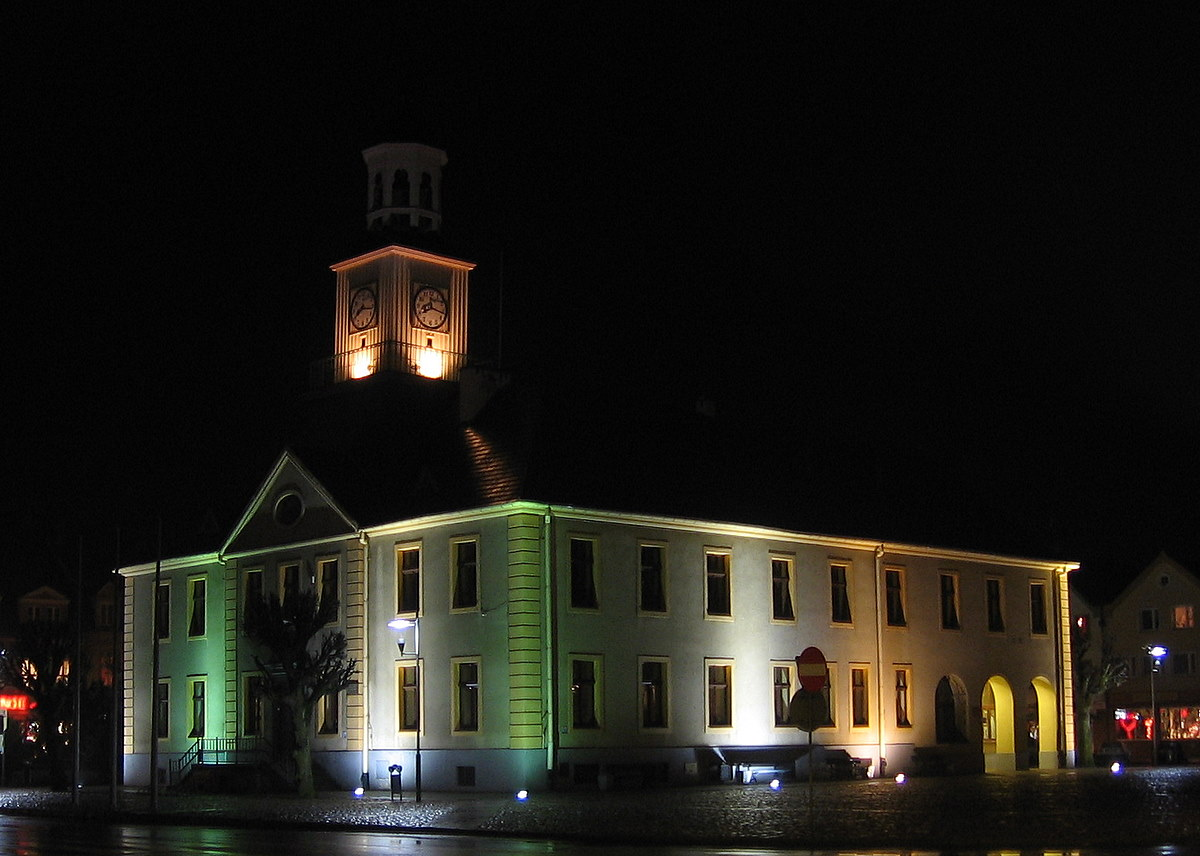
City hall at night

At the end of the 17th century, there were likely significant changes to the city's urban planning. The layout of plots was altered in areas where the destruction of Trzebiatów's buildings had been greatest. The highest concentration of plots was found on the eastern side of the church and along the northern stretch of the defensive walls. However, the plots along the market square remained unchanged. This is evidenced by the preserved original form of the basement walls (front and dividing walls).

According to the cadastral map of 1730, Trzebiatów had about 480 plots in the first quarter of the 18th century, numbered consecutively from 1 to 480. Only a few houses were located on plots wider than 10 m². These sources also provide information about the town's bridges. In total, there were four: one across the Rega river at the end of Głęboka Street, another across Młynówka and Rega towards the Kołobrzeska Suburb, and another one through the swamps (St. Georgen-Teich) in the area of St. George's Chapel in that suburb. According to data from 1740, Trzebiatów had a population of 2,738 people, living in around 300 houses. The rebuilding of the town made use of surviving fragments of basement walls, introducing various savings methods. The dividing walls, outbuildings, and fragments of façades were left, with the shapes of openings and especially the gables being altered, changing from triangular or stepped gables to volute-shaped ones.

The forms of windows, plastering, and façade colors were also changed. According to Z. Radacki, during the Renaissance and Baroque periods, the principle was the uniform color application of architectural details and separate backgrounds for façades. The elements of the details could be darker or lighter than the background. Renaissance townhouses were painted in vivid (intense) colors, while Baroque ones had calmer color tones.

The usable areas were increased by constructing new basements, dug underground, new courtyards, and extensions to the walls of existing basements (e.g., the house at 5 Rynek Street). Almost all basements were covered with barrel and tunnel vaults made of brick and plastered. Through expansion, the layout of interiors changed. In many houses, the hall was removed. It was divided by ceilings into two levels. Narrow, cross-cut communication paths with stairs in the central parts of buildings remained on the ground floors. Right next to the stairs were the so-called "black kitchens", small and unlit rooms with large hearths. The remaining parts of the interiors were usually divided into two sections, each containing one or more rooms.

As in the previous era, the façades of the houses on the market square were built from brick. The rear façades, partition walls, and walls of the annexes were mostly built in timber-frame construction, filled with clay. According to sources from 1720, most of Trzebiatów's buildings were constructed in timber-frame construction, but all houses were to be covered with ceramic roofing tiles by 1743. Thatched roofs were still common on the outskirts for a long time.

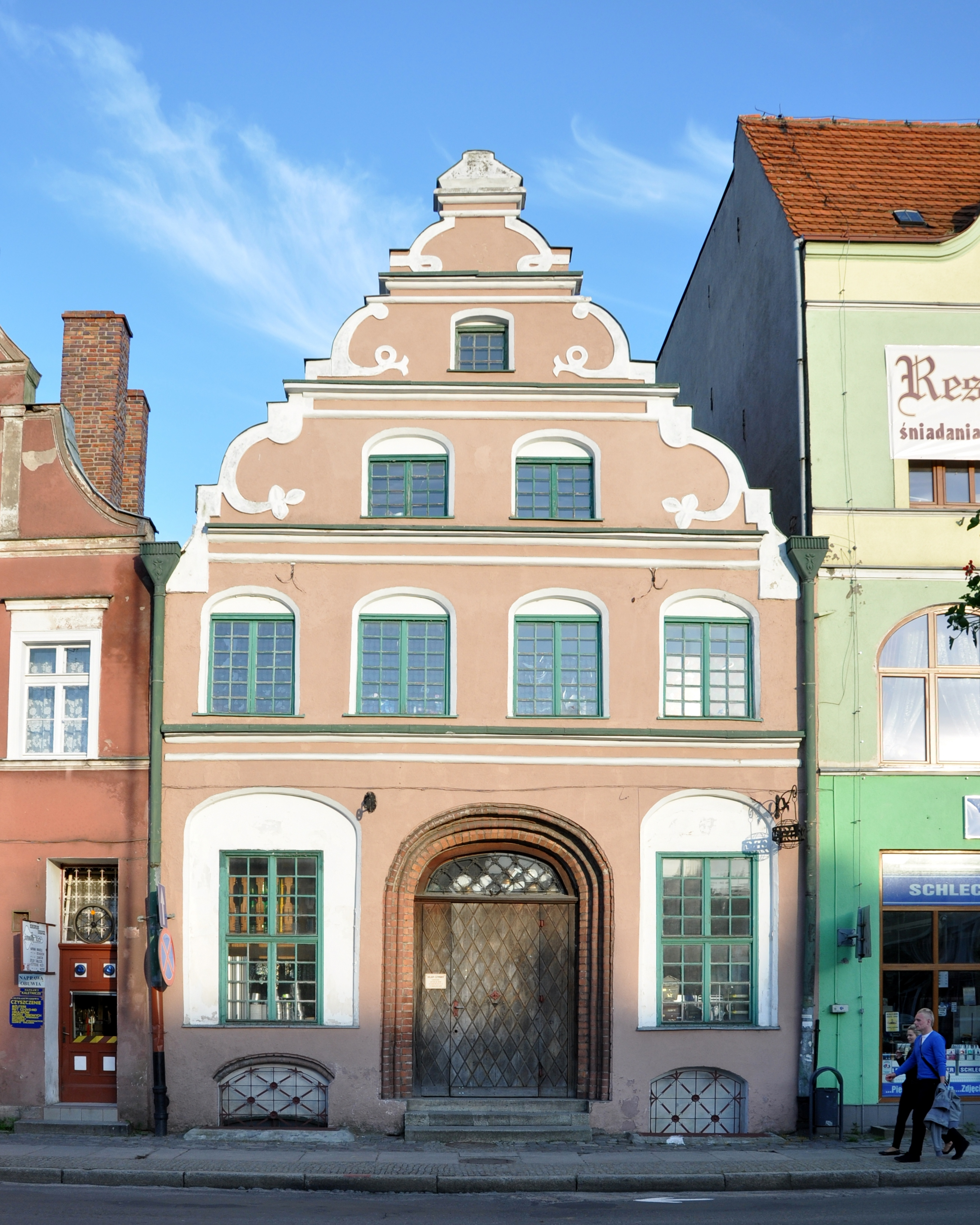
House No. 27 at Rynek Street, from the 15th century, remodeled in the 17th/18th, 19th/20th centuries

In 1747, another fire destroyed part of the buildings within the walls. In 1761, several houses were damaged by Russian troops due to artillery fire during the Seven Years' War. These losses were quickly recovered because the city's economic condition in the second half of the 18th century was much better than in earlier years. During this period, the city also began eliminating moats and city fortifications, transforming them into gardens. The city continued to expand its suburbs, allocating new land for plots. In the Old Town, the buildings became much denser within the plots, creating courtyard-wells. From this point on, there was a growth in population and, consequently, in the number of houses.

Houses built from scratch in the 18th century generally had from 4 to 5 axes on the façade. They were symmetrically built, with an entrance on the central axis and two windows on either side of the entrance. They were usually oriented with the gable end facing the street. They were covered with gambrel or gabled roofs. The decoration of the façades was limited to bands, shallowly profiled cornices, window and door surrounds with keys. Entrances and windows often had basket arch cutouts. Examples of preserved decorative elements can be found in houses at 18, 25, 28, 30 Rynek Street, and in houses no. from 1 to 2 on Krótka Street. Most of them were rebuilt in the 19th century, with the ground floors altered by breaking openings in the walls and creating shop windows, which led to changes in the interior appearance, shifting halls, and walls.

== From the 19th to the 20th century ==
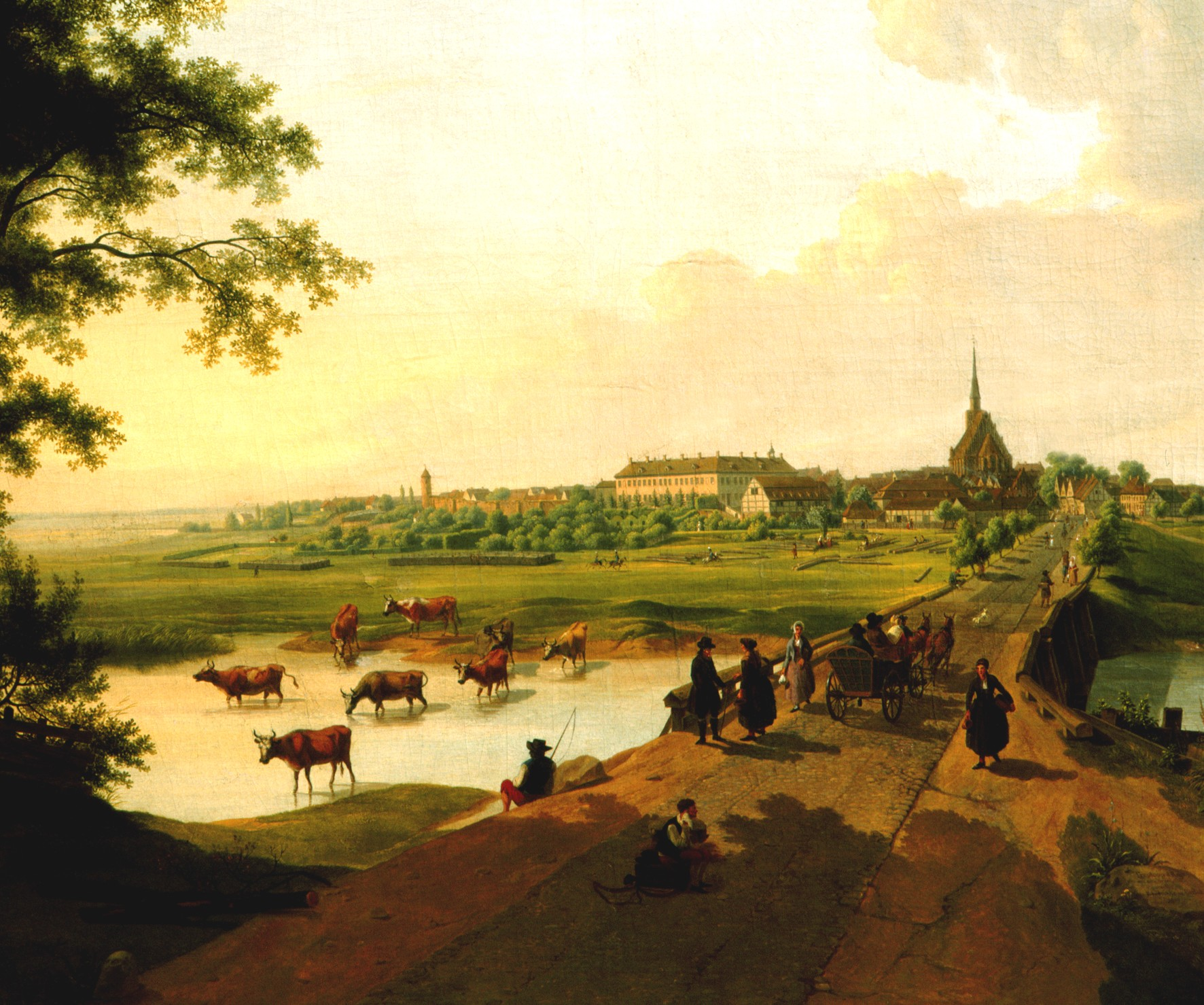
Peter Lütke's painting. The bridge over St. Georgen – Teich

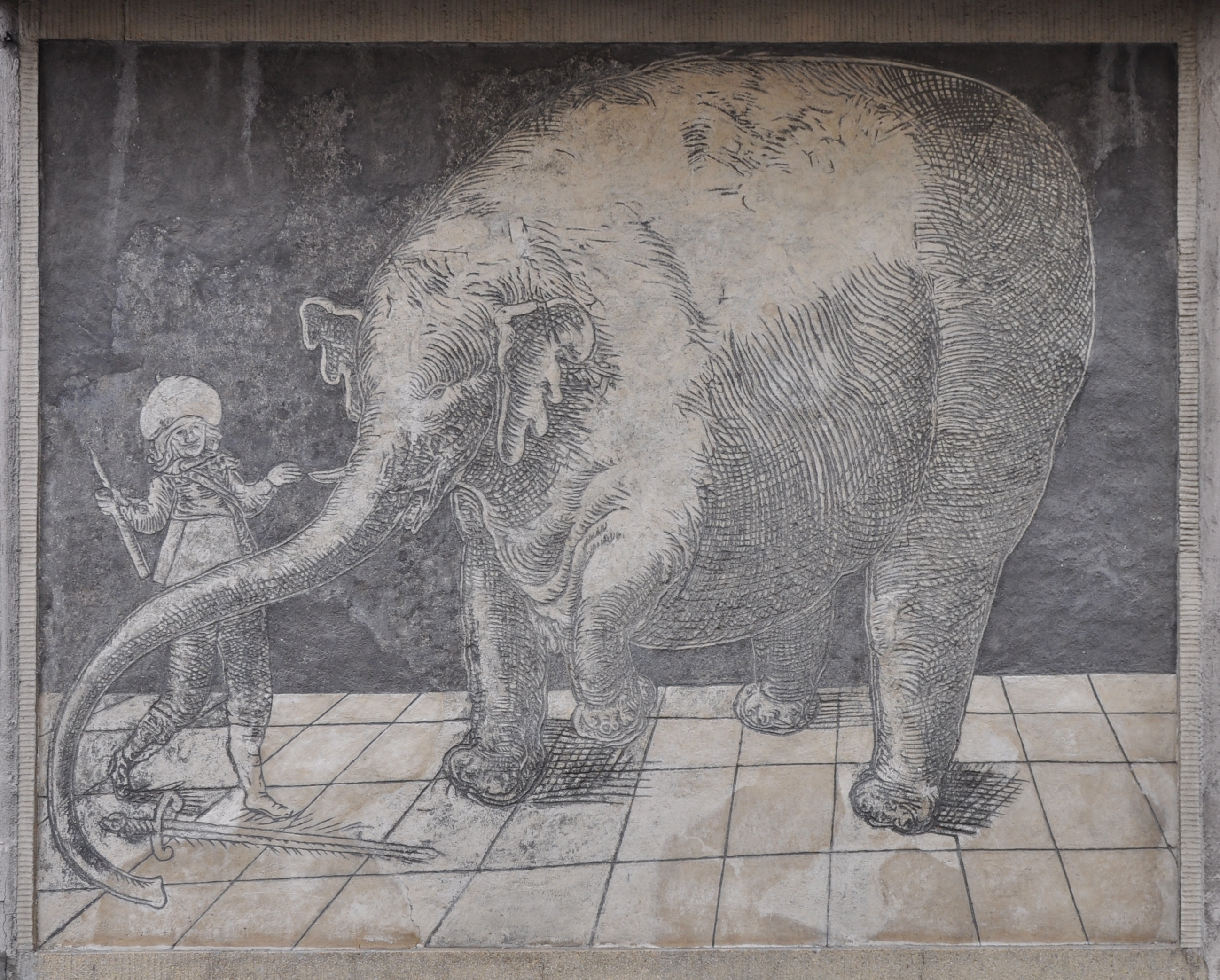
Hansken on sgraffito in Trzebiatów (1639)

At the turn of the 18th and 19th centuries, Trzebiatów had a population of 3,500 living in 550 houses, including 40 in the suburbs. According to data from 1822, the population reached 4,323 people living in 676 houses, including some in suburban areas. The method of construction, including the principles of form shaping, did not change in the first half of the 19th century. No significant changes were recorded, except for minor aesthetic elements.

In 1844, the market square was adorned with a cobblestone surface, and trees were planted. The streets were lit by gas lamps, later replaced by electric ones. Street names were placed on corner plaques. The classicist architecture of the period includes the school building on Lipowa Street, constructed in 1832. Photographs of the façades of buildings along the market square from the late 19th century clearly show traditional forms. The buildings were set gable-end to the streets, with triangular gables alternating with voluted gables, and much more rarely, gables with a Gothic heritage. The houses were partly cellared, one-story, with living attics. They were often remodeled, adapting interiors for shops and services, which involved creating openings in the façades and adding storefronts and new entrances, separate from the residential ones.

In the 1840s, a new bridge was built over the Rega (the so-called "Busse Bridge") towards the Kołobrzeg Suburb. It was constructed on four oak pillars, joined by iron clamps (replacing the older arch bridge, Jachwerk, which had served for 50 years). During the construction of the cobbled road to Kołobrzeg in the 1850s, another new bridge was built (the so-called St. Georgen Bridge). Today, the bridge has been replaced by an embankment, over which the road to the Kołobrzeg Suburb now runs.

In most quarters, new buildings were erected on enlarged plots created by combining two former plots. These were tenement houses with rental apartments. They had separate communication, although the layout remained the same (e.g., houses at 2 and 3 Rynek Street, eastern façade). The differences between the earlier buildings and those of the 19th century can be traced through the examples of these houses. Both tenements were set gable-end to the market square, had four axes, were cellar-built, and had two floors. The façade decoration gave an impression of enlarged volume. They referred to classical architecture models with strong horizontal divisions in the form of cornices, numerous details in the form of window and door surrounds, and bossage. The storefronts in these houses were also larger (e.g., the house at 8 Rynek Street from 1899, at 7 Rynek Street from around 1900, and at 28 Wojska Polskiego Street, with the year 1900 marked at the gable).

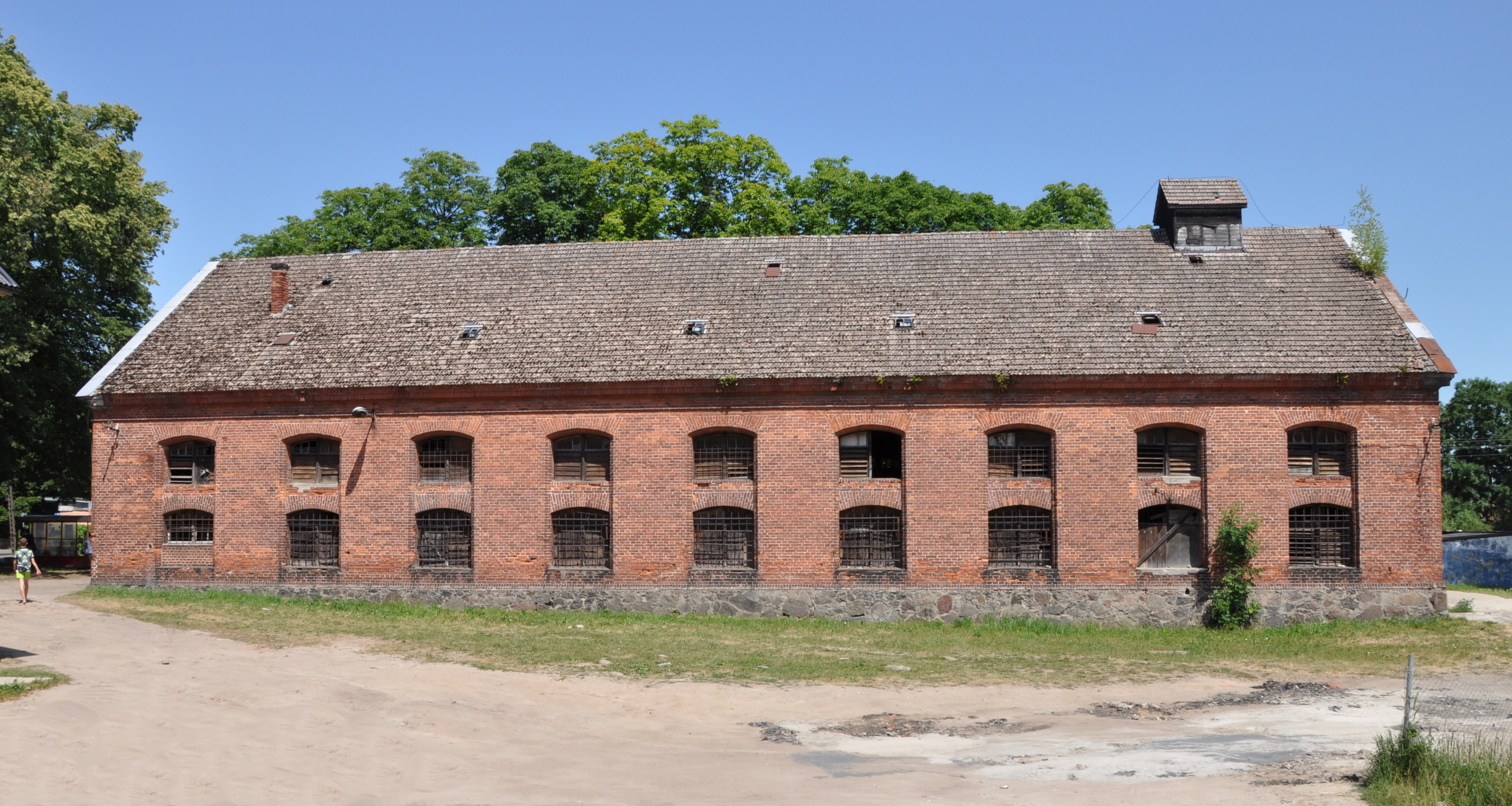
Granary by Lipowa Square, built in 1850

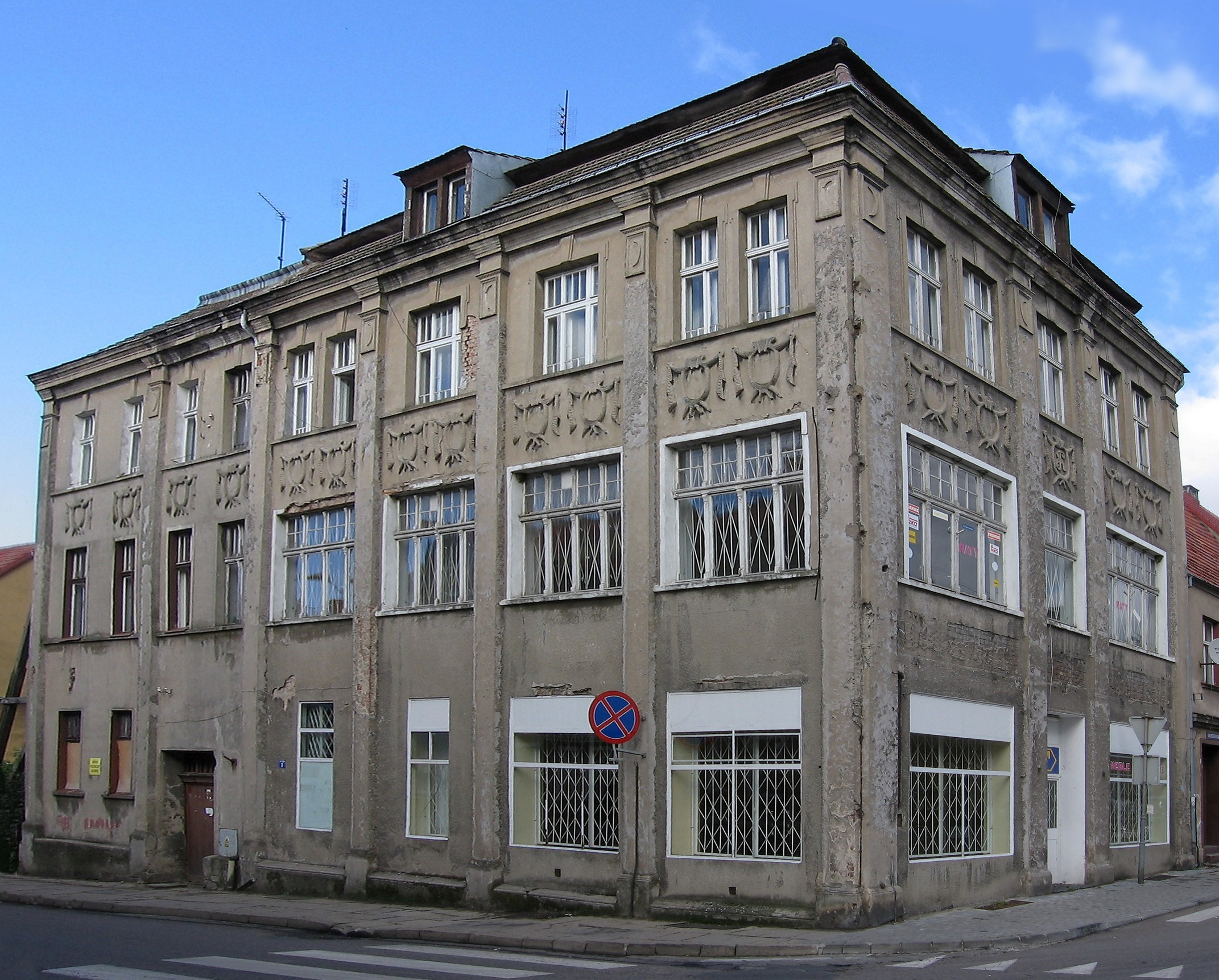
Historic building at 7 Witosa Street

At the beginning of the 20th century, various types of construction were used in Trzebiatów. Around 1907, right next to the city walls, near the former Gryfice Gate, an unknown townsman built a tenement house in the Art Nouveau style. The façades of the house were decorated with motifs of swans, delicate mallow branches, and other details typical of the style. Around 1911, one of the largest tenements within the city walls was erected on the corner of the present-day Witosa Street. The building had a mansard roof and was decorated with cartouches, but its form was closer to Baroque architecture than Art Nouveau.

In the 1930s, several houses at 9, 10, and 26 Rynek Street were remodeled. The old house at 9 Rynek Street was demolished in 1925, and a new one was built on two plots. Like the neighboring house at No. 10, the buildings maintained an ahistorical style with modest decoration reduced to narrow cornices. The façade of the house at 26 Rynek Street took on forms characteristic of the 1930s, with large semi-circular windows on the first floor. The façade of the building from 1639 was decorated with sgraffito, depicting the elephant Hansken with its keeper. The painting was likely created due to an event related to the animal's performance in Trzebiatów (the first in Pomerania). Examples of modernist architecture from the 1940s also appeared (e.g., the house at 2 Szkolna Street, built of ceramic bricks, with a simple cubic form and brick façade).

== After 1945 ==
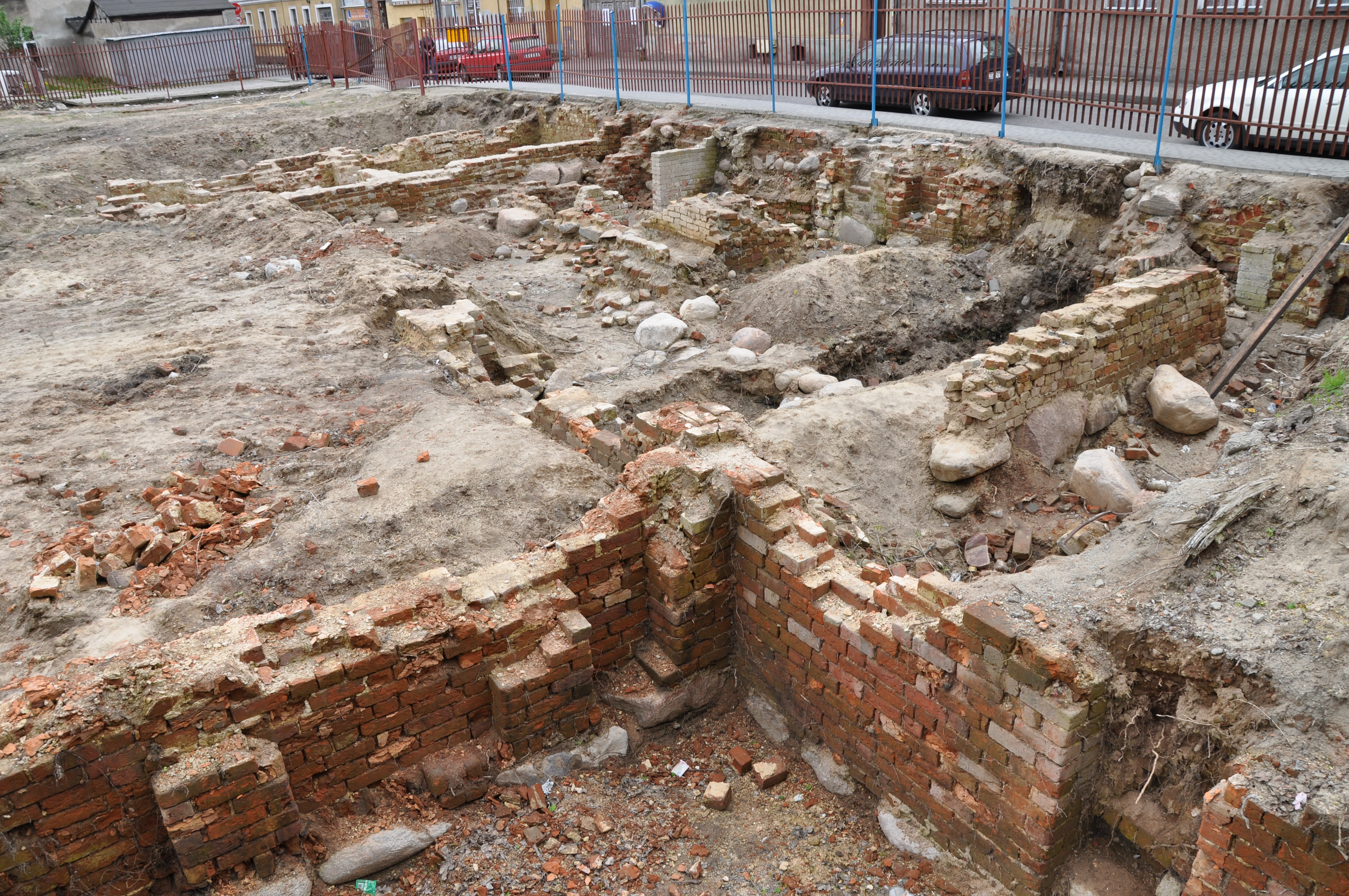
Remnants of the old tenement buildings in Trzebiatów (15th–16th century). Archaeological work (2009)

In 1945, the western frontage of the market square (6 houses with outbuildings from No. 18 to 23) and part of the development on the northeastern side of the town parish church were destroyed. In the 1970s, the western frontage was rebuilt, with several nearly identical buildings erected in place of the former houses, set gable-end to the market square. This method, as well as the building volumes, referred to the original character of the houses, but the façade design was executed in a form that did not reference any known style. During the same period, several multi-family, multi-story residential buildings were erected in two quarters to the north of the church, introducing elements that were completely foreign to the historical city layout. In the 1990s, the house at 6 Rynek Street was rebuilt in a form that referred to its pre-1945 state.

In the post-war period, the city's buildings were used, renovated, and reconstructed in ways that showed little respect for their historical value. Several timber-framed outbuildings were lost, a number of old houses were demolished, and most were renovated without historical and architectural research. Despite the errors in spatial development, the old town of Trzebiatów still represents a unique and richest ensemble of historical burgher houses in Western Pomerania. In 1996, Trzebiatów was included in the Ministry of Culture and National Heritage's "Saving Historic Towns" program.

== Bibliography ==
- Kochanowska, J. (2005). Trzebiatów – spotkania pomorskie – 2005 [Trzebiatów – Pomeranian Meetings – 2005] (in Polish). Oficyna In Plus. ISBN 83-89402-46-7.
