= Siemidarżno =

- Village
- Location within Poland
- Coordinates: 54°1′59″N 15°21′45″E
- Country: Poland
- Voivodeship: West Pomeranian
- County: Gryfice
- Gmina: Trzebiatów
- Population: 109

Siemidarżno [ɕɛmiˈdarʐnɔ] (German: Zimdarse) is a village in the administrative district of Gmina Trzebiatów, within Gryfice County, West Pomeranian Voivodeship, in north-western Poland. It lies approximately 7 km (4 mi) south-east of Trzebiatów, 17 km (11 mi) north-east of Gryfice, and 86 km (53 mi) north-east of the regional capital Szczecin.

The village has a population of 109.

== See also ==
- History of Pomerania
