= Gosław, Gryfice County =

Gosław
- Village
- Location within Poland
- Coordinates: 54°3′11″N 15°24′3″E
- Country: Poland
- Voivodeship: West Pomeranian
- County: Gryfice
- Gmina: Trzebiatów
- Population: 308

Gosław [ˈɡɔswaf] (German: Gützlaffshagen) is a village in the administrative district of Gmina Trzebiatów, within Gryfice County, West Pomeranian Voivodeship, in north-western Poland. It lies approximately 8 km (5 mi) east of Trzebiatów, 21 km (13 mi) north-east of Gryfice, and 89 km (55 mi) north-east of the regional capital Szczecin.

The village has a population of 308.

== See also ==
- History of Pomerania
- History of Gryfice
