= Paliczyno =

- Village
- Location within Poland
- Coordinates: 54°3′20″N 15°21′40″E
- Country: Poland
- Voivodeship: West Pomeranian
- County: Gryfice
- Gmina: Trzebiatów
- Population: 26

Paliczyno [paliˈt͡ʂɨnɔ] (German: Jungfernbrück) is a village in the administrative district of Gmina Trzebiatów, within Gryfice County, West Pomeranian Voivodeship, in north-western Poland. It lies approximately 6 km (4 mi) east of Trzebiatów, 19 km (12 mi) north-east of Gryfice, and 88 km (55 mi) north-east of the regional capital Szczecin.

For the history of the region, see History of Pomerania.

The village has a population of 26.
