= Hermann Mutschmann =

German classical philologist

Hermann Mutschmann (21 October 1882, in Essen – 20 July 1918, at Herlies) was a German classical philologist.

He studied classical philology at the University of Bonn as a pupil of Hermann Usener and Franz Bücheler, then continued his education at the University of Kiel under Siegfried Sudhaus. In 1906 he received his doctorate at Kiel with a dissertation on Aristotle, titled De divisionibus quae vulgo dicuntur Aristoteleis. In 1907/08 he took a study tour of Italy, followed by work as a tutor in Bonn. In 1910 he obtained his habilitation for classical philology, and in 1913 succeeded Christian Cornelius Jensen as an associate professor at the University of Königsberg. During World War I, he died on the Western Front, near the town of Herlies in northern France.

== Published works ==
In 1912–14 he was the author of a two volume edition on the writings of Sextus Empiricus ("Sexti Empirici Opera"). Unfinished at the time of his death, the series was continued decades later by Jürgen Mau (1916–2007). In 1913 he published Tendenz, Aufbau und Quellen der Schrift Vom Erhabenen ("Tendency, structure and sources of On the Sublime" by Longinus).
