= Rogowo, Gryfice County =

Rogowo
- Village
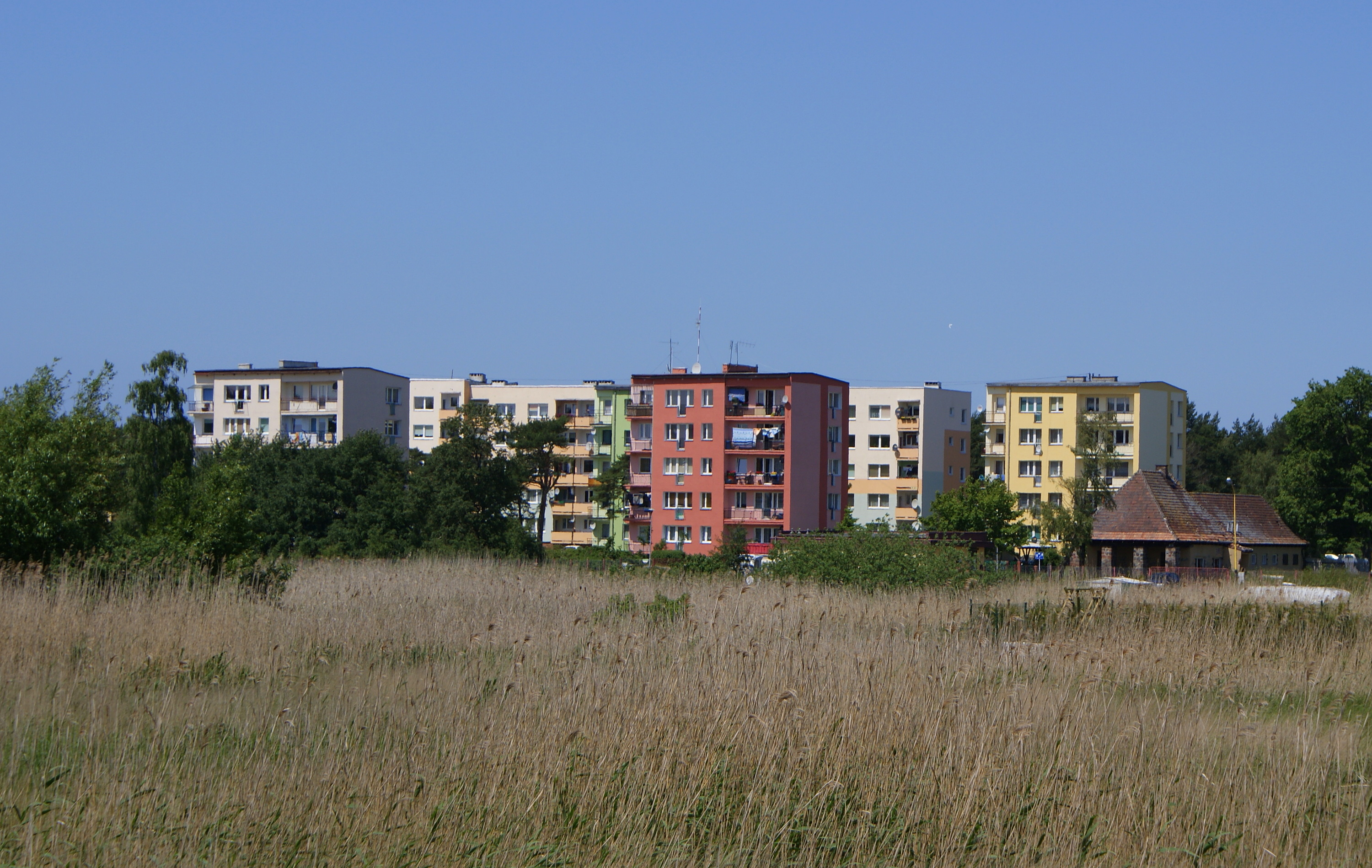

- Location within Poland
- Coordinates: 54°9′1″N 15°19′50″E
- Country: Poland
- Voivodeship: West Pomeranian
- County: Gryfice
- Gmina: Trzebiatów
- Population: 356
- Time zone: UTC+1 (CET)
  - Summer (DST): UTC+2 (CEST)
- Vehicle registration: ZGY
- Website: https://www.rogowo.com/

Rogowo [rɔˈɡɔvɔ] is a village in the administrative district of Gmina Trzebiatów, within Gryfice County, West Pomeranian Voivodeship, in north-western Poland. It lies approximately 11 km (7 mi) north of Trzebiatów, 28 km (17 mi) north of Gryfice, and 96 km (60 mi) north-east of the regional capital Szczecin. Situated on the coast of the Baltic Sea in the historic region of Pomerania, the village has a beach and is a holiday resort.

The village has a population of 356.

== History ==
The area became part of the emerging Polish state in the 10th century. Following Poland's fragmentation, it formed part of the Duchy of Pomerania. From the 18th century it was part of the Kingdom of Prussia, and from 1871 it was a part of Germany. Following Germany's defeat in World War II in 1945, the area became again part of Poland. A garrison of the Polish Army was located in Rogowo in 1952–1998.
