= Mutschmann =

Mutschmann is a surname. Notable people with the surname include:

- Hermann Mutschmann (1882–1918), German classical philologist
- Martin Mutschmann (1879–1947), German factory owner
