= Bieczyno =

- Village
- Location within Poland
- Coordinates: 54°6′12″N 15°21′14″E
- Country: Poland
- Voivodeship: West Pomeranian
- County: Gryfice
- Gmina: Trzebiatów
- Population: 179

Bieczyno [bjɛˈt͡ʂɨnɔ] (German: Hagenow) is a village in the administrative district of Gmina Trzebiatów, within Gryfice County, West Pomeranian Voivodeship, in north-western Poland. It lies approximately 8 km (5 mi) north-east of Trzebiatów, 24 km (15 mi) north-east of Gryfice, and 92 km (57 mi) north-east of the regional capital Szczecin. The village has a population of 179.

== See also ==
- History of Pomerania
