= Gołańcz Pomorska =

- Village
- Location within Poland
- Coordinates: 54°3′51″N 15°22′55″E
- Country: Poland
- Voivodeship: West Pomeranian
- County: Gryfice
- Gmina: Trzebiatów
- Population: 446

Gołańcz Pomorska [ˈɡɔwaɲt͡ʂ pɔˈmɔrska] (German Glansee) is a village in the administrative district of Gmina Trzebiatów, within Gryfice County, West Pomeranian Voivodeship, in north-western Poland. It lies approximately 7 km (4 mi) east of Trzebiatów, 21 km (13 mi) north-east of Gryfice, and 90 km (56 mi) north-east of the regional capital Szczecin. The village has a population of 446.

== See also ==
- History of Pomerania
