= Sadlno, West Pomeranian Voivodeship =

Sadlno
- Village
- Location within Poland
- Coordinates: 54°3′45″N 15°10′27″E
- Country: Poland
- Voivodeship: West Pomeranian
- County: Gryfice
- Gmina: Trzebiatów
- Population: 298

Sadlno [ˈsadlnɔ] (German: Zedlin) is a village in the administrative district of Gmina Trzebiatów, within Gryfice County, West Pomeranian Voivodeship, in north-western Poland. It lies approximately 7 km (4 mi) west of Trzebiatów, 17 km (11 mi) north of Gryfice, and 82 km (51 mi) north-east of the regional capital Szczecin. The village has a population of 298.

== See also ==
- History of Pomerania
