= Gorzysław, West Pomeranian Voivodeship =

Gorzysław
- Village
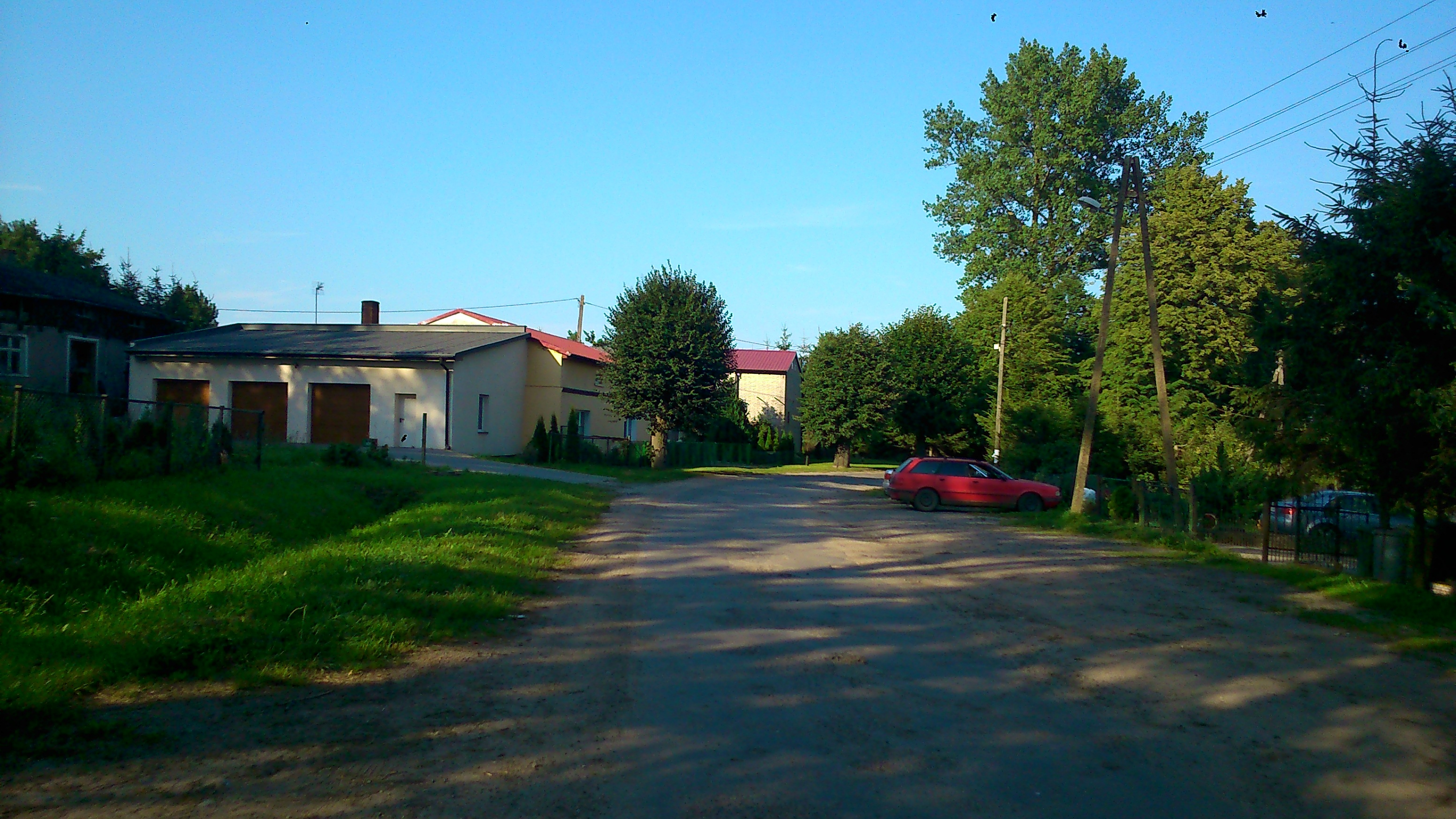

- Location within Poland
- Coordinates: 54°5′31″N 15°17′55″E
- Country: Poland
- Voivodeship: West Pomeranian
- County: Gryfice
- Gmina: Trzebiatów
- Population: 123

Gorzysław [ɡɔˈʐɨswaf] (German: Arnsberg) is a village in the administrative district of Gmina Trzebiatów, within Gryfice County, West Pomeranian Voivodeship, in north-western Poland. It lies approximately 5 km (3 mi) north of Trzebiatów, 21 km (13 mi) north of Gryfice, and 89 km (55 mi) north-east of the regional capital Szczecin.

For the history of the region, see History of Pomerania.

The village has a population of 123.
