= Nowielice =

- Village
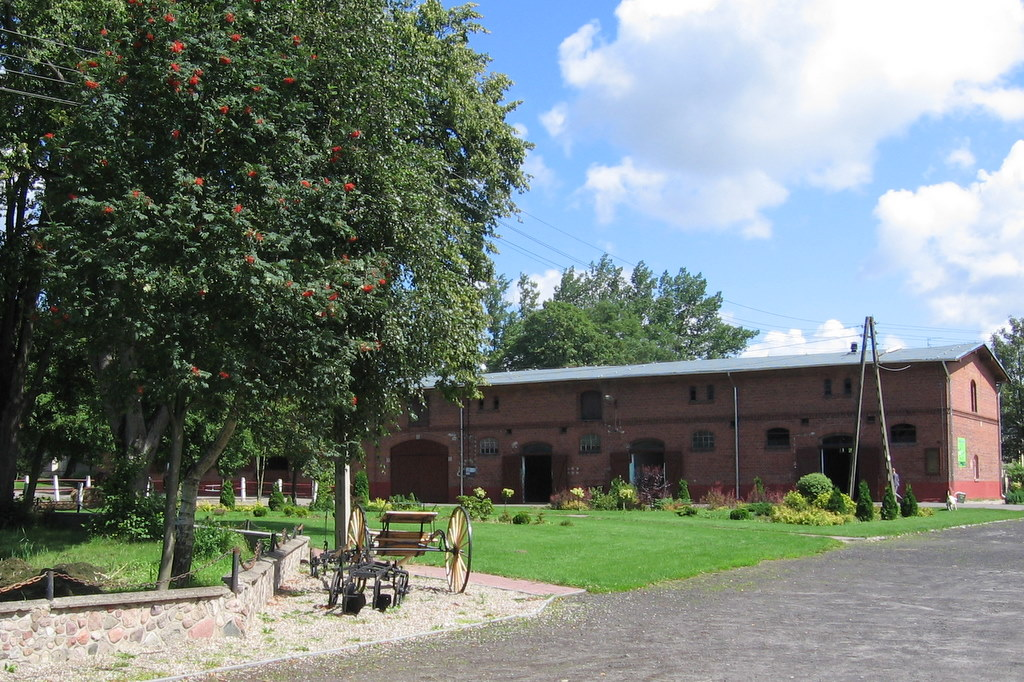
- Stud farm in Nowielice.

- Location within Poland
- Coordinates: 54°4′33″N 15°15′26″E
- Country: Poland
- Voivodeship: West Pomeranian
- County: Gryfice
- Gmina: Trzebiatów
- Population: 385

Nowielice [nɔvjɛˈlit͡sɛ] (German: Neuhof) is a village in the administrative district of Gmina Trzebiatów, within Gryfice County, West Pomeranian Voivodeship, in north-western Poland. It lies approximately 3 km (2 mi) north-west of Trzebiatów, 19 km (12 mi) north of Gryfice, and 86 km (53 mi) north-east of the regional capital Szczecin.

For the history of the region, see History of Pomerania.

The village has a population of 385.
