= Lewice, West Pomeranian Voivodeship =

Lewice
- Village
- Location within Poland
- Coordinates: 54°1′21″N 15°19′15″E
- Country: Poland
- Voivodeship: West Pomeranian
- County: Gryfice
- Gmina: Trzebiatów
- Population: 203

Lewice [lɛˈvit͡sɛ] (German: Lewetzow) is a village in the administrative district of Gmina Trzebiatów, within Gryfice County, West Pomeranian Voivodeship, in north-western Poland. It lies approximately 5 km (3 mi) south-east of Trzebiatów, 15 km (9 mi) north-east of Gryfice, and 83 km (52 mi) north-east of the regional capital Szczecin.

For the history of the region, see History of Pomerania.

The village has a population of 203.
