= Zapolice, West Pomeranian Voivodeship =

Zapolice
- Village
- Location within Poland
- Coordinates: 54°4′45″N 15°10′54″E
- Country: Poland
- Voivodeship: West Pomeranian
- County: Gryfice
- Gmina: Trzebiatów
- Population: 81

Zapolice [zapɔˈlit͡sɛ] (German: Vockenhagen) is a village in the administrative district of Gmina Trzebiatów, within Gryfice County, West Pomeranian Voivodeship, in north-western Poland. It lies approximately 7 km (4 mi) west of Trzebiatów, 19 km (12 mi) north of Gryfice, and 84 km (52 mi) north-east of the regional capital Szczecin.

The village has a population of 81.
