= Mirosławice, West Pomeranian Voivodeship =

Mirosławice
- Village
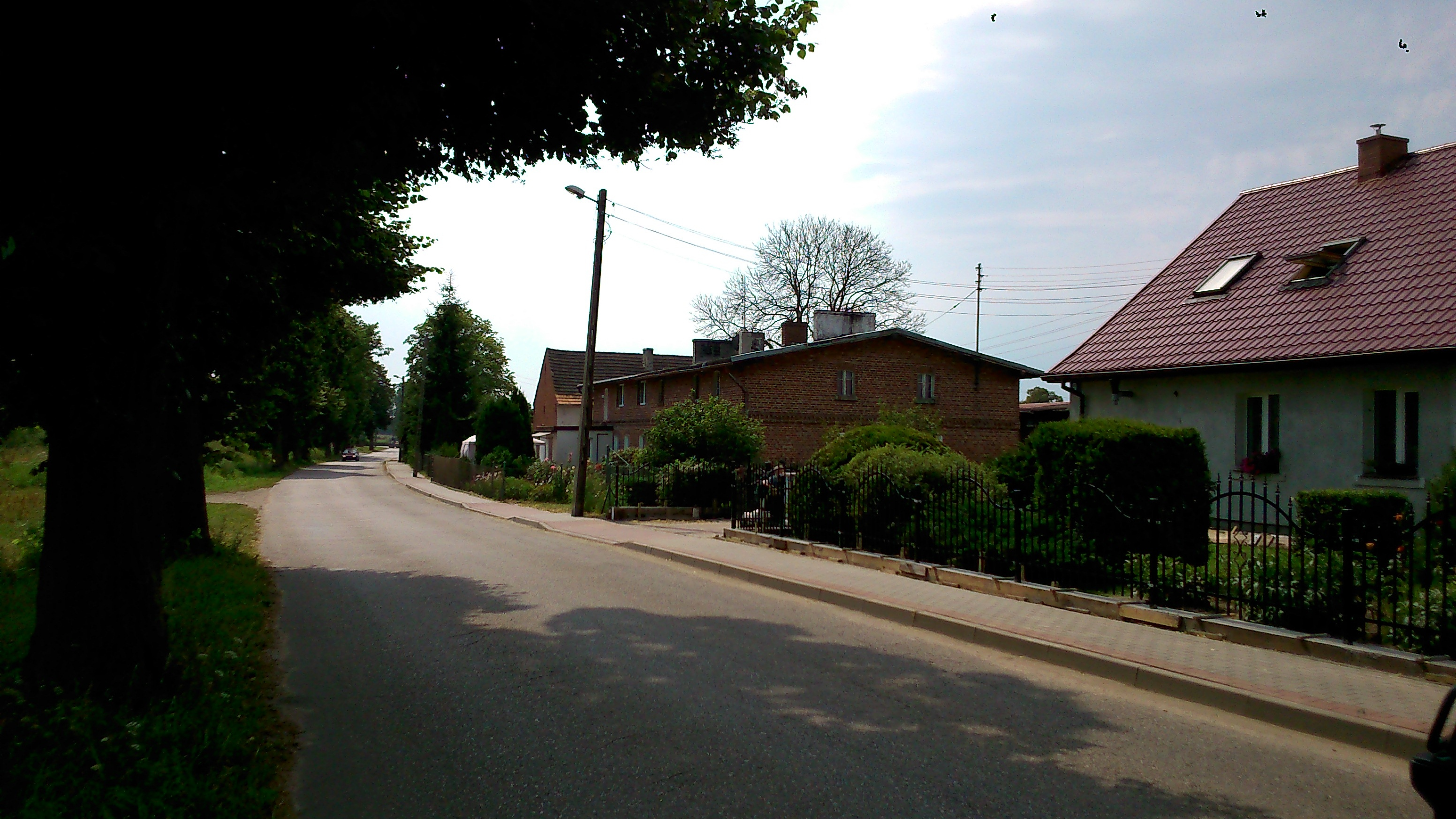

- Location within Poland
- Coordinates: 54°2′33″N 15°16′52″E
- Country: Poland
- Voivodeship: West Pomeranian
- County: Gryfice
- Gmina: Trzebiatów
- Population: 310

Mirosławice [mirɔswaˈvit͡sɛ] (German: Gumminshof) is a village in the administrative district of Gmina Trzebiatów, within Gryfice County, West Pomeranian Voivodeship, in north-western Poland. It lies approximately 2 km (1 mi) south of Trzebiatów, 16 km (10 mi) north of Gryfice, and 84 km (52 mi) north-east of the regional capital Szczecin.

For the history of the region, see History of Pomerania.

The village has a population of 310.
