= Christian Cornelius Jensen =

German classical philologist

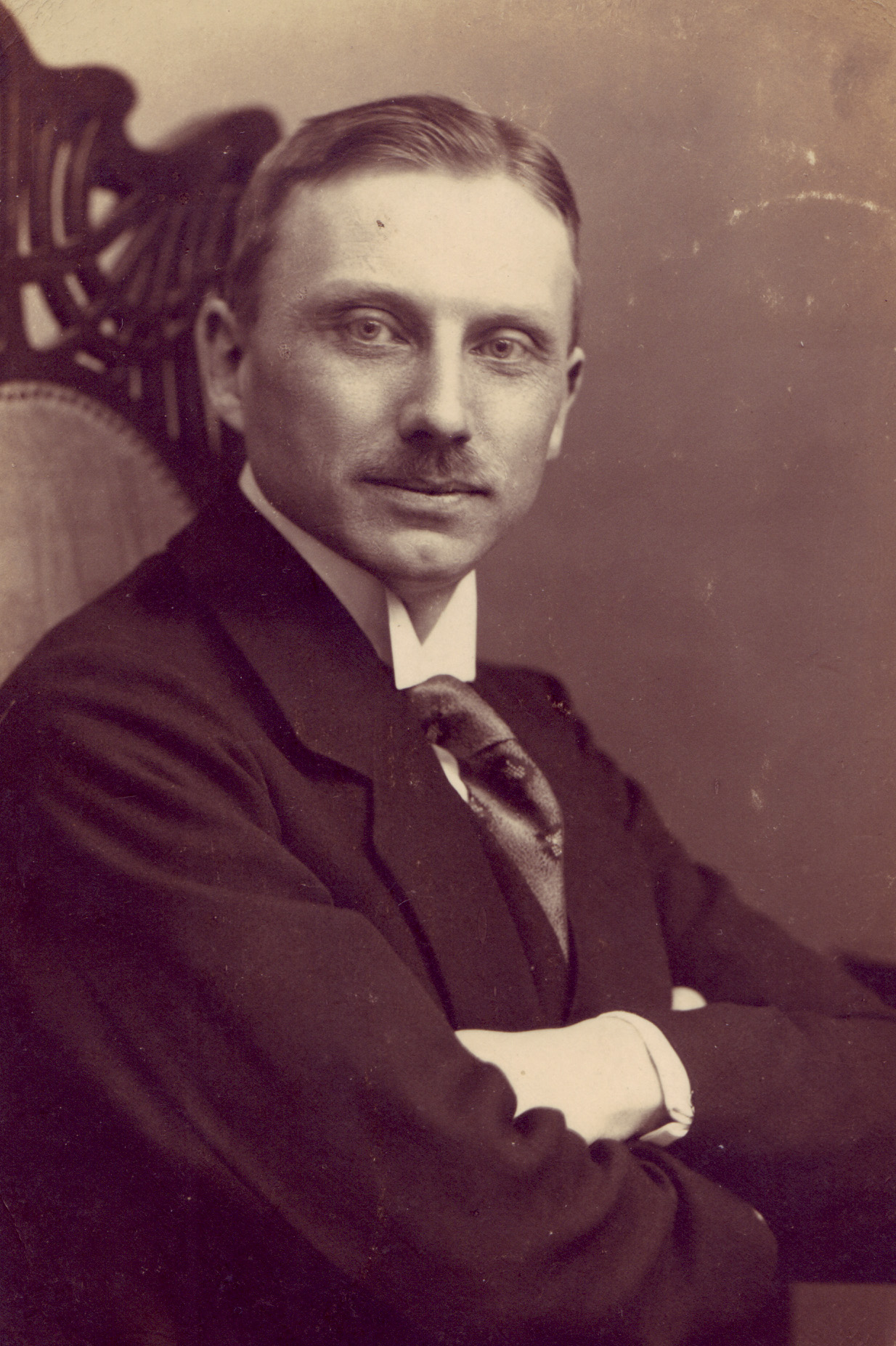
Christian Cornelius Jensen (1919)

Christian Cornelius Jensen (20 July 1883 – 18 September 1940) was a German classical philologist and papyrologist. His father, Christian Jensen (1857–1936), was a local historian and teacher.

Jensen was born in Archsum auf Sylt. He studied classical philology at the universities of Marburg and Kiel, where he was influenced by the work of Siegfried Sudhaus. He worked as a gymnasium teacher in Kiel and Wandsbek, and in 1910 obtained his habilitation for classical philology at the University of Marburg.

In 1912, he became an associate professor at the University of Königsberg, and during the following year, attained a full professorship at the University of Jena. In 1917 he returned as a professor to Königsberg, and later on in his career, worked as a philology professor at the universities of Kiel (from 1921), Bonn (from 1926) and Berlin (from 1937). He died in Berlin.

== Selected works ==
- Philodemi Peri oikonomias qui dicitur libellus, 1906 (edition of Philodemus).
- De Menandri codice Cairensi lectiones novae et coniectanea, 1910 (habilitation thesis), also in: Rheinisches Museum für Philologie. Neue Folge, Band 65 (1910), S. 539–577.
- Hyperidis Orationes sex cum ceterarum fragmentis / post Fridericum Blass papyris denuo collatis edidit Christianus Jensen, 1917 (post Friedrich Blass; edition of Hypereides).
- Neoptolemos und Horaz, 1919 (Abhandlungen der Preussischen Akademie der Wissenschaften: Philosophisch-historische Klasse; 1918, Nr. 14) – Neoptolemus and Horace.
- Philodemos über die Gedichte : fünftes Buch, 1923 – Philodemus; on poems.
- Reliquiae in papyris et membranis servatae, 1929 (edition of Menander).
- Ein neuer Brief Epikurs, 1933 (Abhandlungen der Gesellschaft der Wissenschaften zu Göttingen, Philologisch-Historische Klasse; Folge 3, Nr. 5) – A new writing by Epicurus.
