= Siegfried Sudhaus =

Siegfried Sudhaus (9 July 1863 in Treptow an der Rega – 22 October 1914 near Bixschoote, Belgium) was a German classical philologist, known for his scholarly treatment of Menander and Philodemus.

He studied classical philology at the universities of Bonn and Berlin, and from 1892 worked as a schoolteacher at the municipal gymnasium in Bonn. In 1898 he received his habilitation for classical philology, and afterwards, by way of a travel scholarship from the Deutsches Archäologisches Institut, he embarked on a study trip to Greece. In 1901 he was named a professor of classical philology at the University of Kiel, where in 1912/13 he served as academic rector. Among his better known students at Kiel was papyrologist Christian Cornelius Jensen. As a volunteer in World War I, he died on 22 October 1914 near the town of Bixschoote in Flanders (First Battle of Ypres).

== Published works ==
- Prolegomena ad Philodemi Rhetorica, 1892.
- Philodemi Volumina rhetorica edidit, 1892.
- Philodemi Volumina rhetorica edidit (supplement), 1895.
- Aetna. In: Sammlung wissenschaftlicher Commentare zu griechischen und römischen Schriftstellern, 1898.
- Der Aufbau der Plautinischen Cantica, 1909 – The structure of Plautine canticles.
- Menandri Reliquiae nuper repertae, 1914.
- Menanderstudien, 1914 – Menander studies.
