= Gmina Trzebiatów =

Gmina Trzebiatów Trzebiatów Commune
- Gmina
- Coat of arms
- Interactive map of Gmina Trzebiatów
- Coordinates (Trzebiatów): 54°3′26″N 15°16′43″E
- Country: Poland
- Voivodeship: West Pomeranian
- County: Gryfice
- Seat: Trzebiatów

Area
  - Total: 225.44 km^{2} (87.04 sq mi)

Population (2006)
  - Total: 16,803
  - Density: 74.534/km^{2} (193.04/sq mi)
  - Urban: 10,113
  - Rural: 6,690
- Website: http://www.trzebiatow.pl/

Gmina Trzebiatów is an urban-rural gmina (administrative district) in Gryfice County, West Pomeranian Voivodeship, in northwestern Poland. Its seat is the town of Trzebiatów, which lies approximately 17 kilometres (11 mi) north of Gryfice and 85 km (53 mi) northeast of the regional capital, Szczecin.

The gmina covers an area of 225.44 square kilometres (87.0 sq mi), and as of 2006 its total population was 16,803 (out of which the population of Trzebiatów amounted to 10,113, and the population of the rural part of the gmina was 6,690).

== Villages ==
Apart from the town of Trzebiatów, the gmina contains the villages and settlements of Bieczynko, Bieczyno, Chełm Gryficki, Chomętowo, Gąbin, Gołańcz Pomorska, Gorzysław, Gosław, Kłodkowo, Lewice, Mirosławice, Mrzeżyno, Nowielice, Paliczyno, Roby, Rogowo, Rogozina, Sadlenko, Sadlno, Siemidarżno, Trzebusz, Wlewo, Włodarka and Zapolice.

== Neighbouring gminas ==
Gmina Trzebiatów is bordered by the gminas of Brojce, Gryfice, Karnice, Kołobrzeg, Rewal, Rymań, and Siemyśl.
