= Trzebiatów =

Town in West Pomeranian Voivodeship, Poland

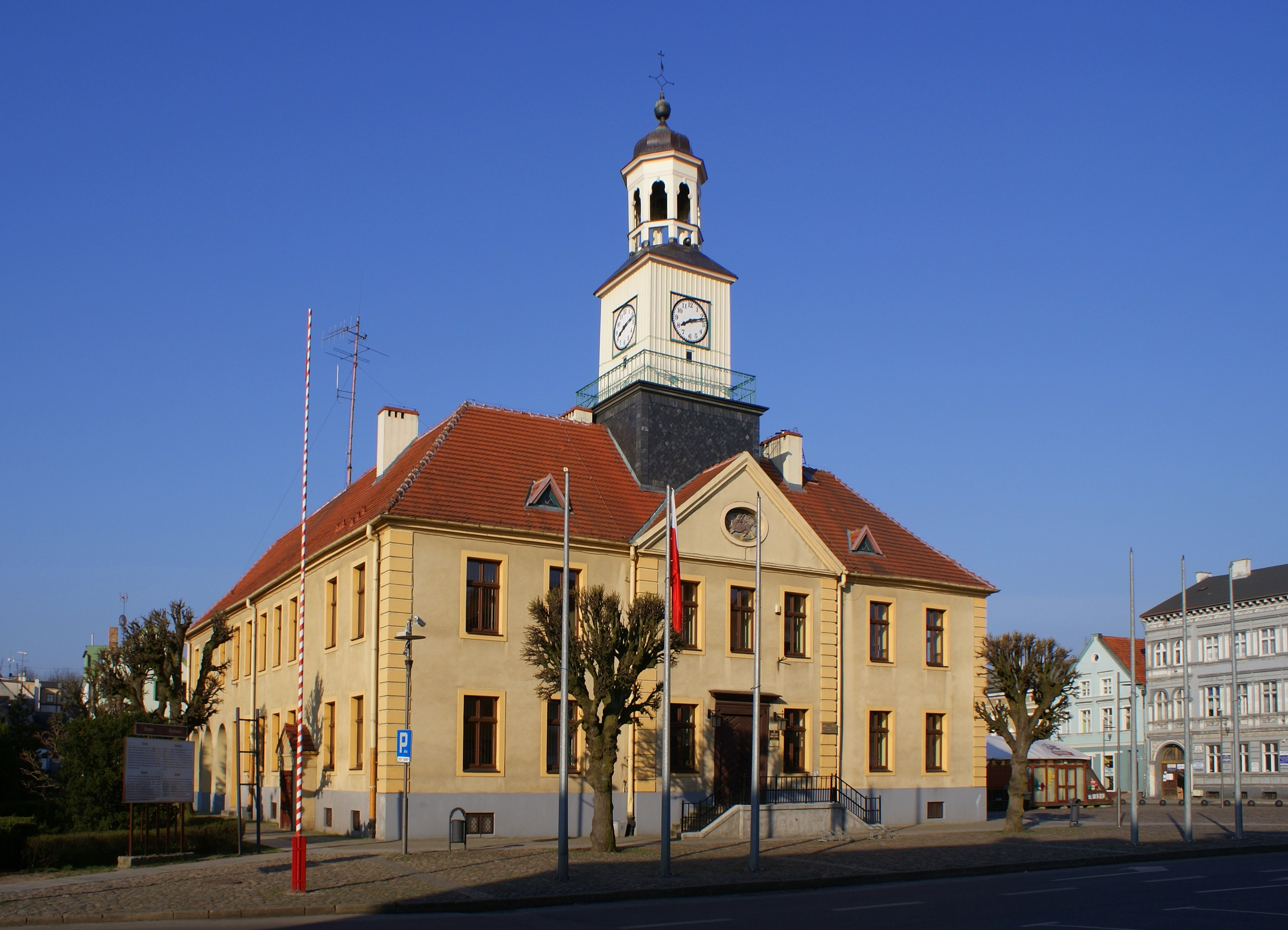
- Town Hall

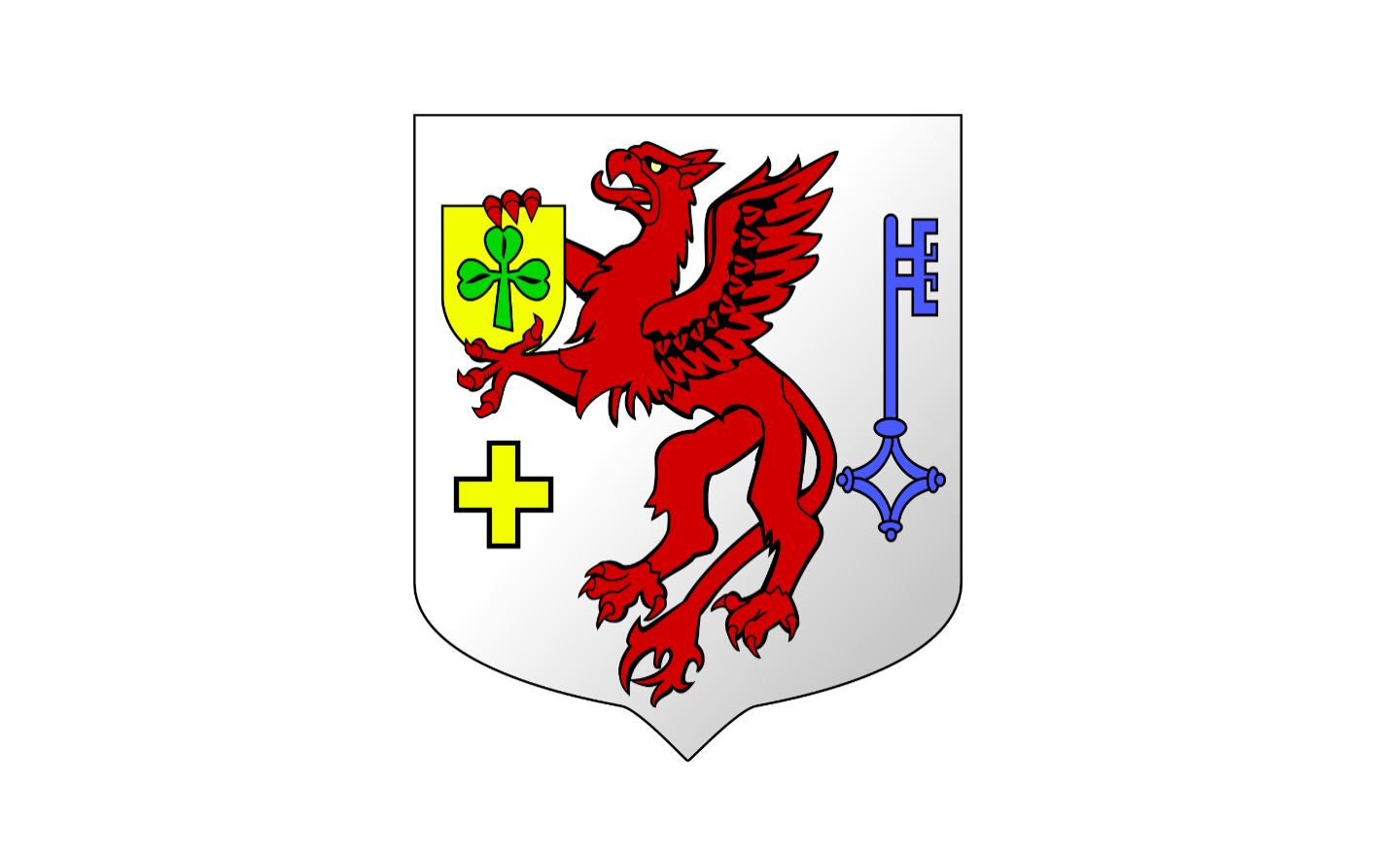
- Flag Coat of arms

- Location within Poland
- Coordinates: 54°3′26″N 15°16′43″E
- Country: Poland
- Voivodeship: West Pomeranian
- County: Gryfice
- Gmina: Trzebiatów
- Established: 9th century
- Town rights: 1277

Government
  - Mayor: Marzena Domaradzka

Area
  - Total: 10.14 km^{2} (3.92 sq mi)

Population (2016)
  - Total: 10,119
  - Density: 997.9/km^{2} (2,585/sq mi)
- Time zone: UTC+1 (CET)
  - Summer (DST): UTC+2 (CEST)
- Postal code: 72-320
- Car plates: ZGY
- Website: http://www.trzebiatow.pl

Trzebiatów (pronounced Tshe-bia-toof [tʂɛˈbjatuf]; Kashubian: Trzébiatowò; German: Treptow an der Rega) is a town in the West Pomeranian Voivodeship, in north-western Poland, with 10,119 inhabitants (2016). Trzebiatów is located on the Rega River in the north-western part of Poland, roughly 9 kilometers south of the Baltic coast.

The Old Town of Trzebiatów is registered as a protected historical monument of Poland. It contains several Gothic churches, defensive walls and towers, a preserved market square, and a palace.

== History ==
=== Middle Ages ===
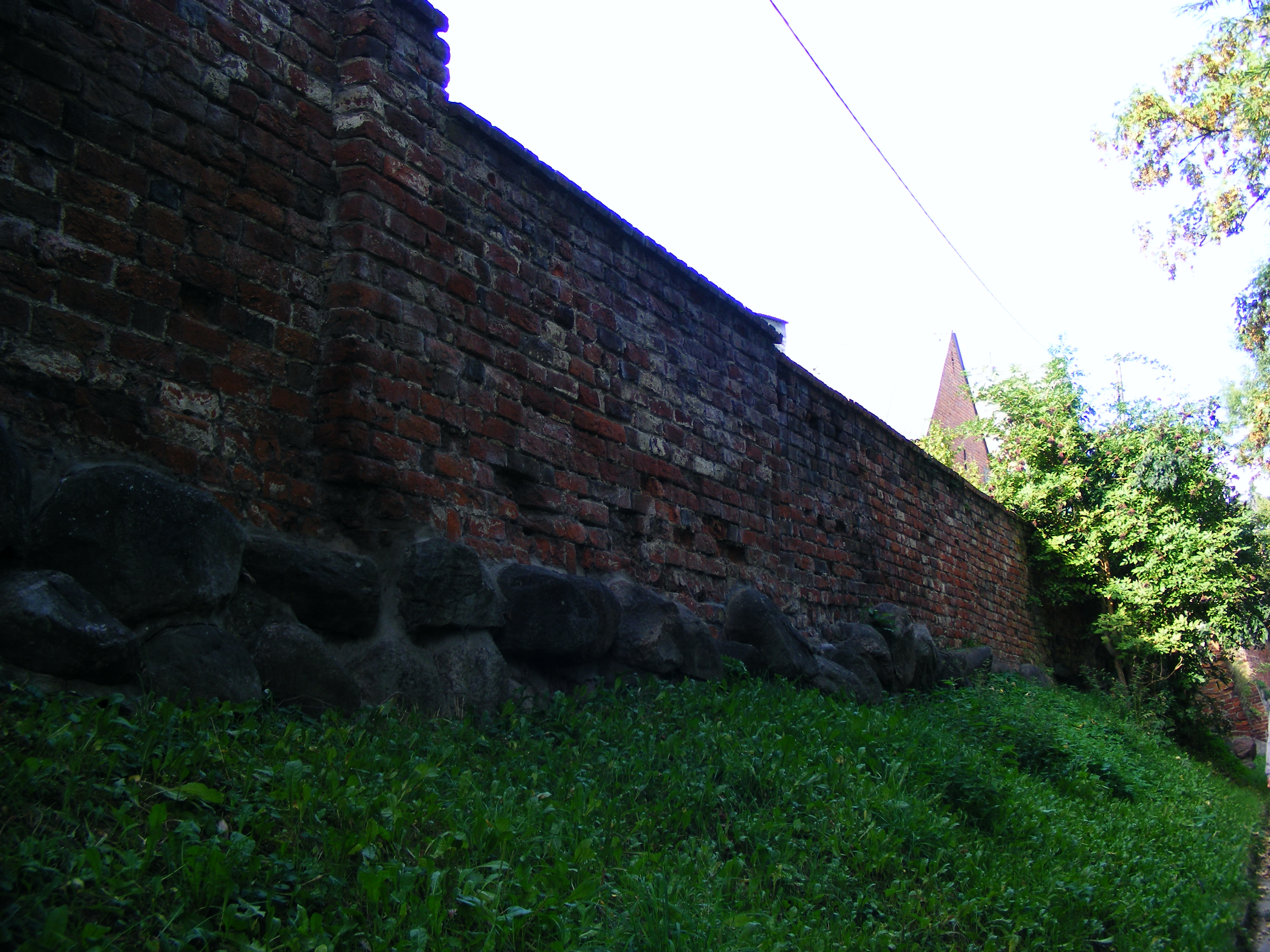
Medieval defensive walls of Trzebiatów

The lower Rega area around Gryfice and Trzebiatów was the site of a West Slavic Lechitic gród (fortified settlement) in the 9th century. The territory became part of the emerging Polish state under Mieszko I around 967. It was part of the Duchy of Pomerania, which separated itself from Poland as a result of the fragmentation of Poland. The first recorded mention of the town comes from 1170 when the Pomeranian Duke Casimir I granted a few villages and oversight of a church in the town to settlers from Lund in Sweden.

In the early 13th century Trzebiatów became the seat of Duchess Anastasia of Greater Poland, who rebuilt the old castle into her residence. In 1224, Anastasia brought Premonstratensian nuns to the town. In the first half of the 13th century, German settlers invited by the Pomeranian Duke Barnim I began to settle in the area. In 1277, this settlement received town privileges under the Lübeck Law. In 1288 Duke Mestwin II granted several villages to the local monastery, with these grantings confirmed by Władysław I Łokietek in 1298.

In 1416, the town became part of the Hanseatic League, then served as an important trade post and developed architecturally, with a typical Brick Gothic-style influence. It had trading connections with major cities such as Gdańsk and Copenhagen.

=== Modern era ===
In 1504, Johannes Bugenhagen moved to the town and became Rector of the local school. On 13 December 1534 a diet was assembled in the town, where the Dukes Barnim XI and Philip I as well as the nobility officially introduced Lutheranism to Pomerania, against the vote of Erasmus von Manteuffel-Arnhausen, Prince-Bishop of Cammin. In the following month Bugenhagen drafted the new church order, founding the Pomeranian Lutheran church (today's Pomeranian Evangelical Church).

As a dowager, Sophia of Schleswig-Holstein-Sonderburg (1579–1658), widow of Philip II, Duke of Pomerania, lived in Treptow. Sophia's dower was a former nunnery, which she converted into a palace. While in Swedish service and thereafter Duke Francis Henry of Saxe-Lauenburg spent a lot of time with Duchess dowager Sophia in Treptow. Sophia's and Francis Henry's fathers were cousins. On 13 December 1637 Francis Henry and Marie Juliane of Nassau-Siegen (1612–1665) married in Treptow. Their first child was born in Treptow in 1640. Francis Henry also served Sophia as administrator of the estates pertaining to her dower.

During the Thirty Years' War, in 1630, the town was besieged by forces of the Holy Roman Empire. In 1637 Bogusław XIII died leaving the Pomeranian ducal house extinct. At this point the duchy came under Swedish occupation with the Brandenburgian electors claiming succession in Pomerania. After the Thirty Years War the town became part of Brandenburg-Prussia in the Peace of Westphalia of 1648. It was part of the province of Pomerania. During the Seven Years' War, the town was occupied by Russia.

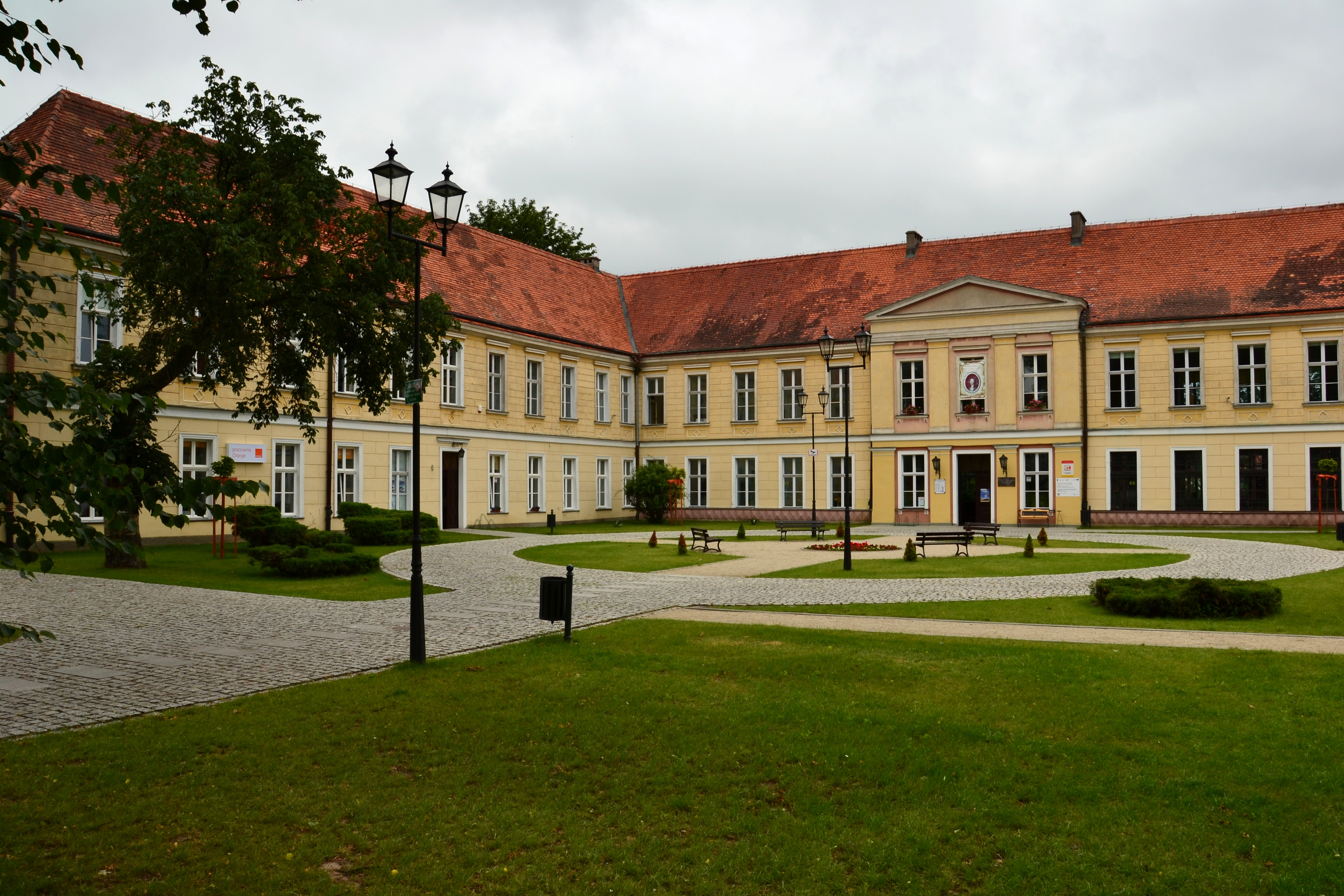
Palace in Trzebiatów, former home of the Polish writer Maria Wirtemberska

In 1750 the local palace was refurbished in classicist style for General Frederick Eugene of Württemberg, who resided there – with interruptions – until 1763. In the late 18th century the Polish noblewoman and writer Maria Wirtemberska née Czartoryska resided at the palace, and her early works and translations were created here. The painter Jan Rustem visited her several times, and his paintings were part of the palace's art collection. The palace now houses a State public library, founded in 1946 and named after Maria Wirtemberska née Czartoryska since 1999.

In 1806 the town was captured and then occupied by France. From 1871 to 1945 it formed part of the German Reich.

=== 20th century ===
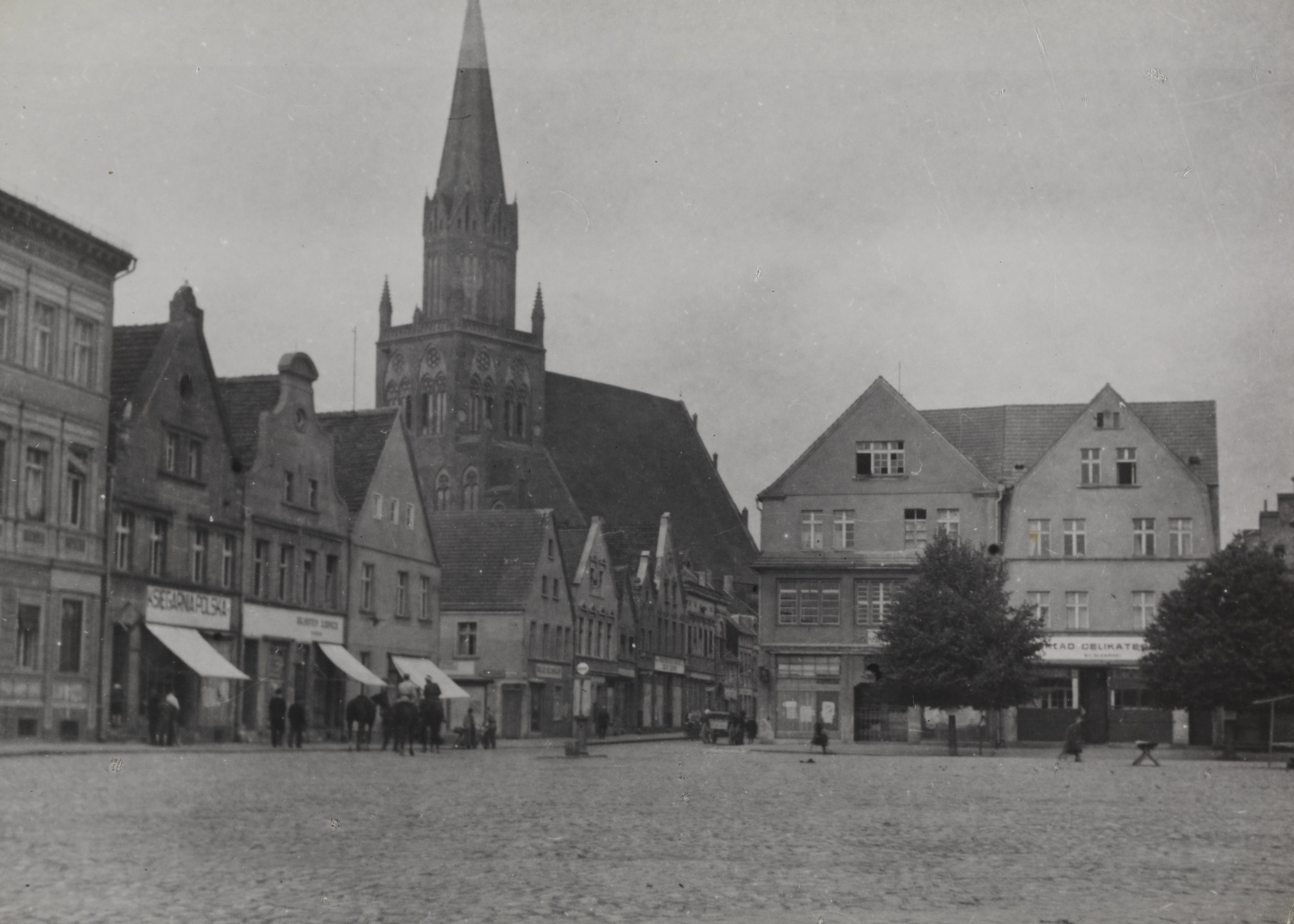
Market Square in 1945

During World War II, in February 1945, the German-perpetrated death march of Allied prisoners-of-war from the Stalag XX-B POW camp passed through the town. Near the end of the war, in February 1945, despite the approaching front, the authorities did not permit the evacuation of the town's population. It was not until March 4 that the order to evacuate was issued, the day after remnants of the army had retreated from the town, leaving the civilian population to fend for itself. Allied Polish and Russian forces then entered the town, and afterwards it became again part of Poland, although with a Soviet-installed communist regime, which stayed in power until the Fall of Communism in the 1980s. The town's German population was expelled, and the town was resettled with Poles, in accordance with Potsdam Agreement.

Since 1 January 1999, the town has been within West Pomerania Voivodeship, upon its formation from the former Szczecin and Koszalin Voivodeships.

== Culture ==
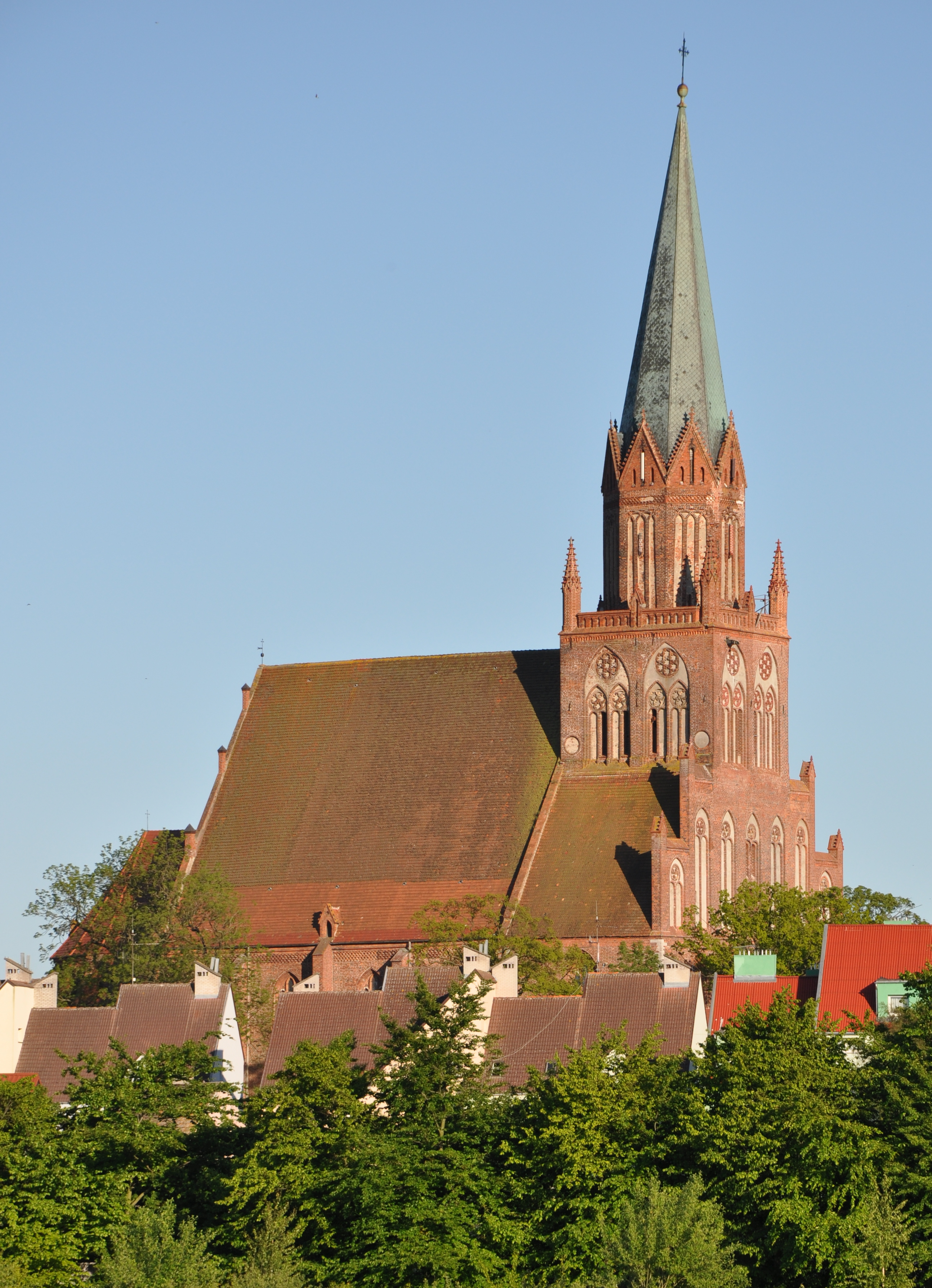
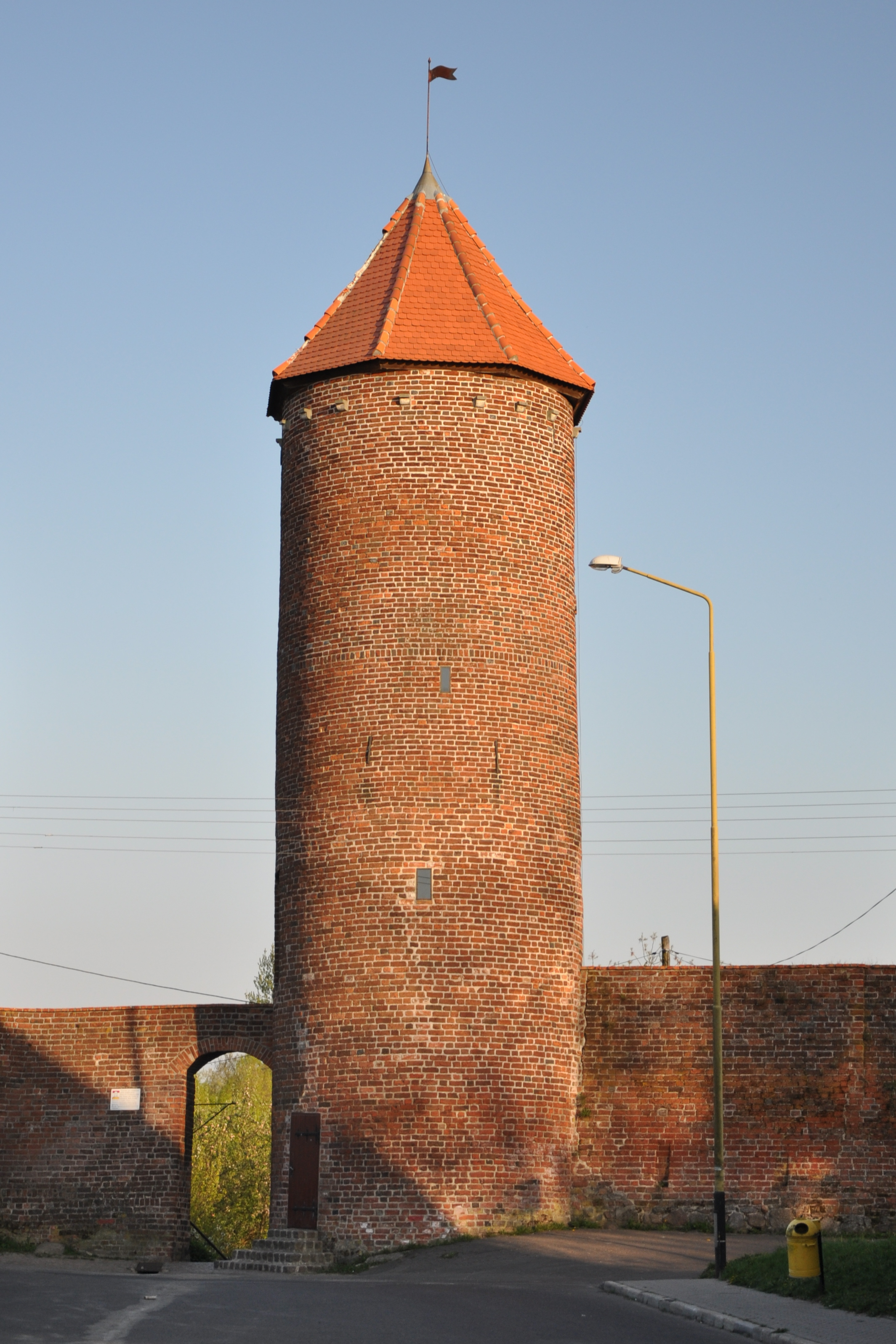
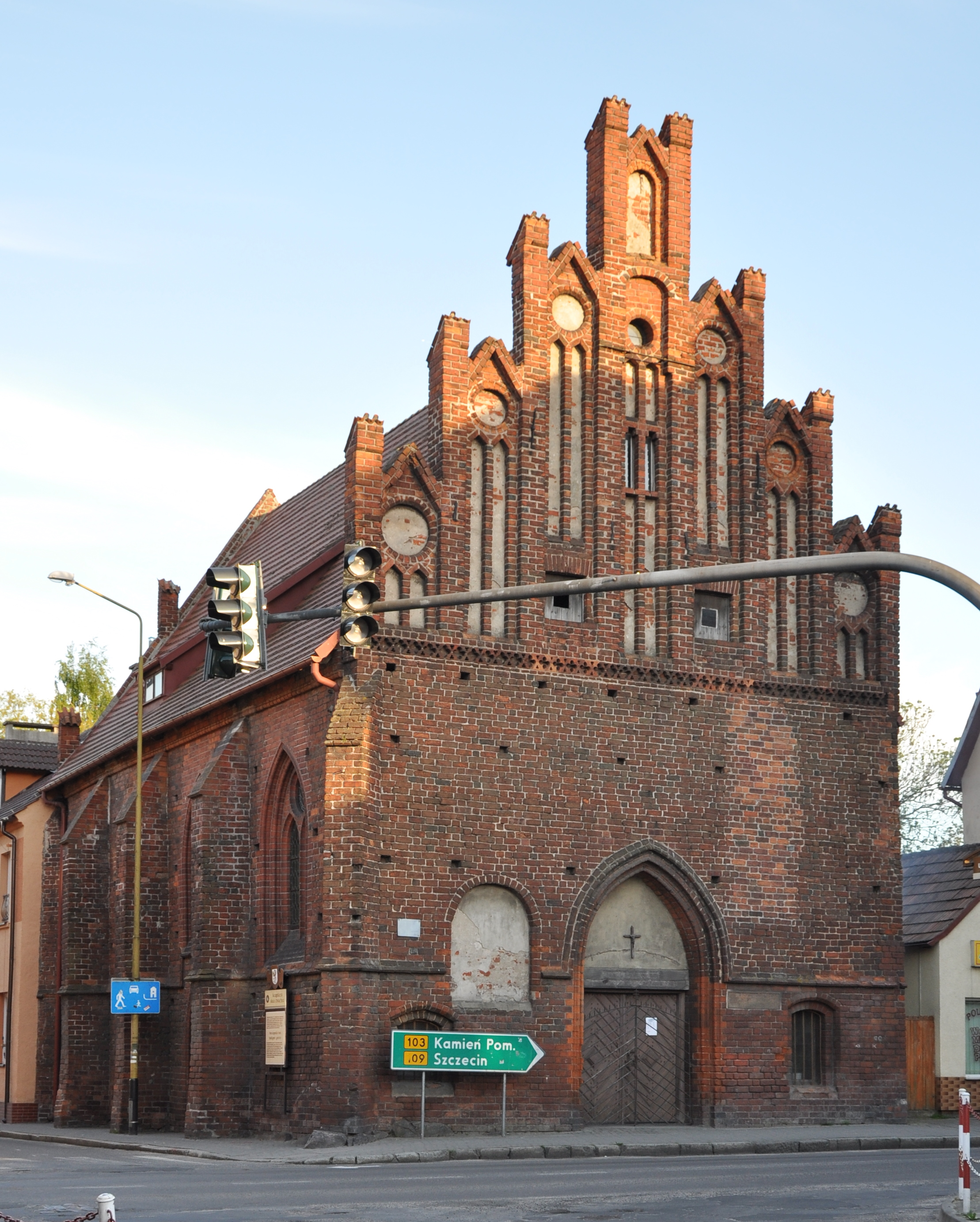
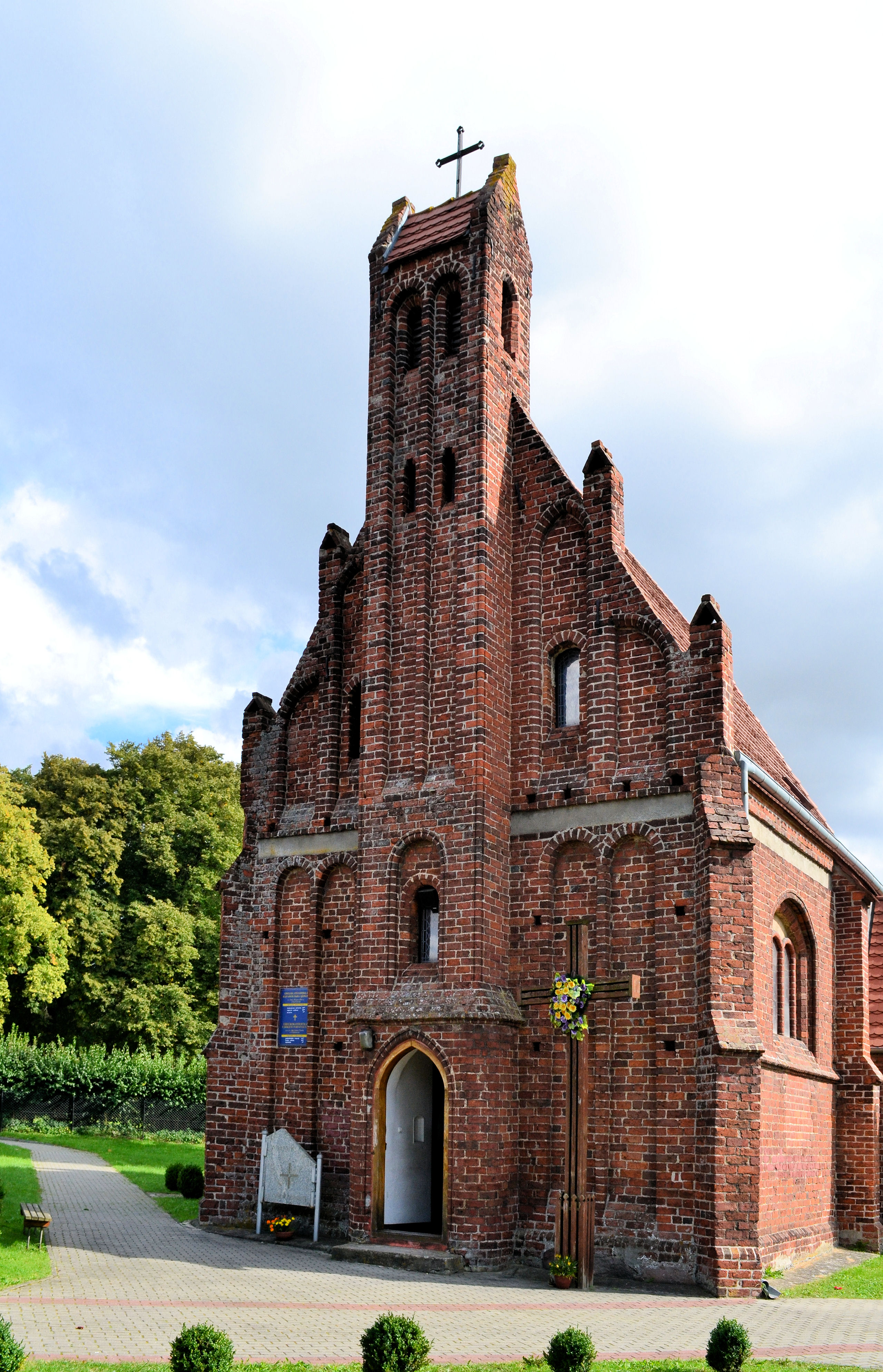
Medieval architecture of Trzebiatów, from the left: Saint Mary's Maternity Church, Kaszana Tower, Holy Spirit Chapel, Saint Gertrude's Chapel

Trzebiatów's Day of the Buckwheat is a celebration during the first week of August. It is held in memory of the day when the town guard mistakenly dropped a hot bowl of buckwheat meal on invaders from the nearby town of Gryfice, alarming the whole town and ultimately saving it. Inhabitants of Trzebiatów celebrate that event with dances, concerts, competitions and by eating cereal with ham and bacon.

== Demographics ==
Historical population

Year	Pop.	±%
1871	6,747	—
1880	7,052	+4.5%
1890	6,258	−11.3%
1900	6,645	+6.2%
1910	8,484	+27.7%

Year	Pop.	±%
1925	8,149	−3.9%
1933	8,962	+10.0%
1950	4,312	−51.9%
1960	7,485	+73.6%
2010	10,131	+35.4%

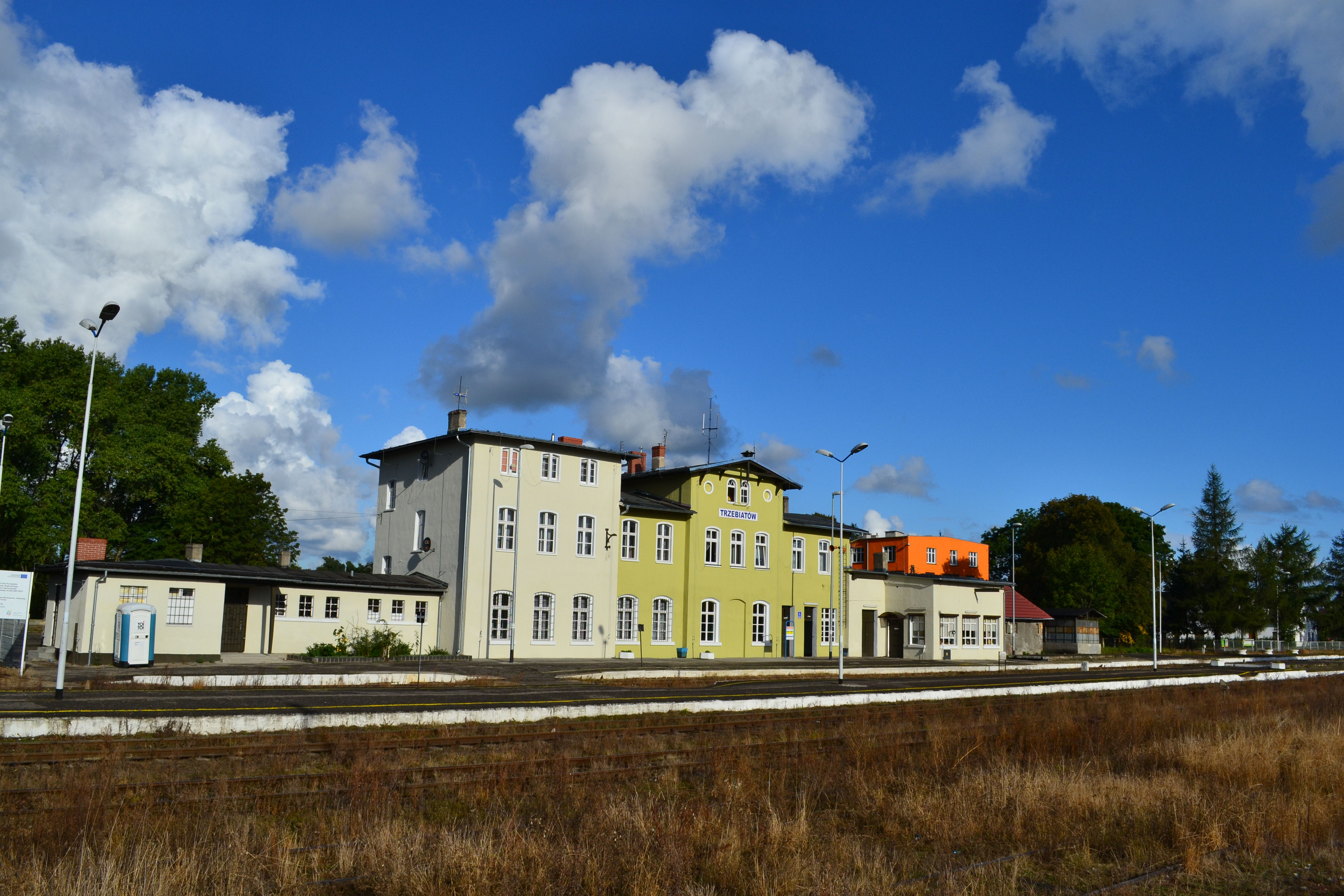
Trzebiatów train station

== Notable people ==
- Johannes Aepinus (1499–1553), theologian and reformer
- Johannes Bugenhagen (1505–1521), Pomeranian reformer, rector at Treptow city school
- Maria Wirtemberska (1768–1864), Polish noblewoman, writer and translator
- Johann Gustav Droysen (1808–1884) a German historian
- Ferdinand von Arnim (1814–1866) a German architect and watercolour-painter
- Gustav Queck (1822–1897) a German educator and classical philologist
- Marcus Kalisch (1828–1885), Jewish scholar, a pioneer in the critical study of the Old Testament
- Siegfried Sudhaus (1863–1914), German classical philologist
- Sławomir Krawczyk (1963), Polish cyclist
- Adam Bodnar (born 1977), Polish lawyer, educator, human rights activist, 7th Polish Ombudsman, Minister of Justice
- Bartosz Ława (born 1979), Polish footballer, over 300 pro games

=== Nobility ===
- Frederick I of Württemberg (1754–1816), King of Württemberg
- Duke Louis of Württemberg (1756–1817) second son of Friedrich II Eugen, Duke of Württemberg
- Duke Ferdinand Frederick Augustus of Württemberg (1763–1834) the fifth son of Frederick II Eugene, Duke of Württemberg
- Duchess Frederica of Württemberg (1765–1785) daughter of Frederick II Eugene, Duke of Württemberg
- Duchess Elisabeth of Württemberg (1767–1790) Archduchess of Austria by marriage to Archduke Francis of Austria.

== Twin towns and sister cities ==
Trzebiatów is twinned with:

- Brwinów, Poland
- Großräschen, Germany
- Istebna, Poland
- Sjöbo, Sweden
- Wandlitz, Germany

== See also ==
- History of education in Trzebiatów
- Architecture in Trzebiatów
