= Siege of Kolberg (Seven Years' War) =

1758-61 Russian offensive during the Seven Years' War

Coordinates: 54°11′00″N 15°35′00″E

During the Seven Years' War, the Prussian-held town of Kolberg in Brandenburg-Prussian Pomerania (now Kołobrzeg) was besieged by Russian forces three times. The first two sieges, in late 1758 and from 26 August to 18 September 1760, were unsuccessful. A final and successful siege took place from August to December 1761. In the sieges of 1760 and 1761, the Russian forces were supported by Swedish auxiliaries.

As a consequence of the fall of the city, Prussia lost its last major port on the Baltic Coast, while at the same time the Russian forces were able to take winter quarters in Pomerania. However, when Empress Elizabeth of Russia died only weeks after the Russian victory, her successor, Peter III of Russia, made peace and returned Kolberg to Prussia.

== First siege (1758) ==
Siege of Kolberg (1758)
- Part of the Third Silesian War (Seven Years' War)
Date	4 October – 1 November 1758
Location	Kolberg, Prussia
Result	Prussian victory

Belligerents
Russia	(Kingdom of Prussia) Prussia

Commanders and leaders
General-Major Johann Palmenbach	Heinrich Sigismund von der Heyde

Strength
5,000 men, 20 guns	700

Casualties and losses
Unknown	Unknown

A first siege in 1758 was repelled by the Prussian defenders. Russian Count Fermor was ordered to expel the Prussian forces commanded by Count Dohna from Pomerania, take Kolberg and establish winter quarters in Brandenburg-Prussian Pomerania. Fermor reluctantly pursued his objectives since he regarded full achievement nearly impossible.

Fermor dispatched 4,000 troops and 20 artillery pieces, commanded by General-Major Johann Palmenbach to siege Kolberg, defended by 700 regulars and a levy, commanded by Heinrich Sigismund von der Heyde who had just upgraded the defense works and stocked supplies.

Siege was laid on 4 October. Though Russian reinforcements brought up Palmenbach's strength to 5,000 the following month, heavy rain and storms rendered successful construction of siege works impossible. In addition, 27 Russian warships arrived to assist the siege from the seaside, yet throughout October, storms wrecked 21, and none came close enough to participate. The siege was lifted on 1 November after several unsuccessful attacks.

== Second siege (1760) ==
Siege of Kolberg (1760)
- Part of the Third Silesian War (Seven Years' War)
Date	27 August – 18 September 1760
Location	Kolberg, Prussia
Result	Prussian victory

Belligerents
Russia; Sweden	(Kingdom of Prussia) Prussia

Commanders and leaders
Army: I. V. Demidov; Fleet: Admiral Zakhar Mishukov	(Kingdom of Prussia) Colonel Heinrich Sigismund von der Heyde (defense) (Kingdom of Prussia) Major-General Paul von Werner (relief)

Strength
Army: 8,000; Fleet: 26+ ships	3,800 (relief force)

Casualties and losses
600	22 killed 47 wounded

The Russian forces had the objective to establish their 1760/61 winter quarters near the lower Oder for which securing the fortress of Kolberg was necessary. In July, a Russian expedition commanded by Gottlob Heinrich Tottleben advanced into Brandenburg-Prussian Pomerania but, upon reaching the Rega valley, was ordered to the Silesian battlefields.

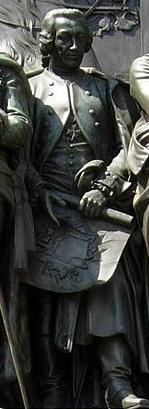
Statue of Heyde with a map of Kolberg, Berlin

On 27 August, Kolberg was bombarded from the sea by the entire Russian Baltic fleet: 21 ships of line, three frigates and three bomb vessels, all of which had arrived the day before. On 29 August, they were joined by six ships of line and three frigates of their Swedish allies. Some 8,000 troops of Oberzeugmeister I. V. Demidov were deployed and started constructing siege works on 6 September, covered by cavalry units. The Prussian defense was commanded by Colonel Heinrich Sigismund von der Heyde.

While the siege was sluggish, Frederick II of Prussia ordered a force of 3,800 commanded by Major-General Paul von Werner to disengage from the battles in Silesia and instead relieve Kolberg, which was some 340 kilometres (210 mi) to the North. After a 13-day ride, Werner's force arrived at the Russian lines on 18 September and attacked immediately. A successful skirmish made the besiegers believe they were dealing with a force of up to 20,000 and led them to withdraw on board of their vessels. The Swedish and Russian ships left on 20 and 23 September, respectively. Russian casualties amounted to 600 troops.

After the battle, Frederick promoted both Werner and Heyde to lieutenant-general.

== Third siege (1761) ==
Siege of Kolberg (1761)
- Part of the Third Silesian War (Seven Years' War)
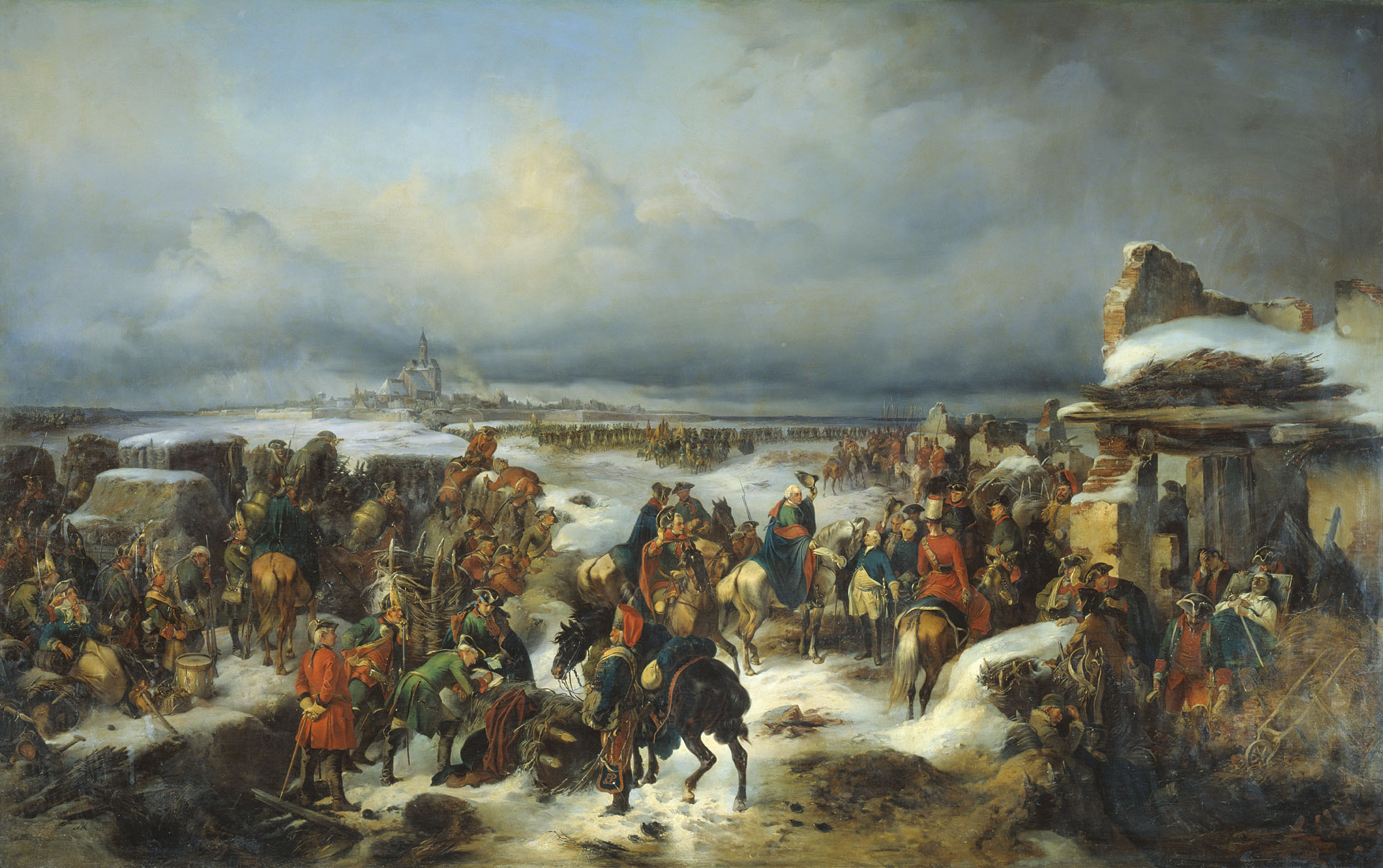
- Fall of Kolberg by Alexander Kotzebue
Date	24 August – 16 December 1761 (Note: 13 August – 5 December OS)
Location	Kolberg, Prussia
Result	Russo-Swedish victory

Belligerents
Russia; Sweden	(Kingdom of Prussia) Prussia

Commanders and leaders
Army: Pyotr Rumyantsev; Ivan Möller-Sakomelsky; Alexander Suvorov (Note: Acted on Prussian communications.); Fleet: Andrey Polyansky; unknown	Heinrich Sigismund von der Heyde; Friedrich Eugen of Württemberg; Dubislav Friedrich von Platen

Strength
Army: 22,000 men, 70 guns; Fleet: 33 ships, 1,738 cannons (Note: Russian squadron: 24 ships, 1,300 cannons.; Swedish detachment: 9 ships, 438 cannons.); 7,000 men (landing party)	31,000–36,000 in all (Note: Including detachments defending the lines of communication with Berlin.); 20,000 participated (Note: Without reinforcements, 16,000: that is 4,000-Kolberg garrison and 12,000 men of Frederick II Eugene's corps, stationed in a fortified camp.) 140 garrison guns

Casualties and losses
Unknown	5,275+ men & 145 guns captured, unknown number of dead/wounded (Note: This also includes General Charles-Emmanuel de Warnery, 20 food wagons, 135 officers.: Colonel Bibikov's attack: 500 men and 2 guns captured.; Brigadier Nevedomsky's attack: 7 guns taken away.; Fortification XXXV: (Note: See the schematic map provided in the section. The mentioned fortification covers a narrow passage to Błotnica through the eponymous stream and is located in the lower left corner — a little southwest of the passage. n.b.: Kolberg itself is labelled "A".) Entire garrison became prisoners.; Treptow an der Rega: 59 officers and 1,840 soldiers taken prisoner.; Capitulation: 76 officers, about 2,800 soldiers, 136 guns, and many cannonballs or bullets captured.; 2,929 men, 146 guns, 28 standards and colours captured)

Tottleben, who had commanded the Russian spring campaigns in Pomerania the year before, committed treason and revealed to Frederick the Russian plans to besiege Kolberg again in 1761. Once Frederick was aware of that, he ordered supplies to the fortress and withdrew prince Friedrich Eugen of Württemberg from the Swedish front in Mecklenburg.

Württemberg reached Kolberg on 4 July, and he commanded a reinforced defense force of 12,000 troops. Russian commander Lieutenant General Pyotr Alexandrovich Rumyantsev-Zadunaisky, commanding a weaker force, took quarter in nearby Köslin (now Koszalin) on 23 June, awaiting reinforcements. Lieutenant Colonel Ivan Ivanovich Möller-Sakomelsky was commander of the artillery under Rumyantsev, and was later entrusted with organizing and commanding one of the army's first light infantry units. Vice Admiral Andrey Ivanovich Polyansky's squadron carried out the blockade from the sea. It included 24 ships, 1,300 guns and 7,000 marines. There was also allied with Russia a Swedish detachment of 9 ships and 438 guns. Württemberg's plan to attack Rumyantsev as long as the odds favoured Prussia was cancelled by Frederick as too risky. After 3,000 Russian troops had reinforced Rumyantsev in mid-August, he laid siege to Kolberg on 22 August.

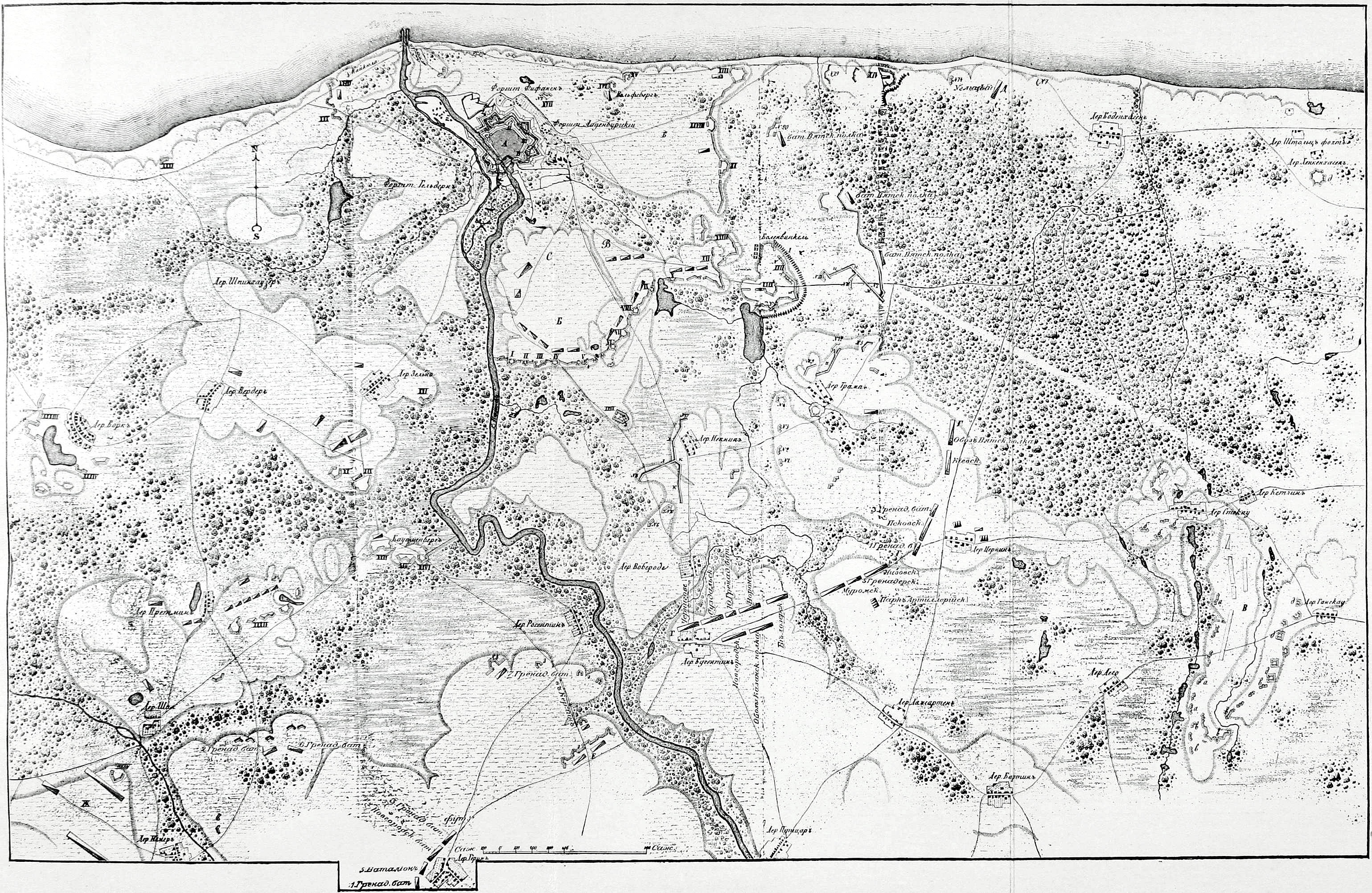
Schematic map to the article "Kolberg". The siege of 1761. Sytin Military Encyclopedia (St. Petersburg, 1911–1915)

Twenty-three Russian warships assisted Rumyantsev; an additional eight Swedish warships joined later. The town was continuously bombarded from 25 August to 25 September. On 18 September, Rumyantsev stormed Württemberg's defense outside the town, suffering 3,000 casualties with little ground gained. He then changed his strategy from preparing storms to cutting off Kolberg from supplies.

On 30 September, Kolberg was reinforced by several thousand Prussian troops commanded by Dubislav Friedrich von Platen. With the reinforcements, the fortress was defended by nearly 20,000 Prussians. Rumyantsev, who lost naval support on 9 October when the Russian warships sailed home because of bad weather, was reinforced by part of Alexander Borisovich Buturlin's army the same month. His cavalry, commanded by Gustav Berg, cut off Prussian communication lines, countered excursions of Württemberg's 2,700 horse and captured at least four of their units.

As the Prussians were running out of supplies, Platen's force was ordered to Berlin in late October. In November, Württemberg abandoned Kolberg, broke through the Russian lines to reunite with Platen, and then attempted to rout Rumyantsev from the rear. When Platen and Württemberg did not succeed, Platen departed as ordered, and Württemberg tried several times to force his way back into the fortress. On 12 December, the Russian forces halted his final attempt at Spie, southwest of Kolberg, inflicting 1,000 casualties on his force. Württemberg's remaining 8,000 troops thereupon retreated to Stettin.

On 16 December, Kolberg capitulated to Rumyantsev, enabling his forces to take winter quarter in Brandenburg-Prussian Pomerania. Another Russian achievement was that Rumyantsev's siege kept Platen's forces in check, whom hard-pressed Frederick had expected to aid him in Silesia once Kolberg was relieved. By the time Platen escaped the pocket, the setbacks Frederick suffered in Silesia were already irreversible, thus Platen was ordered to Berlin instead to support his Saxon ally.

The siege of Kolberg of 1761 was an important milestone in the development of Russian military art. Here Rumyantsev pioneered a new tactic — the action of troops in battalion (regimental) columns, combined with a scattered formation of jaegers.

== Aftermath ==
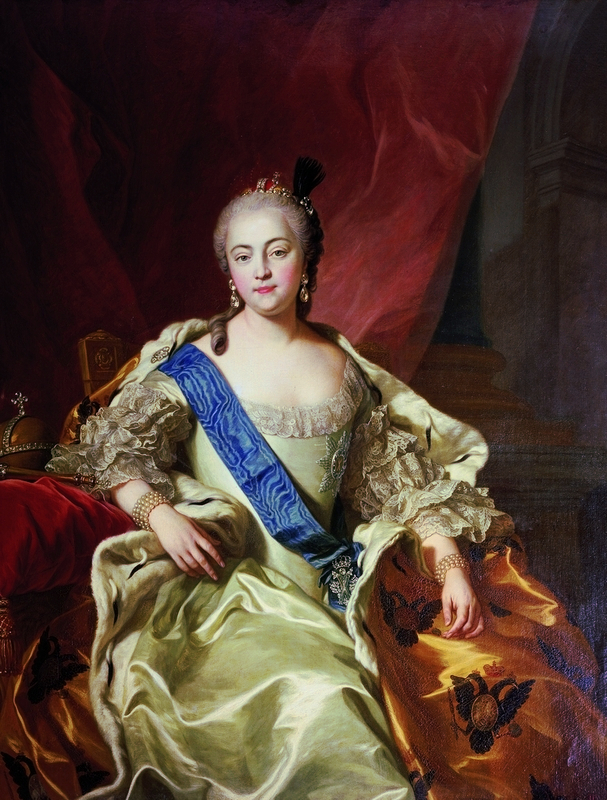
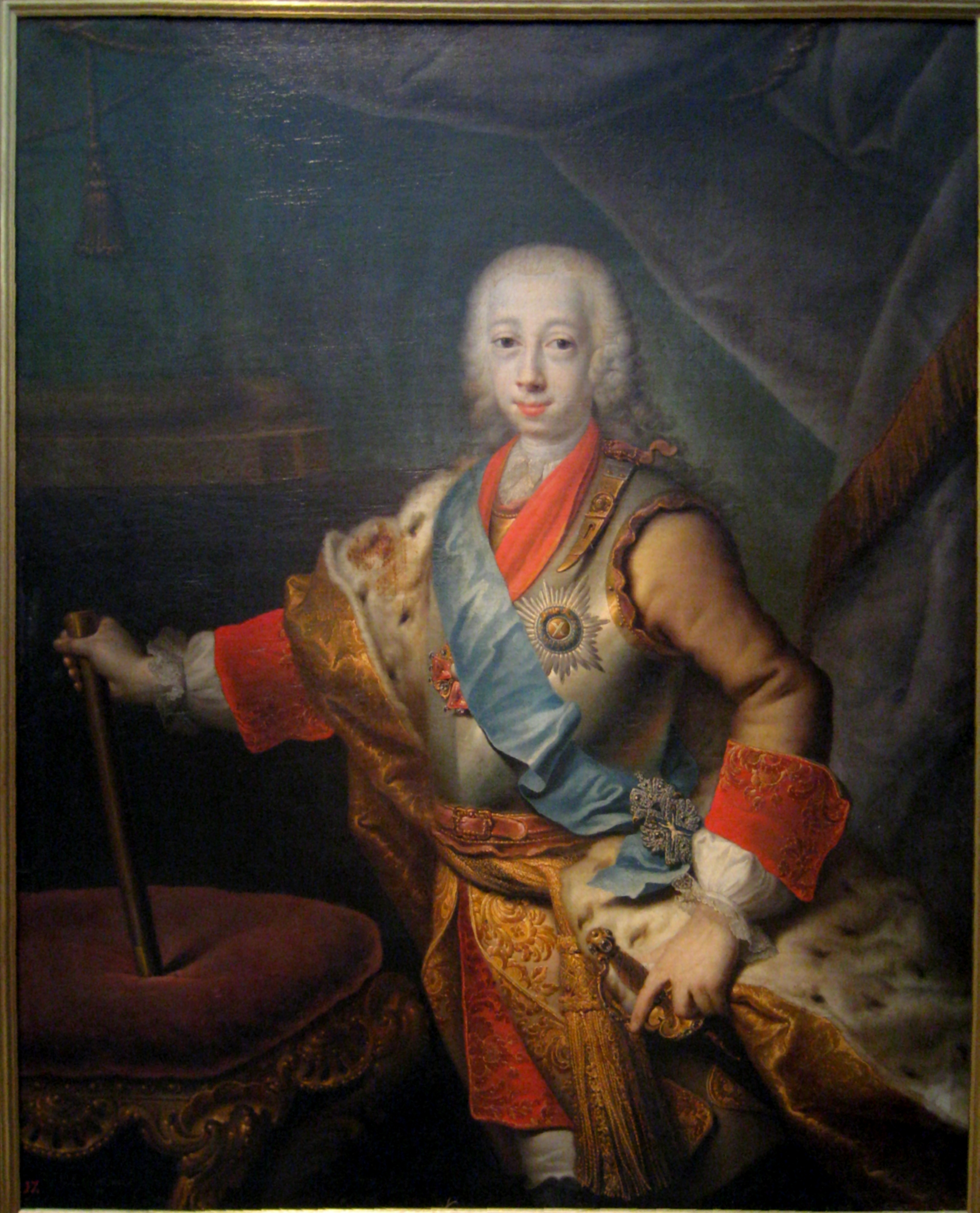
Elizabeth (left) and Peter III of Russia (right)

By the time of the sieges, Russian Tsarina Elizabeth of Russia was suffering from an illness, which led to her death on 25 December 1761 (OS) or 5 January 1762 (NS). Elizabeth was succeeded by her nephew, Peter III of Russia, an admirer of Frederick partially raised in Berlin.

Peter, who had opposed Russia's involvement in the Seven Years' War, ceased the hostilities with Prussia at once and, by the terms of the Treaty of Saint Petersburg, returned to her all occupied territories (including Kolberg) as well as providing Frederick with 20,000 troops.

Deprived of their Russian ally, the Austrian House of Habsburg was unwilling to continue the war on its own and returned to the status quo ante with Prussia in the Treaty of Hubertusburg.

== See also ==
- Pomerania during the Early Modern Age

== Sources ==
=== Bibliography ===
- Buchholz, Werner, ed. (2002). Pommern (in German). Siedler. ISBN 3-88680-780-0.
- Burk, Kurt (1995). Handbuch zur Geschichte der Festungen des historischen deutschen Ostens. Biblio. ISBN 3-7648-2454-9.
- Jaques, Tony, ed. (2007). Dictionary of Battles and Sieges: A Guide to 8,500 Battles from Antiquity Through the Twenty-first Century, Volume II: F-O. Greenwood Publishing Group. ISBN 978-0-313-33538-9.
- Stone, David R. (2006). A military history of Russia: from Ivan the Terrible to the war in Chechnya. Greenwood Publishing Group. ISBN 0-275-98502-4.
- Szabo, Franz A. J. (2008). The Seven Years War in Europe, 1756–1763. Pearson Education. ISBN 978-0-582-29272-7.
- Vierhaus, Rudolf (1984). Deutschland im Zeitalter des Absolutismus (1648–1763) (in German) (2 ed.). Vandenhoeck & Ruprecht. ISBN 3-525-33504-0.
- West, Fred (2001). Crucible of War: The Seven Years' War and the Fate of Empire in British North America, 1754–1766. Faber and Faber.
- Velichko, Konstantin I.; Novitsky, Vasily F.; Schwarz, Aleksey V. von; Apushkin, Vladimir A.; Schoultz, Gustav K. von (1913). Военная энциклопедия Сытина [Sytin Military Encyclopedia] (in Russian). Vol. XIII. Кобленц – Круз. Moscow: Типография Т-ва И. Д. Сытина. pp. 52–54.
- Tashlykov, S. L. (2016). "КОЛЬБЕРГА ОСАДЫ". Great Russian Encyclopedia. Electronic version.
