= Resko Przymorskie =

Coastal lake in the West Pomeranian Voivodeship, Poland

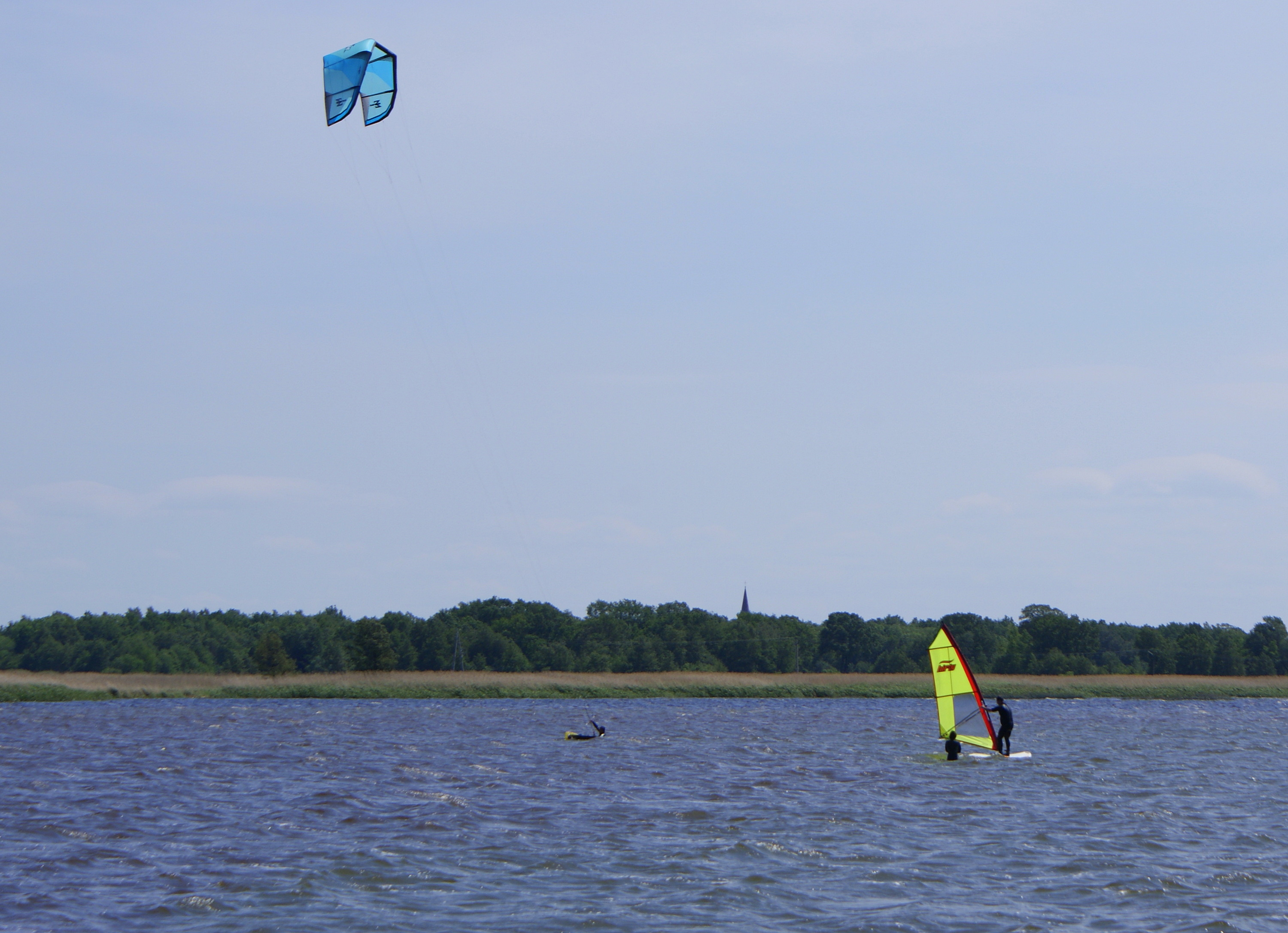
- Windsurfer and kiteboarder on Resko Przymorskie
- Interactive map of Resko Przymorskie
- Location: Trzebiatów Coast, Poland
- Coordinates: 54°08′32″N 15°22′37″E
- Type: Coastal
- Primary inflows: Old Rega, Błotnica, Łużanka
- Primary outflows: Błotnica (so-called Regoujście)
- Max. length: 3.8 kilometres (2.4 mi)
- Max. width: 2.35 kilometres (1.46 mi)
- Surface area: 55.39–66.86 square kilometres (21.39–25.81 sq mi)
- Average depth: 1.3 metres (4 ft 3 in)
- Max. depth: 2.5 metres (8 ft 2 in)
- Surface elevation: 0.1–0.3 metres (3.9 in – 11.8 in) above sea level
- Settlements: Dźwirzyno, Rogowo

Resko Przymorskie (German: Kamper See) is a coastal lake of the Baltic Sea on the Trzebiatów Coast, located in the West Pomeranian Voivodeship, within the gminas of Trzebiatów and Kołobrzeg. The surface area of the water body varies, according to various sources, from 55.39 square kilometers to even 66.86 square kilometers.

As a coastal lake, the water body serves as a protected natural habitat within the Natura 2000 network (Special Area of Conservation) known as the Trzebiatów-Kołobrzeg Coastal Belt. The lake's waters have been assessed as non-pristine, and the lake itself as vulnerable to environmental degradation.

The area of Resko Przymorskie is a breeding ground for waterfowl and a refugium for anseriformes. Thirteen breeding species have been observed around the lake, including four endangered species.

In terms of fishery typology, it is a pike-perch lake.

Resko Przymorskie is a shallow, polymictic lake with its bottom located in a cryptodepression.

== Location ==
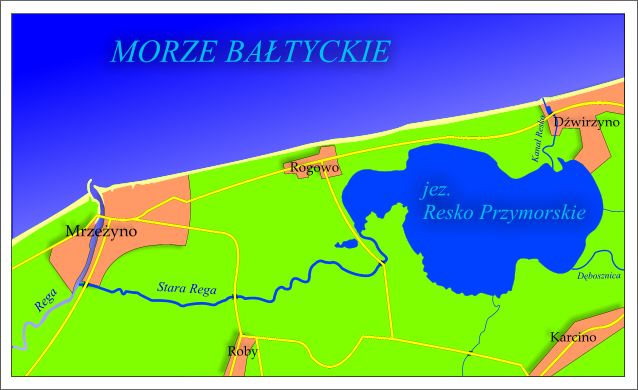
Location of the lake

The lake is located in the eastern part of the Trzebiatów Coast, in the northern part of the West Pomeranian Voivodeship, within the counties of Kołobrzeg and Gryfice. The western part of the lake belongs to the gmina of Trzebiatów, while the eastern part belongs to the gmina of Kołobrzeg.

The lake is separated from the Baltic Sea by a narrow strip of spit formed by a coastal dune ridge. The width of the spit varies from 0.3 to 1 km. The dunes on the lake's spit reach heights of up to 16 meters above sea level. Dźwirzyno lies along the northeastern shore of the lake, with a water station and a landing. Rogowo, with two holiday resorts, is situated along the northwestern shore of the lake.

The entire area of Resko Przymorskie, along with its surroundings, is located within the Trzebiatów-Kołobrzeg Coastal Belt, designated as a Special Area of Conservation under the Natura 2000 program. The lake is also situated within the Special Protection Area known as the "Trzebiatów Coast".

== Hydrological information ==
Resko Przymorskie is a natural water reservoir formed as a result of the separation of the bay by a spit from the sea. The surface area of the water mirror varies according to different sources, ranging from 55.39 km^{2} through 55.9 km^{2}, 57.71 km^{2}, 6.2 km^{2} up to 66.86 km^{2}. The differences in the reported sizes are significant and result from the variability of the lake's water level, which depends on weather conditions. Due to its free connection to the sea, the water resources in the lake and its surface area depend on the direction and strength of the winds, especially during storm surges. Within a day, the lake's water levels can rise by 0.5 meters, and during prolonged storms, the water level can be higher by up to 1.5 meters above normal, reaching over the embankments surrounding the lake. In 1949, the influx of seawater was so significant that it caused a flood. The water mirror is located at a height of 0.1 m above sea level or 0.3 m above sea level. The average depth of the lake is 1.3 m, while the maximum depth is 2.5 m. In the central-western part of the lake, there is a sandbank with a depth of 1 m.

The volume of water in the reservoir is 7703.4 thousand m³. The length of the shoreline at the average water level is estimated at 11.7 km, and this line stands out in comparison to other Polish coastal lakes. The lake bed is mostly sandy and was described as poorly silted in the early 1980s (at that time, the water transparency reached up to 1.5 m).

== Drainage basin ==
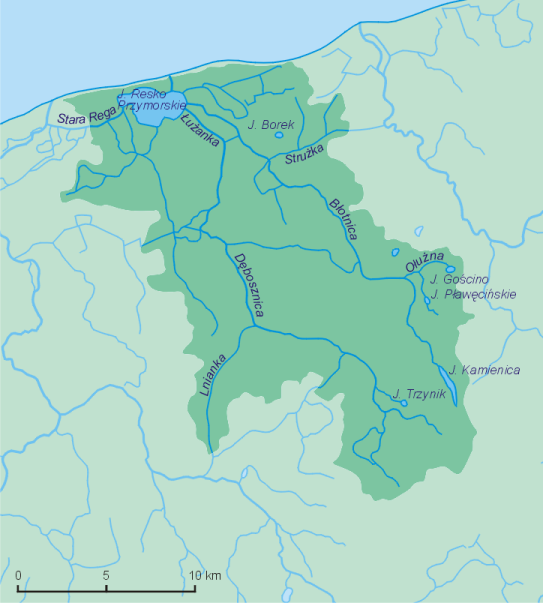
Drainage basin of Resko Przymorskie

The lake's drainage basin consists of the drainage basins of watercourses flowing into it. The Resko Przymorskie drainage basin belongs to the catchment area of the coastal rivers of the Baltic Sea.

One of the western bays of the lake is fed by the Old Rega, which is the old bed of the Rega river, flowing into the Baltic Sea west of Resko Przymorskie. Besides the Old Rega, various-sized ditches connect to the lake from the western and southern sides.

On the eastern shore, the Łużanka river, which is the lower course of the Dębosznica river, flows into the lake. Further north, waters from the so-called Nowa Błotnica (also Bagienny Rów), a canal (new channel) of the Błotnica river, flow into Resko Przymorskie. The former course of the river, in turn, flows into the lake further north on the eastern shore near Dźwirzyno.

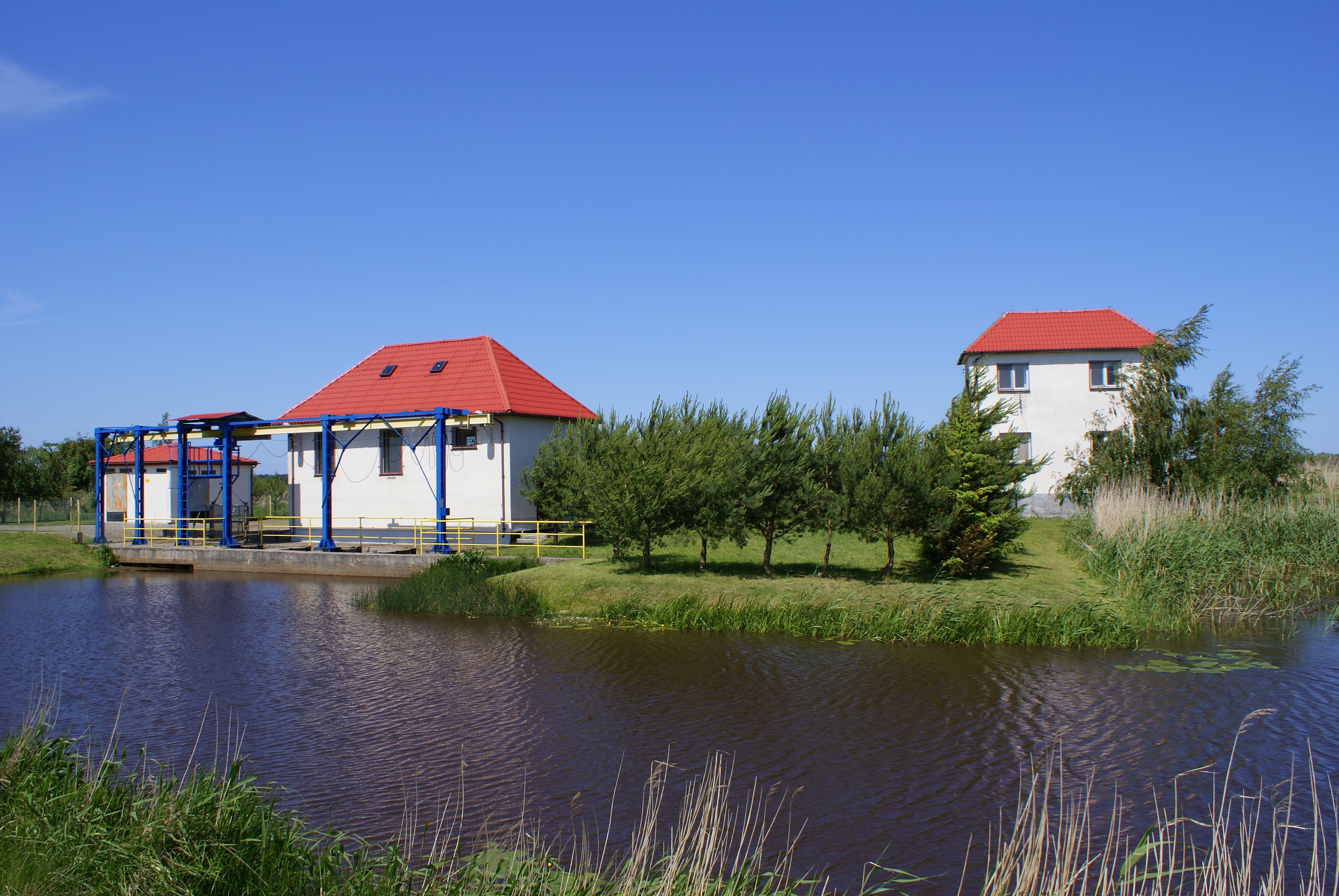
Pump station on the Old Rega river in front of the lake

Resko Przymorskie is connected to the sea in the northeastern part through a wide channel called Regoujście. The flow of water through the channel is unrestricted. The water level in the lake is variable, depending on the often prevailing sea winds causing surges when seawater enters the lake – hence the fluctuating data on the lake's surface area.

A small watercourse also flows into the lake from the southern shore, known as the inflow from Gosław.

== Nature ==
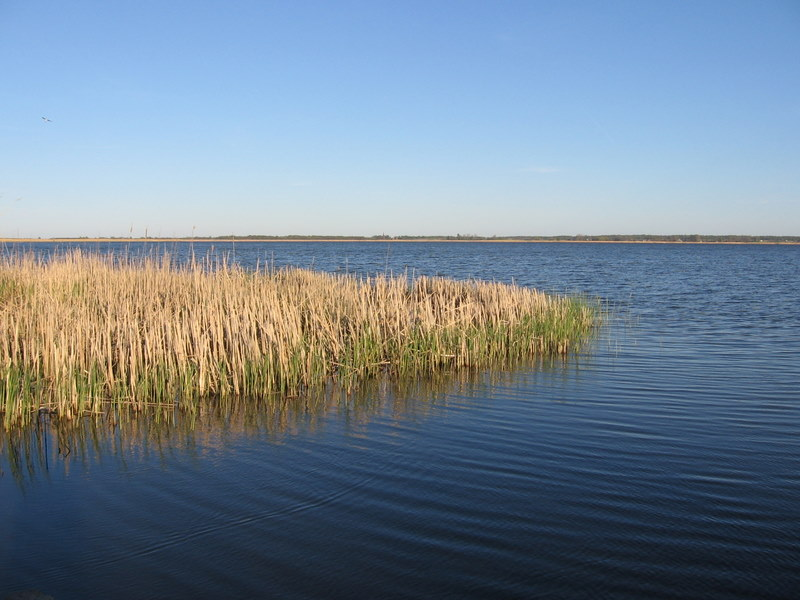
The lake from the northern side

On the eastern, southern, and western sides, extensive reed beds intersected by a network of ditches adjoin the lake. More stable ground covered with forest is located on the northern shore.

The coastal location of the lake and the free exchange of water between it and the sea are the reasons for the typical occurrence of species of animals that are typically freshwater and marine. Affinity with the Baltic fauna is especially evident near the watercourse connecting the lake to the sea.

According to data from the regional water management authority, the dominant fish species in the waters of Resko Przymorskie are: common bream, white bream, common roach, and northern pike. Other fish species found in the lake include: European eel, European perch, zander, tench, common rudd, ruffe, and common bleak.

The lake has inaccessible, heavily reed-covered shores, making it a refuge for many species of waterfowl. On the shores in the northern part of the lake near the outflow of the Regoujście, one of the three sites in Poland of the critically endangered plant species, the dwarf spikerush, was located.

Over Resko Przymorskie, 13 breeding bird species have been observed, including 4 classified as endangered in at least one scale (international, national, or regional) – the greylag goose, common goldeneye, bearded reedling, and red-backed shrike. Other bird species appear periodically during migrations or sometimes in winter, or they utilize the lake waters throughout the year as foraging grounds, for example, the white-tailed eagle. During migration seasons, they stop quite abundantly, in flocks ranging from tens to hundreds of individuals: grebes, Eurasian coots, common cranes, gulls, geese, and ducks. Among migrating birds, species listed in IUCN Red List, such as the northern pintail and osprey, have also been observed. Rare species in Poland such as common cranes, little gulls, and lesser black-backed gull are also encountered. The lake as a bird paradise was already described by the German ornithologist Artur B.G. Butz in 1933.

In 2007, the gmina of Kołobrzeg planned an ecological area in the eastern part of Resko Przymorskie (the western part belongs to the gmina of Trzebiatów). This area is a breeding ground for waterfowl and a refugium for migratory waterfowl, as well as a breeding ground for amphibians, reptiles, and mammals.

== Sanitary condition ==
As a result of research conducted in 1996 and 2003, the waters of Resko Przymorskie were classified as outside the classification system, and the lake itself was deemed not resistant to external influences. In terms of phosphates and mineral nitrogen content, the water met the requirements of Class I for sanitary condition. The studies showed the lake's richness in organic and mineral substances. The waters exhibited very high concentrations of nitrogen, phosphorus, chlorophyll, and seston dry mass. Water transparency was described as very low. The main inflow to the lake is the Błotnica River, whose waters are classified as Class III quality. Downstream from the water quality measurement point, Błotnica also receives water from the Dębosznica river, which has Class IV water quality.

The lake is heavily eutrophicated, and its water quality does not meet the standards of Class III purity for lake waters. It is a shallow body of water with limited water exchange. Water outflow occurs directly into the sea and is possible when the Baltic Sea level is low in the coastal area. Water quality is determined by strong phytoplankton blooms, as well as high concentrations of biogenic elements and excessive amounts of organic compounds.

In Rogowo, sewage was discharged into a military sewage treatment plant, which was technically malfunctioning. Currently, sewage is directed to a sewage treatment plant near Trzebiatów. In 1993, Dźwirzyno was connected to the sewage system, and sewage from the town is directed to a sewage treatment plant in Grzybowo. Previously, one holiday resort had a "Bioblok" sewage treatment plant. Sewage from the remaining facilities was removed.

== Development ==
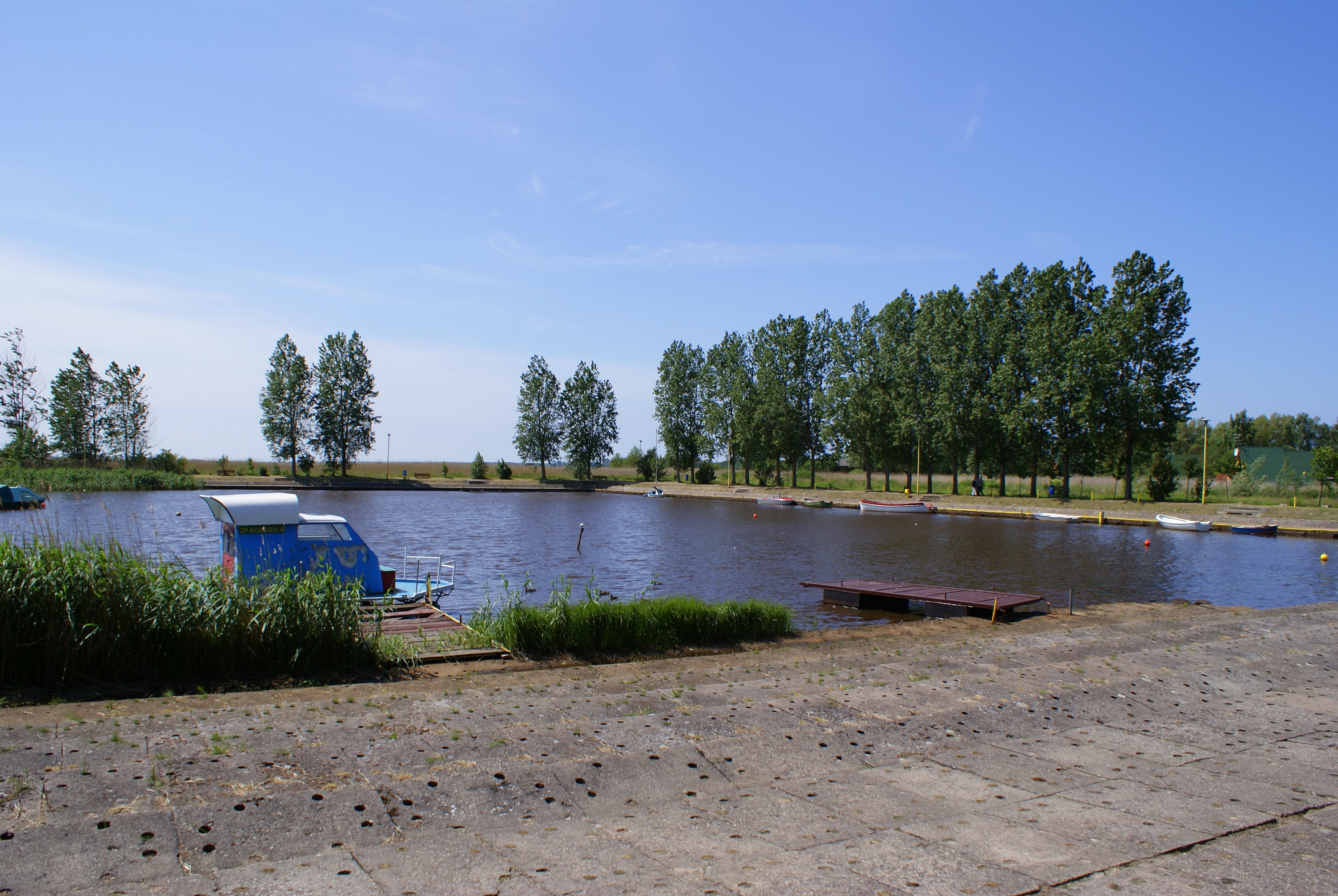
Marina on the lake in Dźwirzyno

The regional water management authority in Szczecin is the administrator of the waters of Resko Przymorskie. It has established a fishing area that includes the waters of Resko Przymorskie along with the waters of watercourses flowing into the lake that do not constitute separate districts, i.e., without the Błotnica and Łużanka rivers. The water body is managed by the "Mielno" Fisheries Company, which conducts fisheries management in the lake and charges fees for fishing. Net fishing is hindered by wrecks lying on the lake bottom, remnants from the war.

Near the mouth of the Old Rega into the lake, there is a private special fishing ground on ponds covering an area of approximately 2.5 hectares, where local tourists engage in fishing.

According to data from the Provincial Inspectorate of Environmental Protection in Szczecin from 2004, common reed is harvested in many places around the lake.

=== Tourism resources ===
Resko Przymorskie is a tourist destination during the summer season.

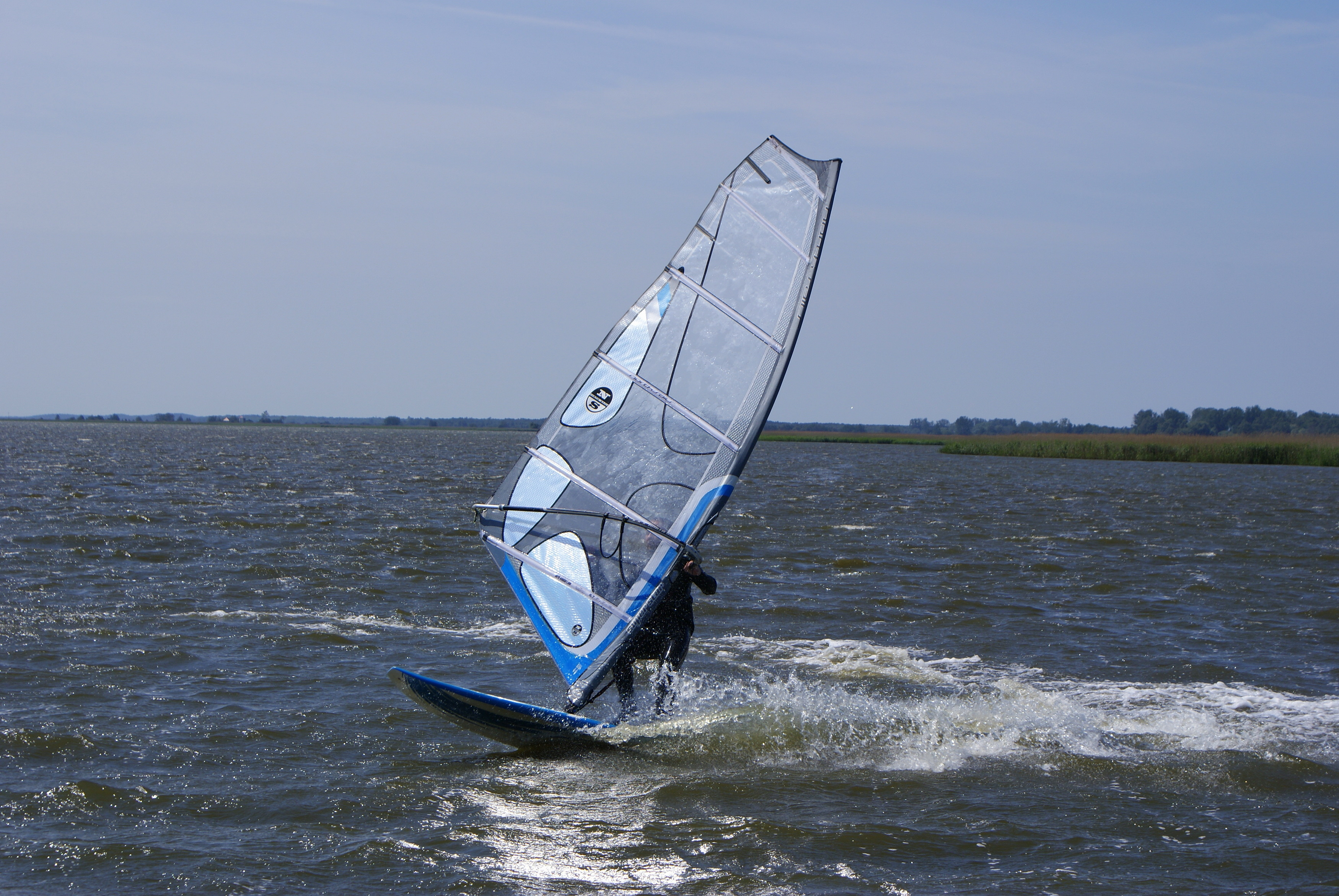
Windsurfer on the lake

In Dźwirzyno, at the mouth of the Błotnica river into the lake, a wooden marina with a landing has been built, where pedal boats and yachts are available. This area is used as a base for windsurfing and kiteboarding enthusiasts. The vicinity of the marina is a popular walking spot for holidaymakers.

Across the spit of Resko Przymorskie, an international cycling route, the Baltic Sea Cycle Route (R-10), runs along a county road, which is part of the EuroVelo network (EV10). South of the lake, the Coastal Hiking Trail (red, Świnoujście–Żarnowiec) runs through Mrzeżyno, Roby, Karcino, and Dźwirzyno.

The Cycling Tourism Association from Kołobrzeg has designated the "Cycling Trail around Lake Resko Przymorskie", which is 52 km long. Additionally, a natural and historical cycling route called "Towards the Sun" has been established in the eastern part of the lake.

== History ==
The earliest written records regarding the lake pertain to natural contributions in the form of fish that the inhabitants of the fishing village, established in 1180 by the Premonstratensians and situated by Lake Resko Przymorskie, were supposed to deliver to the monastery.

Previously, the Rega river flowed into Resko Przymorskie, and the remnants of its former bed form the Old Rega. There was a port called Regoujście by the lake, and commercial navigation took place on the river. The port was under the administration of Trzebiatów and posed competition to Kołobrzeg. According to some sources, in 1456, the inhabitants of Kołobrzeg attacked Regoujście militarily, sinking ships with a cargo of stones in the port, thus cutting off Trzebiatów from access to the sea. According to others, it was a storm that sank the ships, destroying the port. The following year, the people of Trzebiatów dug a canal, through which the Rega has since flowed into the Baltic Sea at the port in Mrzeżyno. The new port in Mrzeżyno operated until 1497, when storms sank the ships anchored there, rendering the harbor unusable until 1538.

During the pre-war period, an observation post (German: Naturwarte) was established by Artur B.G. Butz by Lake Resko. However, the initiative ended in scandal due to "stolen literature", and after intervention by the gendarmes and the Prussian Central Office for the Preservation of Natural Monuments (German: Preußische Zentralstelle für Naturdenkmalpflege), the facility was discredited.

Until 1935, about 0.5 km upstream from the mouth of the Old Rega into the lake, there was a fishing village called Kamp, where cottages covered with thatch stood. In 1936, the construction of a barracks settlement and a maritime airport for the Rogowo garrison began. The Kamper See was utilized by the reconnaissance aviation regiment stationed here, whose seaplanes took off and landed on the lake. A large concrete square remains on the northern shore, from which concrete strips extend toward the sea and the lake.

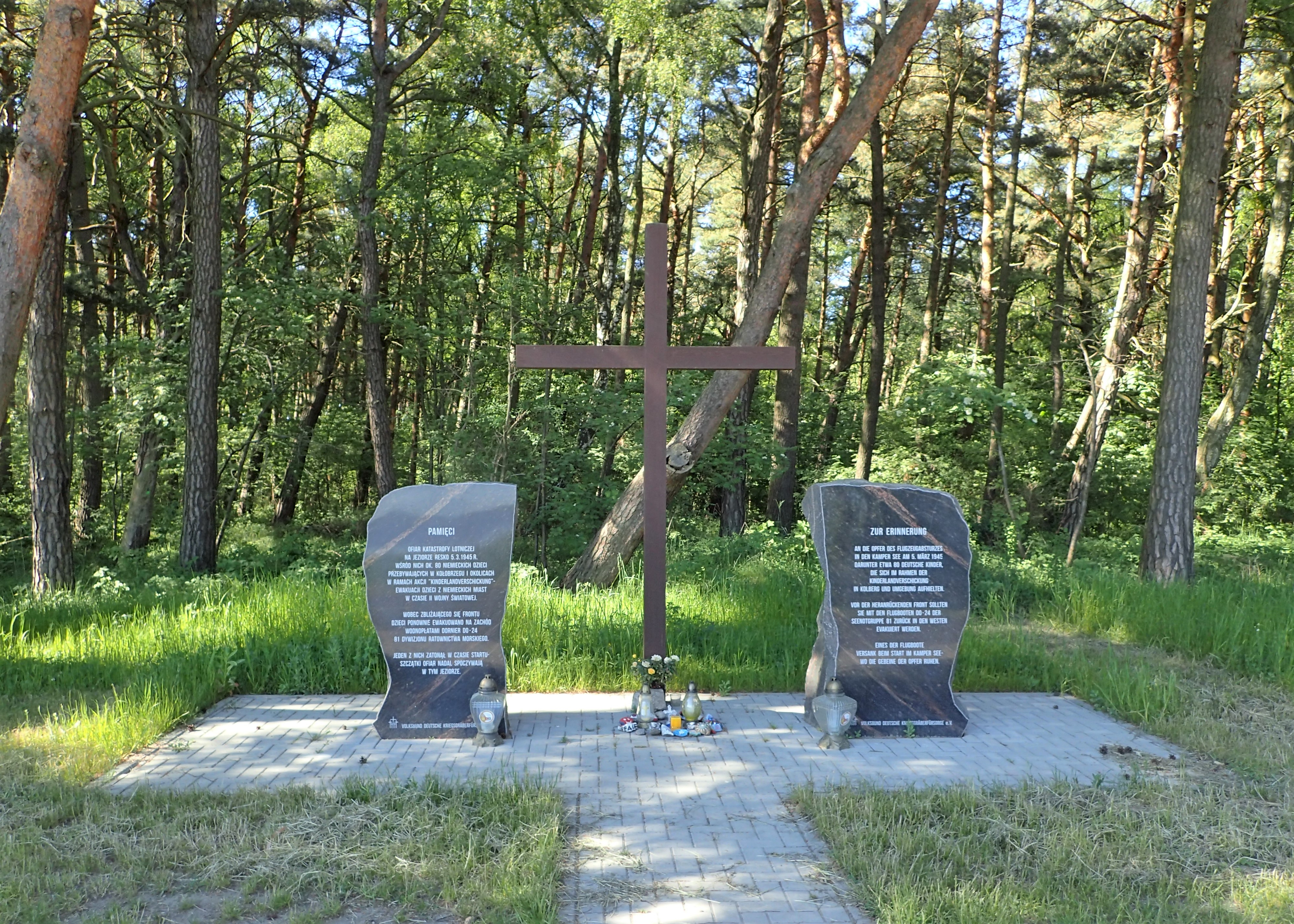
Cross on the shore of the lake commemorating the 80 German children who died in it on 5 March 1945 during an evacuation attempt

In 1945, the lake was used as a landing site for German Air Force's seaplanes. In early spring (most likely in the last days of March), when the Red Army troops reached the shores of the lake from the east, a German transport aircraft, the Junkers Ju 52, appeared with the intention of landing. When the pilot realized he was right on the front line, he attempted to take off, but the aircraft was hit by Soviet artillery fire. The Junkers crashed into the lake a few dozen meters from the shore held by the Germans, who, despite the shelling, attempted to retrieve the aircraft from Resko. Steel cables were attached to tanks in an attempt to wrap around the cockpit protruding above the surface of the lake. This action failed, and the aircraft sank. German prisoners later testified that the transport aircraft had departed from Königsberg (Kaliningrad) and was carrying an extremely valuable cargo. In August 1946, there was an unsuccessful attempt by Soviet soldiers to salvage the aircraft, during which it broke in half. The body of a soldier in a general's uniform with German distinctions emerged from the cockpit.

Years later, the former commander of the Red Army unit, Colonel I.G. Nowikow, wrote a letter to the head of the Kaliningard group responsible for searching for looted works of art. He described the events related to the sinking of the aircraft in Resko Przymorskie along with a map and suggested that the sunken Junkers may contain crates with the Amber Room. After Nowikow's death, in 1987, the lake bed was examined in an attempt to find it. A Polish-Soviet expedition comprised divers from the Voronezh club "Rif," Polish soldiers, and scouts. The group leader, Boris Waszkiewicz from the Polish Scouting Association, explained that despite using trawls, ejectors, magnetometers, and military equipment, they encountered many difficulties, particularly with visibility and a three-meter layer of silt. After many days of searching, they brought to the surface several small fragments of the front part of the aircraft, as well as part of a silver tableware set, a pendant, and a wedding ring. Documents and food ration cards from the pilot's cabin were also found, confirming that the aircraft had flown from Kaliningrad. However, the divers were unable to reach the second part of the broken aircraft – the cargo hatch.

The Polish Press Agency reported that on 18 August 1989, another search for the remains of a German aircraft in Resko Przymorskie began. In contrast to the previous version about the seaplane model, it was stated that the sunken aircraft was a Dornier Do 24.

At the beginning of May 2009, during a three-day diving expedition in Lake Resko Przymorskie, divers found elements of a German aircraft from World War II. Mirosław Huryn, the CEO of the Museum-Fort "Rogowo" Foundation, stated that many indications suggest that the found parts are fragments of a German seaplane, the Dornier Do 24. This aircraft most likely carried 72 German children and caregivers, who were attempting to evacuate on 5 March 1945, from a nearby airfield to Stralsund, Germany. The plane was hit in the engine by Soviet artillery fire and crashed into the lake, in front of thousands of other children and caregivers gathered at the airfield. No one survived this tragedy. A monument erected in the early 21st century commemorates the victims of the crash.

Until 2001, a significant part of Lake Resko Przymorskie and the area of the spit from the bridge over the canal in Dźwirzyno were inaccessible to the civilian population due to military use of the area.

=== Hydronimics ===
Linguist Mikołaj Rudnicki proposed the name Resko to designate the Camp lake (Polish: kęp(a)) when studying the etymology of the name of the Rega river in 1935. He indicated that derivatives of the river's name include Resko (jezioro) ≤ *Režъsko jezero, similar to Łeba and Łebsko.

The name of the lake was recorded in 1680 as Campische See and in 1789 as Campsche See.

The name "Resko Przymorskie" was officially introduced in 1948 when the previous German name of the lake, Kamper See, was changed. The previous name originated from the name of the fishing village Kamp. The current name is related to the Rega river and its coastal location.
