= Cocceius =

Cocceius may refer to:

- Cocceius (skipper), a genus of butterfly
- Cocceius Auctus (fl. 1st century BC – 1st century AD), Roman architect
- Johannes Cocceius (1603–1699), Dutch theologian

== See also ==
- Cocceia gens
- Cocceji
