= Heinrich Sigismund von der Heyde =

German officer

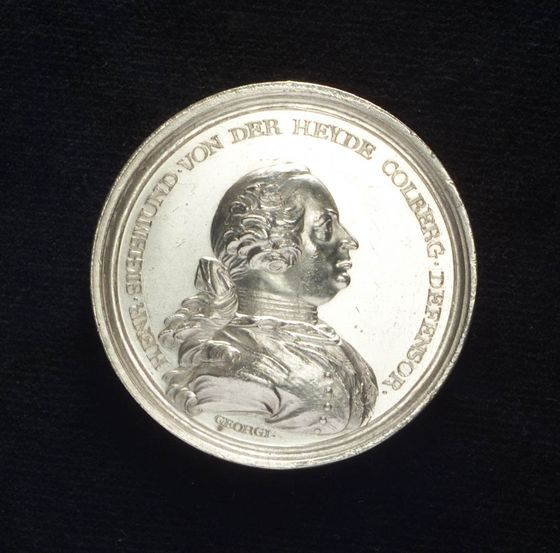
- Commemorative coin struck to mark the Prussian success at Kolberg.
- Born: 1 January 1703; Schacksdorf, Lower Lusatia
- Died: 4 May 1765 (aged 62); Kolberg
- Burial place: Marienkirche of Kolberg
- Military career
- Allegiance: (Kingdom of Prussia) Prussia
- Branch: Army
- Service years: 1718–1765
- Rank: Lieutenant General
- Conflicts: Second Silesian War; Seven Years' War
- Awards: Pour le Mérite; Equestrian statue of Frederick the Great

Heinrich Sigismund von der Heyde was a Prussian officer and commander-in-chief of Kolberg (born 1703 in the Lower Lusatia region of Brandenburg – 4 May 1765 in Kolberg). He is best known for his tenacious defense of Kolberg during its three sieges of the Seven Years' War. He received the Pour le Merite and he is immortalized on the Equestrian statue of Frederick the Great.

== Family ==
Heyde was born 1 January 1703 in Schacksdorf, a village in the Lower Lusatia region of Brandenburg. He was the son of Heinrich Siegmund von der Heyde, heir to Schacksdorf, and Magdalene Sophie von Stutterheim from Sellendorf.

== Military career ==
Heyde entered the Prussian military in Infantry Regiment Nr. 3 (Alt-Anhalt) in 1718. Between 1726 and 1740, he received a series of promotions. In 1740, he was a staff officer for Leopold of Anhalt-Dessau. In 1741, he also received his first command, a grenadier company, as a captain, with which he also fought in the First Silesian War. In 1744 and 1745 he fought in Bohemia and Moravia. He was injured in the Battle of Hohenfriedberg. Based on differences between him and Leopold, in 1747, the King ordered his transfer to Regiment Nr. 2 (Röder) garrisoned in Königsberg.

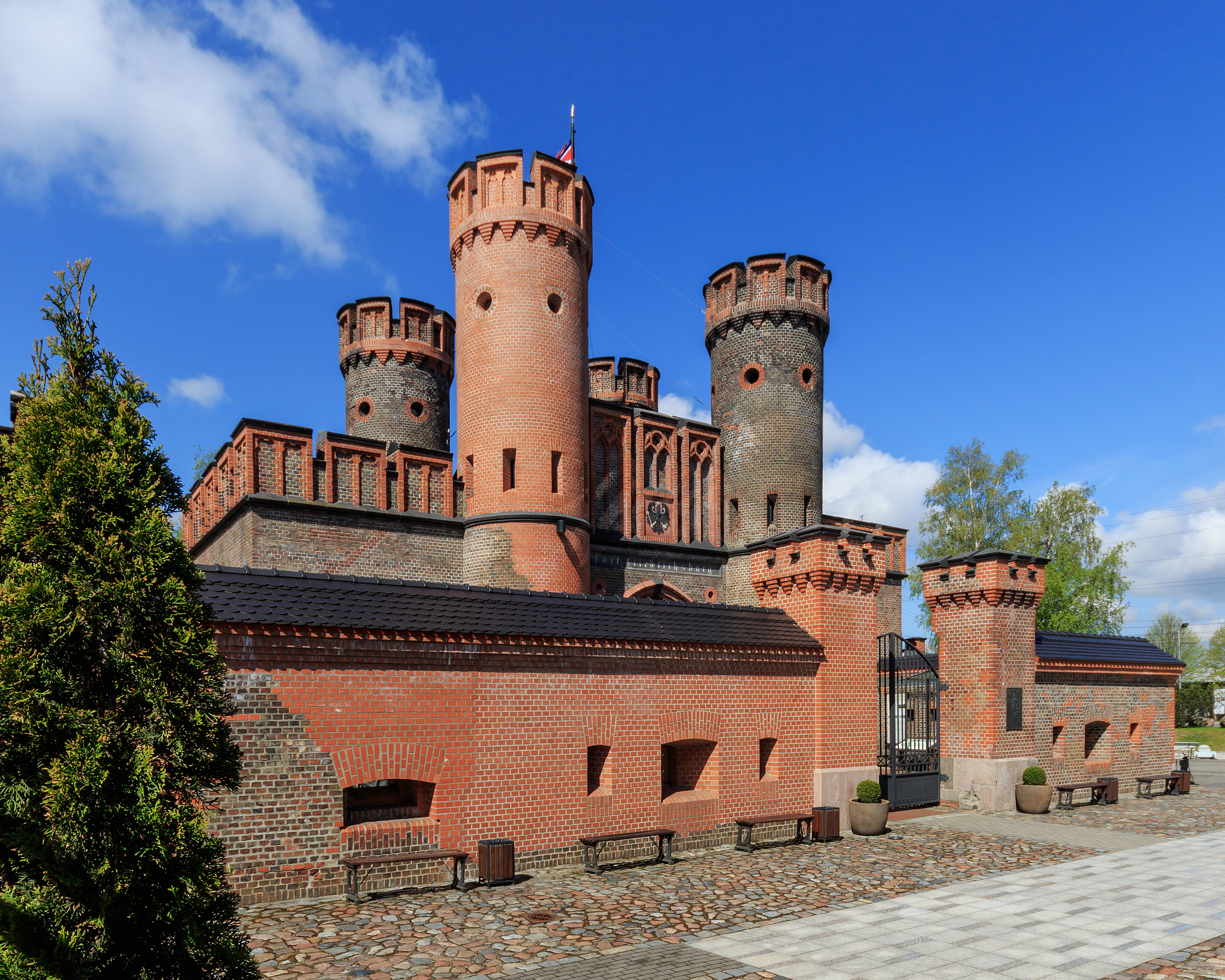
By 1755, Heyde was commander of Fortress Friedrichsburg

On 5 June 1753, he became a major and commander of Grenadier Battalion Nr. 4, still in Königsberg. On 13 December 1755, just prior to the outbreak of the Seven Years' War, he became commander of the Fort Friedrichsburg near Königsberg. In 1757, he fought against the invading Russian troops but, after the Battle of Gross-Jägersdorf and a new Russian advance in 1758, he withdrew to the fortress of Kolberg with his troops.

=== Sieges of Kolberg ===
On 3 October 1758, now as deputy commander of the Kolberg fortress, Heyde organized the city's defense when the Russian general Johann von Palmbach besieged the fortress. After several thwarted attacks, Palmbach appeared to retreat in the night from 29 October; the next day, Heyde repulsed a surprise attack with two battalions, and a troop of armed citizens. For this stubborn defense, he was promoted to colonel, and Frederick the Great awarded him the Pour le Mérite.

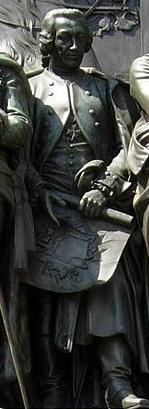
Heyde's stout defense of Kolberg earned him a place on the Equestrian statue of Frederick the Great in 1851, on which he is depicted holding a map of Kolberg

On 26 August 1760, during the second siege of Kolberg, a united force of Swedish and Russian troops surrounded the fortress on water and land. On 27 August, Kolberg was bombarded from the sea by the entire Russian Baltic fleet: twenty-one ships of the line, three frigates and three bomb vessels. On 29 August, they were joined by six ships of line and three frigates of their Swedish allies. Heyde deployed his 700 troops to construct siege works on 6 September; cavalry units covered the construction. He defended Kolberg with his limited number of troops until 18 September, when General Paul von Werner arrived with 3,800 men after a 13-day, 340 kilometres (210 mi) forced march from Silesia. Werner deployed his troops and attacked immediately with such force that the Russians believed they were facing an army of about 20,000; the Russians retreated. Two coins commemorate this act: one with the image of Werner, one with the image of Heyde. The King sent a gold and twenty silver coins with a personal thank you to Heyde. After the second siege of Kolberg, Frederick reevaluated his previously lukewarm opinion of Heyde: I am not infallible; in this man I have been greatly wrong. Financially, Heyde's heroism did not pay off; he received as a commander a salary of 600 taler against of which, shortly before his death, 800 were still owed. Heyde and Werner were promoted to the rank of lieutenant general.

=== Final siege and captivity ===
Kolberg's strategic value remained high for the Russians, and a third siege under the Russian commander Pyotr Alexandrovich Rumyantsev-Zadunaisky began on 3 September 1761. Friedrich Eugen, Duke of Württemberg marched from the Swedish front in Mecklenburg and secured the surrounding countryside, but he, like the troops stranded inside the fortress, struggled with supply problems. On 18 September, Rumyantsev stormed Württemberg's defenses outside the town, suffering 3,000 casualties and gaining little. Rumyantsev altered his strategy: instead of wasting troops in storming entrenched defenses, he would cut off Kolberg's supplies.

Prussian relief troops—several thousand of them commanded by General Dubislav von Platen—managed to break through to Kolberg later in the month, but a comprehensive break out through Russian lines on 17 October failed. Kolberg, although secured by some 20,000 troops, was consuming supplies at a fast rate. The Russian navy had also reappeared and resumed bombardment of the fortress. Platen extricated himself and his troops to safety, but the garrison itself remained trapped inside the city, with depleting supplies, and the Duke's troops remained in their defensive positions. In November, Württemberg abandoned Kolberg, broke through the Russian lines to reunite with Platen; their joint forces assaulted Rumyantsev unsuccessfully from the rear. After this last effort, Platen departed as ordered by Friedrich; Württemberg tried several more times to force his way back into the fortress. On 12 December, the Russian forces halted his attempt at Spie, southwest of Kolberg, inflicting 1,000 casualties on the Duke's force. Württemberg's remaining 8,000 troops retreated to Stettin, leaving Kolberg to its fate.

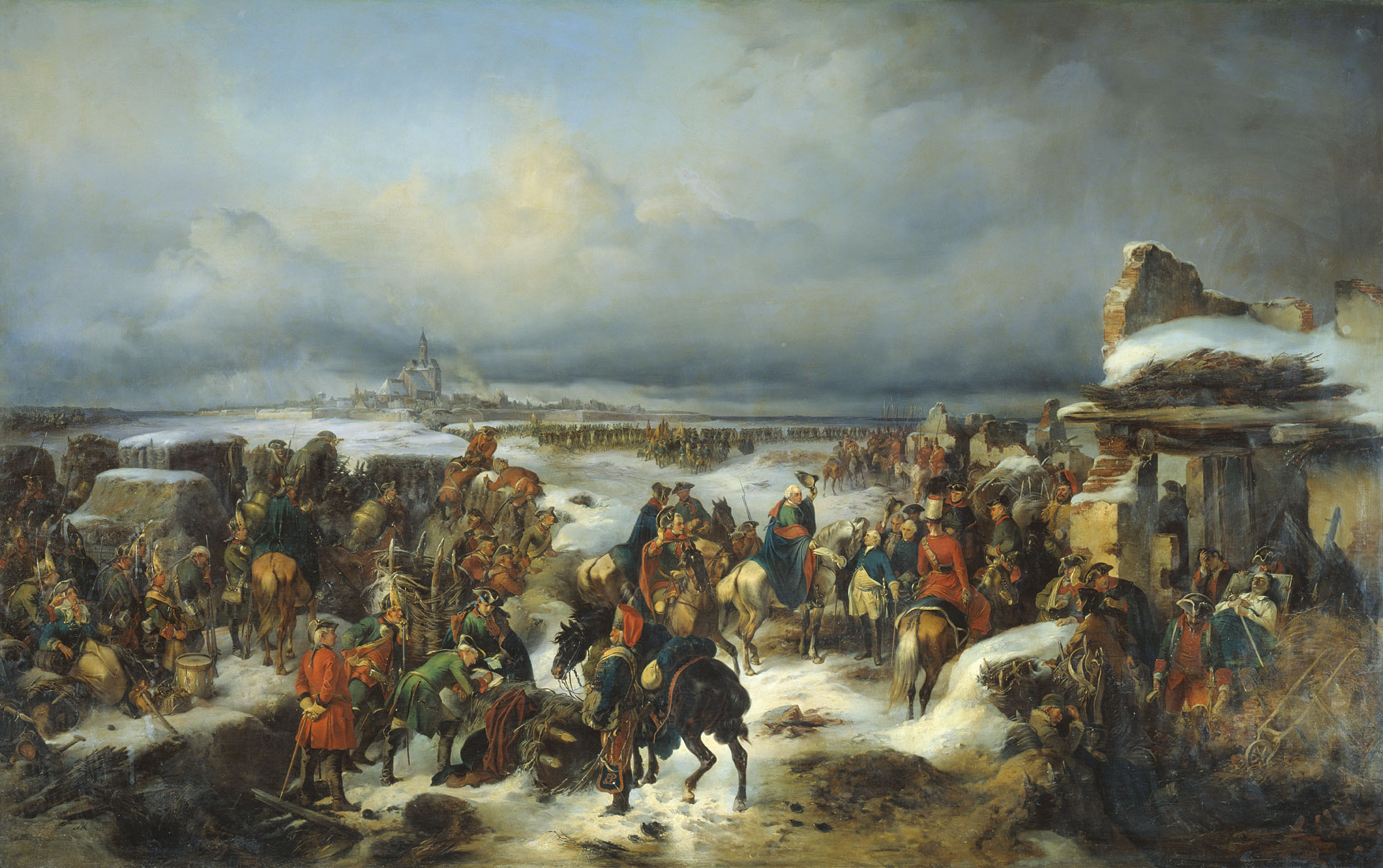
The besieged fortress of Kolberg fell to the Russians in December 1761 and Heyde and his troops marched into Russian captivity.

Five days later, on 17 December 1761, the starving city capitulated. The city residents, and Heyde, his troops and their families, received medical treatment and food. Heyde and his troops marched to captivity in Russia.

After the death of Czarina Elizabeth of Russia on 5 January 1762, the Prussophile Peter III came to power and ended the Russia's participation in the war. The prisoners-of-war turned around and marched back to Prussia.

== Final years ==
After his brief imprisonment, Heyde was reinstated in Prussian service in Königsberg, in the fortress of Friedricksburg, but in April 1763, Heyde returned to Kolberg where he remained as commander until his death in 1765. He was buried in the Marienkirche (Saint Mary's Church) of Kolberg. In May 1851, his name was inscribed on the Equestrian statue of Frederick the Great.

== Rank ==
Promotions

- Fahnrich: 16 August 1718 (Regiment Nr. 3)
- Ensign: 1726
- Second Lieutenant: 1731
- First (Premier) Lieutenant: 1736
- Regimental chief of staff: 1740
- Captain: 1741
- Major: 1753
- Colonel: 1758
- Lt. General: 1760
