= Hans Friedrich von Platen =

German military personnel

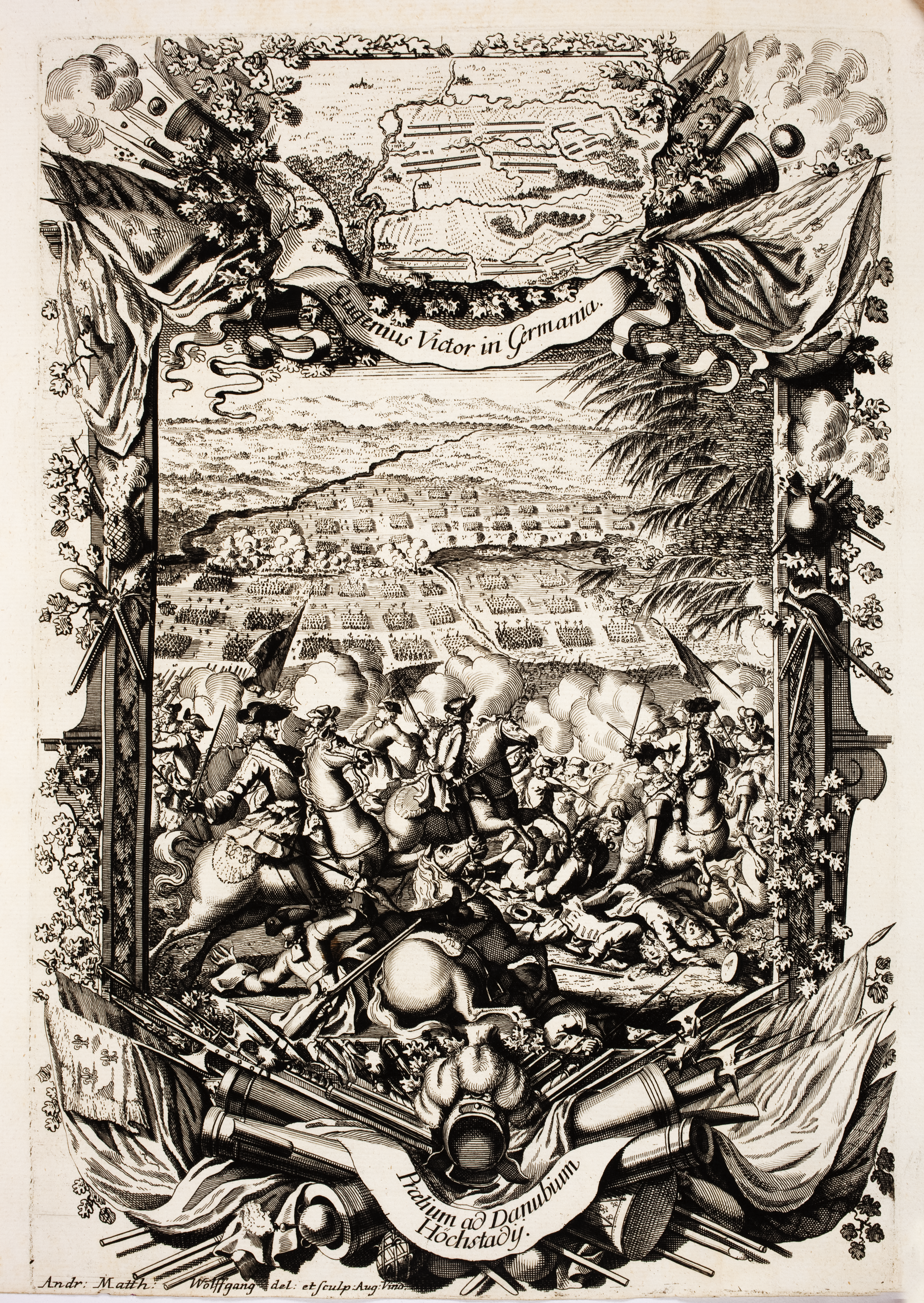
- Platen was captured by the French at the First Battle of Höchstädt
- Born: 21 January 1668
- Died: 17 May 1743 (aged 75)
- Relatives: Dubislav Friedrich von Platen(son); Leopold Johann von Platen (son)
- Military career
- Allegiance: Prussia
- Branch: Prussian Army
- Service years: 1701–1766
- Rank: General of Cavalry
- Conflicts: Great Turkish War; War of Spanish Succession; Great Northern War

Hans Friedrich von Platen (21 January 1668 at his family's estate at Sagar on Ruegen, 17 May 1743 in Mohrungen, Prussia) was a Kingdom of Prussian general of the cavalry. While in service in the Prussian Army, he fought in the Great Turkish War, the War of Spanish Succession, and the Great Northern War. Both of his sons were Prussian generals; the youngest, Dubislav Friedrich von Platen, was a trusted and successful general of Frederick the Great.

== Family ==
Hans Friedrich von Platen was a member of the Pomeranian noble family of Platen. His parents were Hans Friedrich von Platen and Maria Elisabeth von Münchow. His father was killed by a neighbor shortly before his birth.

He married Hypolita Juliane von Podewils. She was the daughter of the Brandenburg colonel Mathis Georg von Podewils. The pair had the following children:

- Dubislav Friedrich (23 August 1714–7 June 1787) ∞ Sophia Susanna Charlotte von Cocceji, daughter of the Prussian Minister Samuel von Cocceji.
- Leopold Johann (1726–11 December 1780) ∞ Dorothea von Eichstädt (1733–1795)
- Sophie Anna († 9 June 1755) ∞ 1743 Hans Sigismund von Zieten
- Johanna Friederike († 1745) ∞ 9 June 1740 Otto Friedrich Ludwig von Hirsch (1700–1780)

== Military career ==
Hans Friedrich von Platen began his military career as a simple dragoon in the Brandenburg Life Dragoon regiment. With this unit, he fought in Hungary in 1686 during the Great Turkish War. In 1688 he joined the Dragoon Regiment No.3 (Derflinger), of which he was quartermaster. His conduct drew the attention of Colonel von Heiden and he was soon appointed an adjutant and cornet in 1691. He was released during the peacetime reduction in 1697.

=== Action in the War of Spanish Succession ===
Count Philip Wilhelm soon took him as a cornet to his regiment, and he fought as a second lieutenant in the War of Spanish Succession. He had been promoted to first lieutenant by the time of the sieges of Kaiserswerth and Venlo. From 1702 he became general adjutant of Dubislav Gneomar von Natzmer. With Natzmer's help, Platen became a deputy in the Gensdarmes' regiment. In 1703 he was involved in the siege of Bonn. He was captured at the Battle of Höchstädt (1704), when the French army under Claude Louis Hector de Villars defeated the imperial armies; he was soon exchanged.

In 1705 Platen fought on the Upper Rhine and in 1706 on the Lower Rhine. In 1707 he was promoted to major and fought the following year in the Battle of Oudenaarde. He participated in the conquests of Lille and Ghent as well as in Mons. In 1709 he fought in the decisive Battle of Malplaquet. There, he impressed Frederick William, then the Prussian crown prince, who introduced him to the king and rewarded him with estates at Putzermin and half of Fritzow. Platen fought in 1710 at Douay, Bethune, and Aire and, in 1711, at Bouchain. He remained in Holland until the Peace of Utrecht.

=== Service in Pomerania ===
In the Pomeranian campaign of the Great Northern War, Platen was at the Siege of Stralsund. At the beginning of the reign of Frederick William, he became lieutenant colonel; on 28 June 1717, he was appointed colonel and in 1725 took over the Dragoon Regiment No. 1 as Inhaber (Proprietor). In 1728, he was appointed generalmajor and, on 12 July 1739, generalleutnant. After the Battle of Mollwitz in 1741, his regiment was divided; he retained command of half, and the other half fell under the command of Colonel Karl Friedrich von Posadowsky.

On 12 May 1743, Frederick II appointed him general of the cavalry, but whether he ever learned of it is unclear, since he died on 17 May 1743 in Mohrungen.
