= Meller-Zakomelsky (family) =

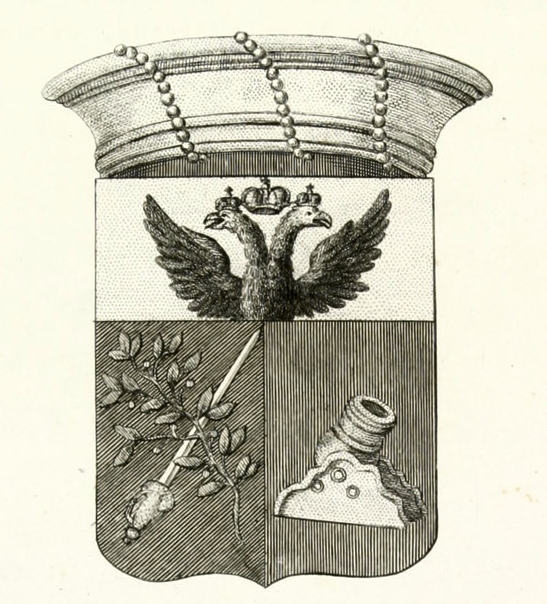
Coat of Arms of the Meller-Zakomelsky family. (1798)

The Meller–Zakomelsky family (German: Möller-Sakomelski) is a Russian noble family of German origin. Members of the family held the title of Baron in the Russian Empire.

== History ==
The founder of the House was Johann Möller-Sakomelsky (Russian: Ivan), who was awarded the name in 1789 when he was made a baron.

== Known members ==
- Ivan Möller-Sakomelsky (1725—1790), baron
  - Pyotr Ivanovich Meller-Zakomelsky (1755—1823) (ru)
    - Anna Petrovna Maykova (1798—1875) — Daughter-in-law of poet A. A. Maykova, brother of Nikolay
    - Yegor Petrovich Meller-Zakomelsky (1798—?) — Landowner in Kharkov
    - Pyotr Petrovich Meller-Zakomelsky (1806—1869) — Knight of St. George (1847)
    - Vladimir Petrovich Meller-Zakomelsky (1807—1862) — Major-General
      - Fyodor Vladimirovich Meller-Zakomelsky (1857—1905) — Captain
        - Vladimir Fyodorovich Meller-Zakomelsky (1894—1962) — Married to Nataly Georgievna (1900—1995), daughter of Duke G. N. Leuchtenberg (ru)
      - Vladimir Vladimirovich Meller-Zakomelsky (ru) (1863—1920) — Politician and businessman
        - Alexander Vladimirovich Meller-Zakomelsky (1898—1977), Nazi writer and Russian émigré
  - Ivan Ivanovich Meller-Zakomelsky
    - Nikolay Ivanovich Meller-Zakomelsky (ru) (1813—1887) — General-Adjutant, General of the Infantry
      - Alexander Nikolayevich Meller-Zakomelsky (1844—1928)
      - Sergey Nikolayevich Meller-Zakomelsky (1848—1899) — Knight of St. George (1876)
  - Yegor Ivanovich Meller-Zakomelsky (ru) (1767—1830) - Russian Cavalry officer, Commander of the Mariapol Hussars in 1809 during the Russian 'invasion' of Austrian Galicia.
  - Fjodor Ivanovich Meller-Zakomelsky (ru) (1772—1848) — Governor of Mogilev, Cavalry leader
  - Maria Ivanovna

== See also ==
- Meller-Zakomelsky
