= Cocceji =

Cocceji is a surname, sometimes used with the nobiliary particle "von", meaning "of", and may refer to:

- Heinrich von Cocceji (1644–1719), German jurist
- Samuel von Cocceji (1679–1755), German jurist
