= Dębosznica =

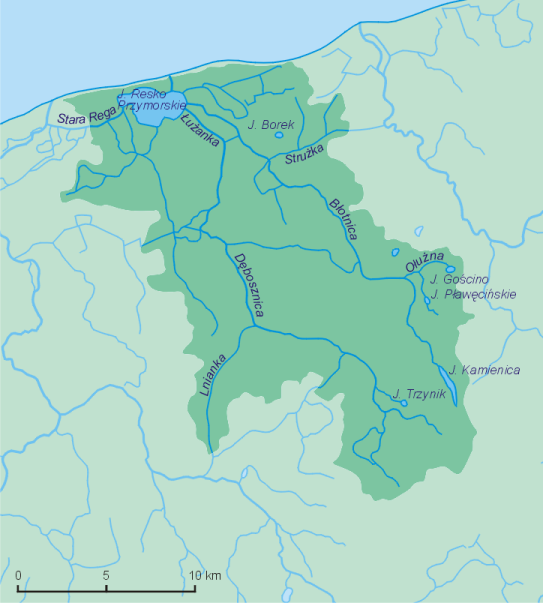

Location
- Country: Poland
- Voivodeship: West Pomeranian
- County (Powiat): Kołobrzeg

Physical characteristics
- Source
  - location: west of Leszczyn, Gmina Rymań
  - coordinates: 53°57′40.0″N 15°33′52.0″E
- Mouth: Błotnica and Łużanka
  - location: Głowaczewo, Gmina Kołobrzeg
  - coordinates: 54.1296°N 15.4469°E
- Length: 32 km (20 mi)

Basin features
- Progression: Błotnica→ Baltic Sea

Dębosznica is a river of Poland. At Głowaczewo, Kołobrzeg County, the Dębosznica is split by a weir into two strands: the left (southern) becomes a stream called the Łużanka, and the other merges into the Błotnica.
