= Alexander Meller-Zakomelsky =

Russian military personnel (1844-1928)

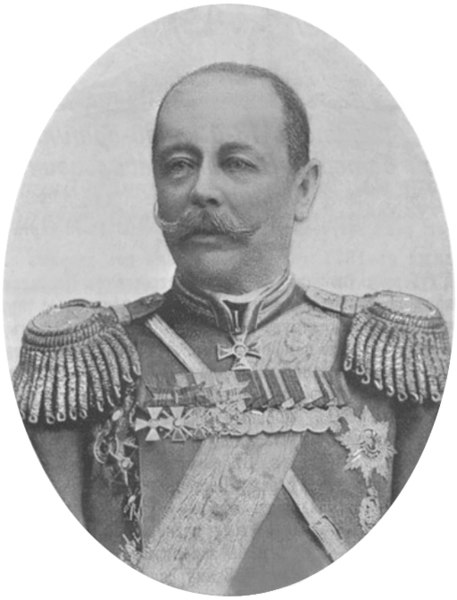
Alexander Meller-Zakomelsky in 1904

Alexander Nikolayevich Meller-Zakomelsky (Russian: Александр Николаевич Меллер-Закомельский; German: Alexander Nikolajewitsch Möller-Sakomelski; 13 November [O.S. 1 November] 1844, in St. Petersburg — 15 April 1928, in Nice) was a Russian General of the infantry (06.12.1906) and Governor-General in the Imperial Russian Army and of the Russian Empire.

== Family ==
Alexander was a member of the Meller-Zakomelsky family, being the great grandson of Ivan Ivanovich Möller-Sakomelsky. His father was Nikolay Ivanovich Meller-Zakomelsky (ru) (1813—1887) — General-Adjutant, General of the Infantry.

== Career ==
During the 1905 Russian Revolution Meller-Zakomelsky took an active part in suppressing the revolt: 13 January 1905 (Julian Calendar), 50,000 workers protested against the Governor-General Meller-Zakomelsky in Riga, Livonia Governorate, and marched through the city. To put down the protests, Meller-Zakomelsky gave orders to the soldiers to fire on the crowd: 70 people were killed, and 200 injured. In the wake of the massacre, Meller-Zakomelsky took pride in the way his troops handled the situation, writing to the Tsar suggesting that there would be no more further trouble if more local authorities were willing to act as he had.

== Personal life ==
He was an active member of the irregular freemasonic lodge, the Grand Orient of Russia’s Peoples.

== Bibliography ==
- Figes, Orlando (2014). A People's Tragedy: The Russian Revolution 1891–1924. London: The Bodley Head. ISBN 9781847922915.
