= Meller-Zakomelsky =

Meller-Zakomelsky or Möller-Sakomelski/Sakomelsky is a Russian surname of German and noble origins. It may refer to:

- Alexander Meller-Zakomelsky (1844–1928) — Imperial Russian Governor of Livonia and General
- Ivan Möller-Sakomelsky (1725–1790) — General of the Russian Empire

== See also ==
- Meller
