= Błotnica (river) =

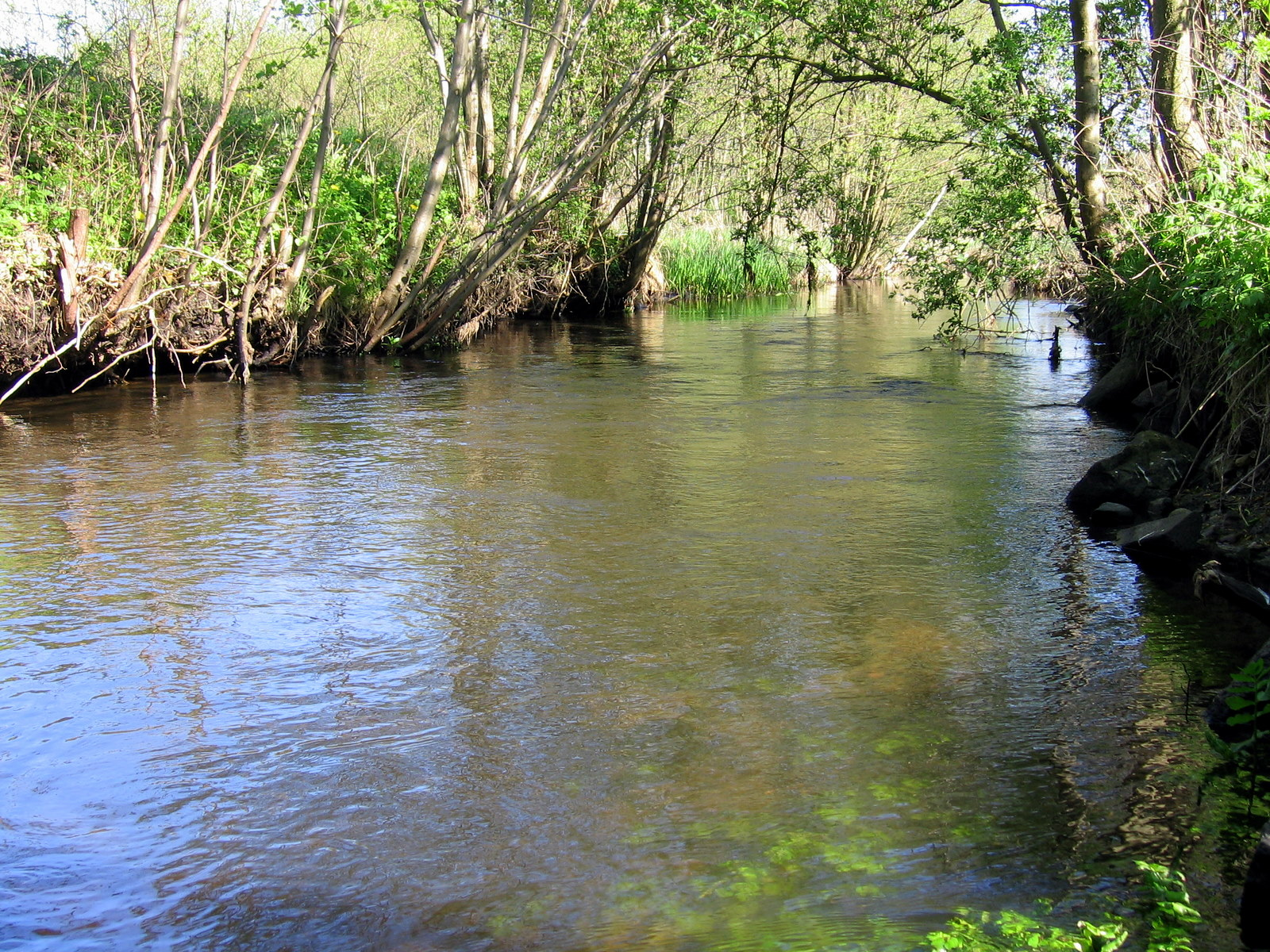
- River Błotnica, near Błotnica, West Pomeranian Voivodeship

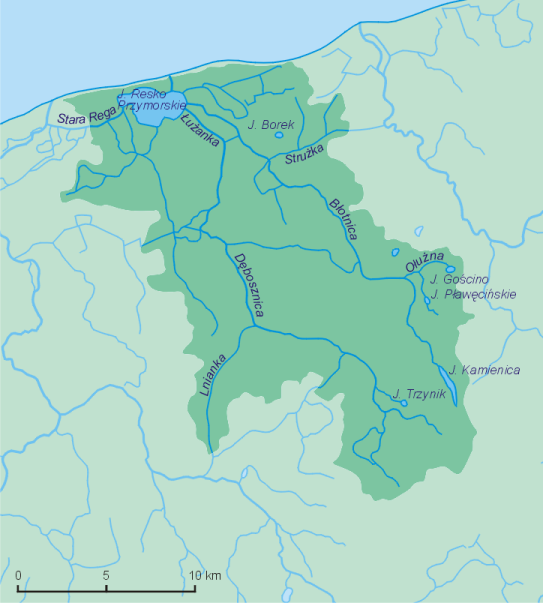

Location
- Country: Poland

Physical characteristics
- Source
  - location: Kamienica Lake
- Mouth
  - location: Baltic Sea
  - coordinates: 54°08′40″N 15°24′08″E
- Length: 26.7 km (16.6 mi)

Błotnica is a small river of north-western Poland. It is the main inflow and outflow of Resko Przymorskie lake. It flows into the Baltic Sea at Dźwirzyno. It is 26.7 km in length.

== Outlet ==
In 1948, lake Resko Przymorskie was described as the mouth of the river. The lake has a direct connection to the Baltic Sea, which according to the sources is part of the Mudguard. In 2006, the Committee on The Names of Towns and Objects of Physiographic as the mouth of the River Błotnica determined the mouth of the fist into the Baltic Sea. Similarly, on the Map of the Hydrographic Division of Poland from October 2007 made by the Department of Hydrography and Morphology of the River Troughs IMGW on the order of the Minister of Environment of the Republic of Poland, the fistula appears under the name Błotnica. On some map this thud appears under the name Resko Canal.

The name Błotnica was officially introduced in 1948, replacing the previous German name of the river – Spie Bach.

== Fauna ==
According to the data of the regional water management board, the dominant fish species in the waters of the Fenders are: brook trout, migratory trout. The other species of fish found in Błotnica and lake Tenement are: weave, white-fin head, thorn, roach, bream, European eel, European perch, pike.

== Water quality ==
In 2006, an assessment of the quality of the waters at the bridge near the village of Nowogardek was carried out at 4 km from the mouth of the river, where the waters of the river were assessed as 3rd class quality.

In 2008, quality studies of mudguard waters were conducted at the estuary point to the Sea Ruska. As a result, physio-chemical elements were assessed in Class II, biological elements were grade III and the ecological status was moderate. The overall two-stage assessment found that the waters of the Mudguard were poor.

In 2011, a water quality assessment was carried out at the test and measurement point at the estuary to the Nautical Site, where the good potential of biological elements, the good potential of physic-chemical and hydro morphological elements and good ecological potential were assessed.
