= Groß Schacksdorf-Simmersdorf =

Groß Schacksdorf-Simmersdorf Tšěšojce-Žymjerojce
- Municipality
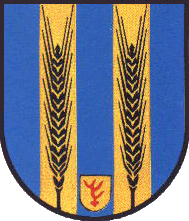
- Coat of arms

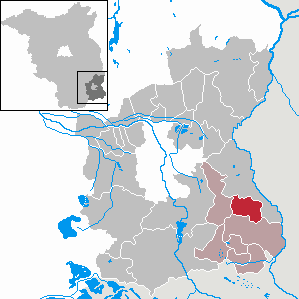
- Location of Groß Schacksdorf-Simmersdorf; Tšěšojce-Žymjerojce within Spree-Neiße district
- Interactive map of Groß Schacksdorf-Simmersdorf; Tšěšojce-Žymjerojce
- Location within Germany Location within Brandenburg
- Coordinates: 51°41′11″N 14°37′30″E
- Country: Germany
- State: Brandenburg
- District: Spree-Neiße
- Municipal assoc.: Döbern-Land

Government
  - Mayor (2024–29): Kirsten Schütz

Area
  - Total: 25.11 km^{2} (9.70 sq mi)
- Elevation: 85 m (279 ft)

Population (2025-12-31)
  - Total: 724
  - Density: 28.8/km^{2} (74.7/sq mi)
- Time zone: UTC+01:00 (CET)
  - Summer (DST): UTC+02:00 (CEST)
- Postal codes: 03149
- Dialling codes: 035695
- Vehicle registration: SPN

Groß Schacksdorf-Simmersdorf (Lower Sorbian: Tšěšojce-Žymjerojce) is a municipality in the district of Spree-Neiße, in Lower Lusatia, Brandenburg, Germany.

== History ==
From 1815 to 1947, the constituent localities of Groß Schacksdorf-Simmersdorf were part of the Prussian Province of Brandenburg. From 1952 to 1990, they were part of the Bezirk Cottbus of East Germany. On 31 December 2001, the municipality of Groß Schacksdorf-Simmersdorf was formed by merging the municipalities of Groß Schacksdorf and Simmersdorf.

== Demography ==
Development of population since 1875 within the current Boundaries (Blue Line: Population; Dotted Line: Comparison to Population development in Brandenburg state; Grey Background: Time of Nazi Germany; Red Background: Time of communist East Germany)

Groß Schacksdorf-Simmersdorf: Population development
within the current boundaries (2013)

Year	Pop.	±% p.a.
1875	759	—
1890	684	−0.69%
1910	819	+0.90%
1925	778	−0.34%
1933	815	+0.58%
1939	843	+0.56%
1946	981	+2.19%
1950	990	+0.23%
1964	1,667	+3.79%
1971	1,642	−0.22%
1981	1,667	+0.15%
1985	1,637	−0.45%
1989	1,677	+0.61%
1990	1,736	+3.52%
1991	1,682	−3.11%
1992	1,649	−1.96%
1993	1,659	+0.61%
1994	1,613	−2.77%
1995	1,524	−5.52%
1996	1,473	−3.35%

Year	Pop.	±% p.a.
1997	1,457	−1.09%
1998	1,443	−0.96%
1999	1,465	+1.52%
2000	1,474	+0.61%
2001	1,386	−5.97%
2002	1,281	−7.58%
2003	1,252	−2.26%
2004	1,167	−6.79%
2005	1,109	−4.97%
2006	1,278	+15.24%
2007	1,331	+4.15%
2008	1,228	−7.74%
2009	1,145	−6.76%
2010	1,070	−6.55%
2011	1,098	+2.62%
2012	1,138	+3.64%
2013	1,123	−1.32%
2014	1,220	+8.64%
2015	1,233	+1.07%
2016	1,114	−9.65%

== People ==
- Heinrich Sigismund von der Heyde (1703-1765), Prussian general
