= Głowaczewo, Kołobrzeg County =

Głowaczewo
- Village
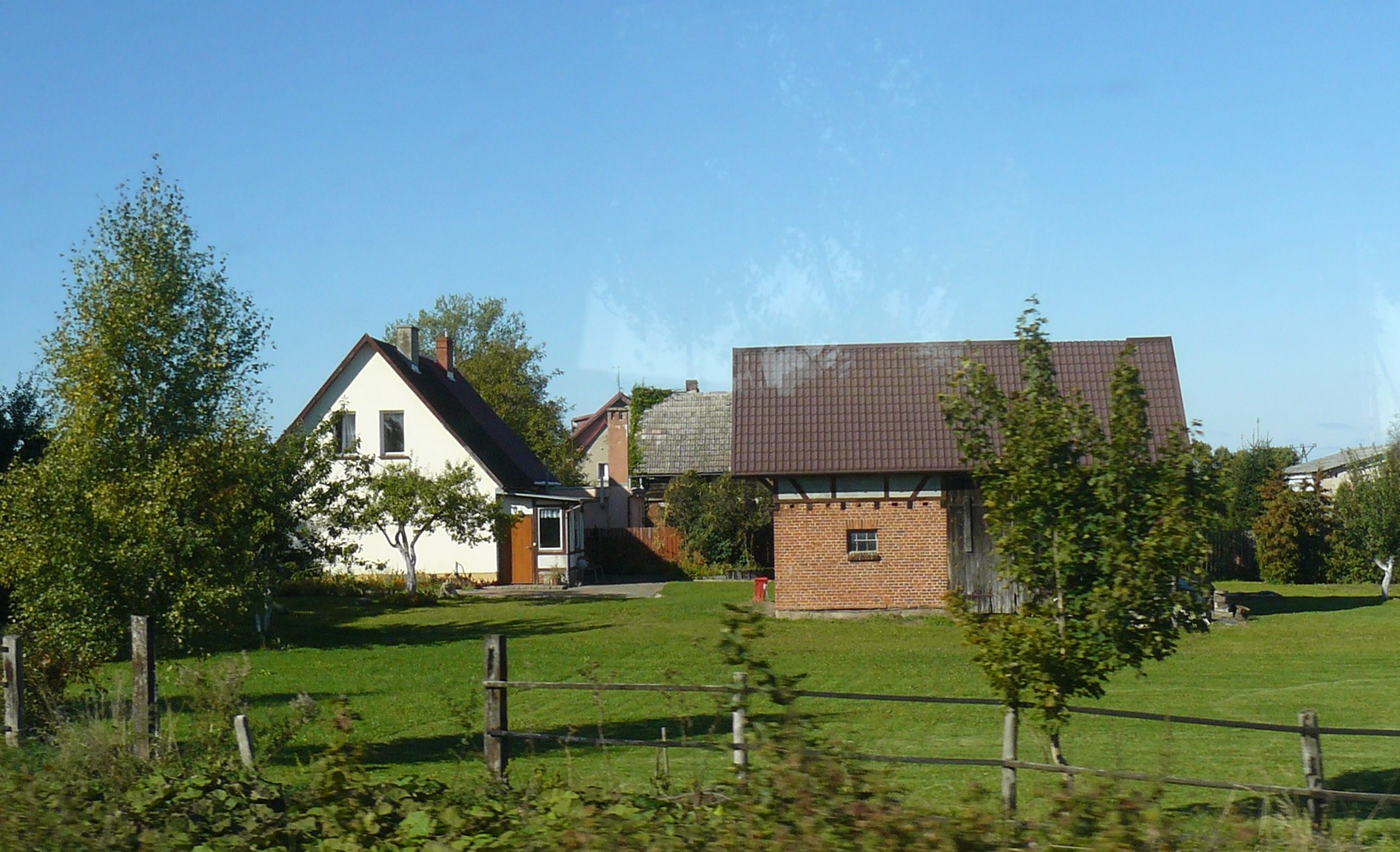

- Location within Poland
- Coordinates: 54°7′57″N 15°26′15″E
- Country: Poland
- Voivodeship: West Pomeranian
- County: Kołobrzeg
- Gmina: Kołobrzeg

Population
  - Total: 90
- Time zone: UTC+1 (CET)
  - Summer (DST): UTC+2 (CEST)
- Vehicle registration: ZKL

Głowaczewo [ɡwɔvaˈt͡ʂɛvɔ] (German: Papenhagen) is a village in the administrative district of Gmina Kołobrzeg, within Kołobrzeg County, West Pomeranian Voivodeship, in north-western Poland. It lies approximately 10 km (6 mi) south-west of Kołobrzeg and 98 km (61 mi) north-east of the regional capital Szczecin.

The village has a population of 90.

== History ==
The area became part of the emerging Polish state under its first ruler Mieszko I around 967, and following Poland's fragmentation it formed part of the Duchy of Pomerania. During World War II, the German administration operated a forced labour subcamp of the Stalag II-D prisoner-of-war camp in the village.

== See also ==
- Dębosznica
