= Dubislav Friedrich von Platen =

German officer (1714–1787)

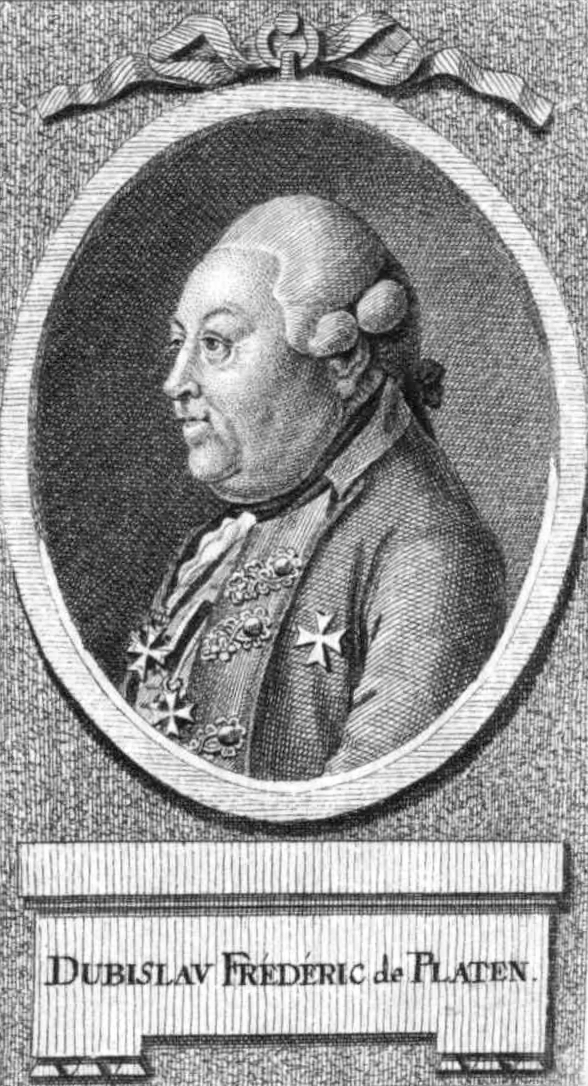
- Dubislav von Platen
- Born: 24 August 1714
- Died: 7 June 1787 (aged 72)
- Spouse: Sophia Susanna Charlotte von Cocceji
- Relatives: Hans Friedrich von Platen (father); Leopold Johann von Platen (brother)
- Military career
- Allegiance: Prussia
- Branch: Prussian Army
- Service years: 1701–1766
- Rank: General of the Cavalry
- Conflicts: War of the Austrian Succession; Second Silesian War; Seven Years' War; War of the Bavarian Succession
- Awards: Black Eagle Order; Equestrian statue of Frederick the Great; Knight, Order of Saint John; Order Pour le Merite

Dubislav Friedrich von Platen (23 August 1714 – 7 June 1787) was a Prussian officer in Frederick the Great's army. A cavalry general, he was also Governor of Königsberg, a Knight of the Order of Saint John, and a recipient of the Order of the Black Eagle. An active cavalry officer in all of the wars fought by Frederick—the War of Austrian Succession, the Second Silesian War, the Seven Years' War and, finally, the War of Bavarian Succession — he was commemorated on Equestrian statue of Frederick the Great in 1851 erected by Frederick's great-great nephew, Frederick William IV.

== Family ==
Friedrich von Platen was the son of general Hans Friedrich von Platen (21 January 1668 – 17 May 1743) and Hypolita Juliane von Podewils. His brother, General Leopold Johann von Platen, died on 22 December 1780. Friedrich von Platen married Sophia Susanna Charlotte von Cocceji, the daughter of Prussian Minister of Justice Samuel von Cocceji. A son and a daughter survived him.

== Military career ==
On 5 June 1723, at the request of his father, nine-year-old Friedrich von Platen was appointed cornet by King Friedrich Wilhelm I of Prussia; and on 18 August 1729, he became a second lieutenant; on 7 July 1730, he became a first lieutenant. On 11 August 1736, he received his own company in the Cuirassier Regiment "Gessler" No. 4. In the same year, he was accepted into the Johanniterorden in Sonnenburg. At the beginning of the First Silesian War (also called the War of Austrian Succession), he was Rittmeister, a captain of cavalry. His regiment was late for the Battle of Mollwitz but, in 1742, his regiment was involved in the thick of action at the Battle of Chotusitz. He was awarded the Pour le Mérite for his part in executing a successful retreat to Camenz. He was later promoted to major. In 1744 he fought in Bohemia and Moravia. On 22 May 1747, he was promoted to lieutenant colonel; in 1752, he was part of the famed Bayreuth Dragoons and, in 1755, second commander in the Dragoon Regiment "Normann", No. 1.

Promotions

- Cornet: 1723
- Second Lieutenant: 1731
- First (Premier) Lieutenant: 7 July 1730
- Rittmeister (captain of cavalry): 1741
- Major: 1744
- Lieutenant colonel: 22 May 1747
- Generalmajor: 4 March 1757
- Generalleutnant: 12 May 1759
- General of Cavalry: 7 June 1787

=== Action in the Seven Years' War ===
In the Seven Years' War, Friedrich von Platen's regiment went to Saxony in 1756. On 4 March 1757, Platen received the Dragoon Regiment "Langermann" No. 8 as Inhaber (Proprietor) and was promoted to generalmajor. On 15 April 1757 he fought at Gross-Jägersdorf. After the battle, the regiment was transferred to Pomerania to defend it against the Swedes and fought there at the siege of Stralsund. At the beginning of 1758, the regiment was transferred to Farther Pomerania, where it was deployed until June against the Russians. He fought on 25 August at the Battle of Zorndorf, where two of his sons died. After the Russian retreat, the regiment drove back troops from such Russian-occupied Pomeranian towns as Gollnow and Greifenberg. He then moved north against the Swedes and his regiment occupied Prenzlau after the Battle of Pasewalk in December. On 17 January 1759, he took part in the capture of Demmin, after which he was again deployed against the Russians, this time in the Stolp area.

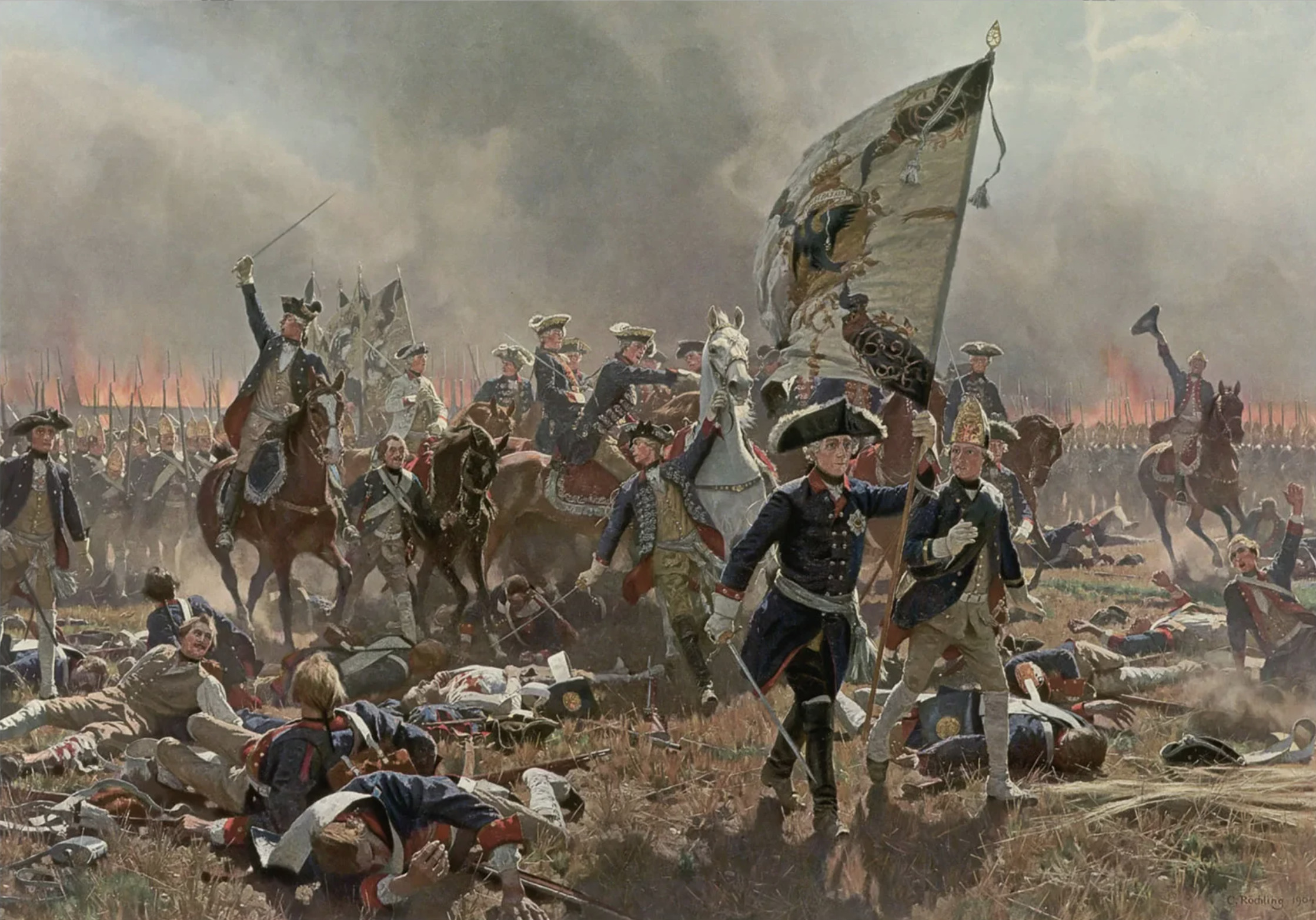
Frederick II at the Battle of Zorndorf, where two of Platen's sons were killed.

On 12 May 1759, Platen was promoted to generalleutnant, and was given command of the cavalry in the army of Prince Henry, the King's brother, operating in Saxony. The prince sent Platen on a successful marauding expedition with Frederick William von Kleist to the Bamberg area; afterward, Platen joined the King's army for the Prussian loss at Kunersdorf. In May 1760, he was sent, with General Friedrich Wilhelm Quirin von Forcade de Biaix, to the Pomeranian Neumark, with instructions to halt the advance of General Gottlieb Heinrich Totleben and his Russian army into Prussia. Subsequently, Platen was ordered to Landsberg to block the approach of the Russians and Austrians into Silesia and, most importantly, to defend the city of Breslau. Despite his efforts, in October 1760, the Russians under command of Totleben and Ivan Chernyshyov, and the Austrian army commanded by Franz Moritz von Lacy, occupied Berlin.

After the withdrawal of the Russians and Austrians from Berlin, Platen rejoined the King's main army and fought on 3 November at the Battle of Torgau. On 10 September 1761, he marched with the army to Poland to attack the Russian supply depots. He destroyed the Russian magazine in Köblin. On 15 September, he met a large Russian group of 5,000 wagons and 4,000 men near a monastery in Göstin. Joined by battalions from the Regiments "von Rothenburg", "von Arnim", "Görne" and "von Wunsch", he captured a large Russian magazine. From there, he proceeded to Posen, where he captured another magazine on 17 September.

Meanwhile, the Russians had besieged Kolberg for the third time, and had thwarted all Prussian relief efforts. In an action at Landsberg, with the principal bridge over the Warta river destroyed, Platen's troops crossed the river with the help of pontoons and rafts. At Körlin, on 30 September, he was able to recapture from the Russians an intact bridge over the Parsęta river, taking 200 prisoners in the action. From there, he attempted to reach the besieged fortress by marching along the Parsęta shore. After a three-hour battle 8 kilometers (5 mi) southwest of Kolberg, though, the Russian forces commanded by Pyotr Rumyantsev stopped him at the village of Spie. On 17 October, he tried to break through to Gollnow with 5,500 men to secure supplies from there, but the Russian general William Fermor stopped him in an artillery duel at the bridge over the Ihna. Ultimately, when he could not relieve the fortress, Kolberg had to capitulate on 16 December 1761 and its garrison entered into Russian captivity.

In January 1762, Platen returned to Saxony to the army of Prince Henry's army, where his regiment was stationed at Pegau and Zeitz and had no part in the fighting of the year.

=== War of the Bavarian Succession ===
In the War of Bavarian Succession, he commanded a corps in the army of Prince Heinrich, with whom he advanced on Prague, Peterswalde, Leitmeritz, and Budin an der Eger. In September 1786 he received from Frederick William II the Black Eagle Order. At the same time, the King appointed Platen as governor of Königsberg, an office which Platen did not want, but which he was persuaded to accept.

On 20 May 1787 he became general of the cavalry and died shortly afterward on 7 June 1787. His name was perpetuated on the front of the Rheinsberg obelisk and on one of the honorary plates on the Equestrian statue of Frederick the Great established by Frederick's great great nephew, Frederick William IV of Prussia.
