= Ivan Ivanovich Möller-Sakomelsky =

Russian general (1725–1790)

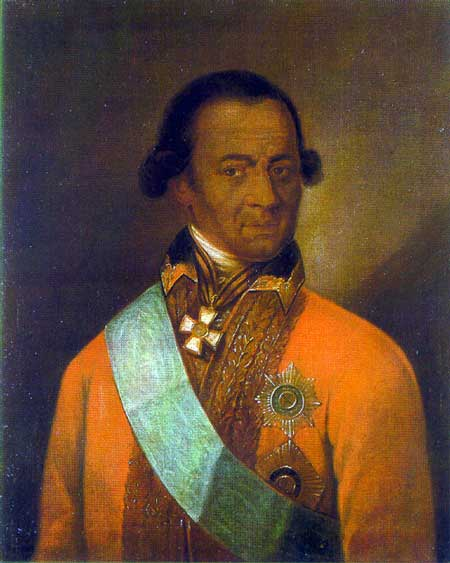
Portrait of German-Russian General Ivan Ivanovich Möller-Sakomelsky, as identified by Natalya Teletova; other studies identify it as a portrait of Abram Petrovich Gannibal

Baron (from 1789) Johann Möller-Sakomelsky (Russian: Иван Иванович Меллер-Закомельский, Ivan Ivanovich Möller-Zakomelsky; 1725 – 10 October 1790) was a General of the Russian Empire. An artillery expert, he gained fame during the Turkish Wars of the late 18th century.

== Biography ==
Born Johann Möller to a family of Lutheran German burghers, he entered the Russian artillery in 1739 as a rank private, and by 1752 had been commissioned as an officer. By 1759 he was a lieutenant-colonel, and saw action in the Seven Years' War. At the Siege of Kolberg in 1761 he gained distinction as commander of the artillery under Rumyantsev, and was later entrusted with organizing and commanding one of the army's first light infantry units. In the following years Möller would continue to be promoted, reaching the rank of lieutenant-general in April 1773.

As a senior officer of Russia's artillery branch, Möller was made a member of the Main Chancellery for Artillery and Fortifications in 1772 and soon became its preeminent member. After the death of Prince Grigory Orlov in 1783 Möller succeeded him as General Feldzeugmeister, the titular head of the Imperial Army's artillery corps (he had been de facto head for several years before that), and was promoted to the rank of general-in-chief.

With the outbreak of war with the Ottoman Empire in 1787, Prince Grigory Potemkin asked Möller to join his field army based out of Ekaterinoslav, and assist in the planning of besieging Ochakov. After the strategic fortress was taken, Möller was awarded with both the Orders of St. Andrew and St. George in the 2nd class alongside the title of baron.

During the campaign of 1790, he was given command of his own field corps assigned to seize the fortress of Kiliya. During an attempted storming of the city, Möller was mortally wounded and died on October 10. General Ivan Gudovich took over command and captured the city a few days later.

Möller-Sakomelsky was considered a critical reformer of Russia's artillery forces in the 1770s and 80's. He oversaw the recasting of guns so that they were significantly lighter and more easily moved in battle, but not any less powerful. He removed weapon types like the Secret howitzer from service to simplify logistics and training. In June 1788 he composed a Supplement for gunners explaining how to best use their weapons against Turkish forces, updating tactics that had not been revised in three decades.

The name Möller-Sakomelsky came from the general's elevation to the rank of baron in 1789, Sakomelsky being derived from his granted estate in the volost of Zakomelsky located near Usvyaty. He had numerous offspring, two of whom became prominent generals in Russian Army. Yegor (1767-1830) was a cavalry commander during the Napoleonic Wars, participating in many critical battles of the invasion in 1812. His elder brother Pyotr (1755-1823) was Minister of War from 1819 to 1823. The family continued to provide officers to the military service up until the Russian Revolution.

== See also ==
- Meller-Zakomelsky
- Meller-Zakomelsky (family)

== Sources ==
- Военная энциклопедия / Под ред. В. Ф. Новицкого и др. — СПб.: т-во И. В. Сытина, 1911—1915. — Т. 15.
- Бароны Меллер-Закомельские герба собственного (по-белорусски)
