= Arsenal master (Russia) =

Imperial Russian naval rank

Arsenal Master Zeugmeister Цейхмейстер
- Country: Russia
- Service branch: Imperial Russian Navy
- Abolished: 1831
- Equivalent ranks: Commander-captain

Upper Arsenal Master Oberzeugmeister Обер-цейхмейстер
- Country: Russia
- Service branch: Imperial Russian Navy
- Equivalent ranks: Rear admiral; Counter admiral

Zeugmeister (Russian: Цейхмейстер, romanized: Tseikhmeister) or arsenal master is a rank of the Imperial Russian Navy in the 18th century, meaning a chief of naval artillery. The rank was introduced under Peter the Great. Since 1831, this rank was replaced by the position of Inspector of Naval Artillery. An arsenal master's functions contain:

- Training ship gunners.
- Distributing gunners among the fleet's ships.
- Supplying ships with artillery and ammunition.
- Inspecting the condition of ship artillery and coastal defence and fortification.
- Performing the duties of a flagship gunner under the fleet commander.
- Directing the artillery of large naval bases.

The position of zeugmeister corresponded to the rank of commander-captain. A zeugmeister subordinated to an oberzeugmeister (Russian: обер-цейхмейстер, romanized: ober-tseikhmeister; upper arsenal master), who was supreme chief of naval artillery and was equivalent to a rear admiral or a counter admiral.

== Sources ==
- Isanin, N. N. [in Russian] (1987). "Цейхмейстер". Морской энциклопедический справочник. Vol. 2. Leningrad: Судостроение. p. 401.
