= Samuel von Cocceji =

Prussian jurist and statesman (1679–1755)

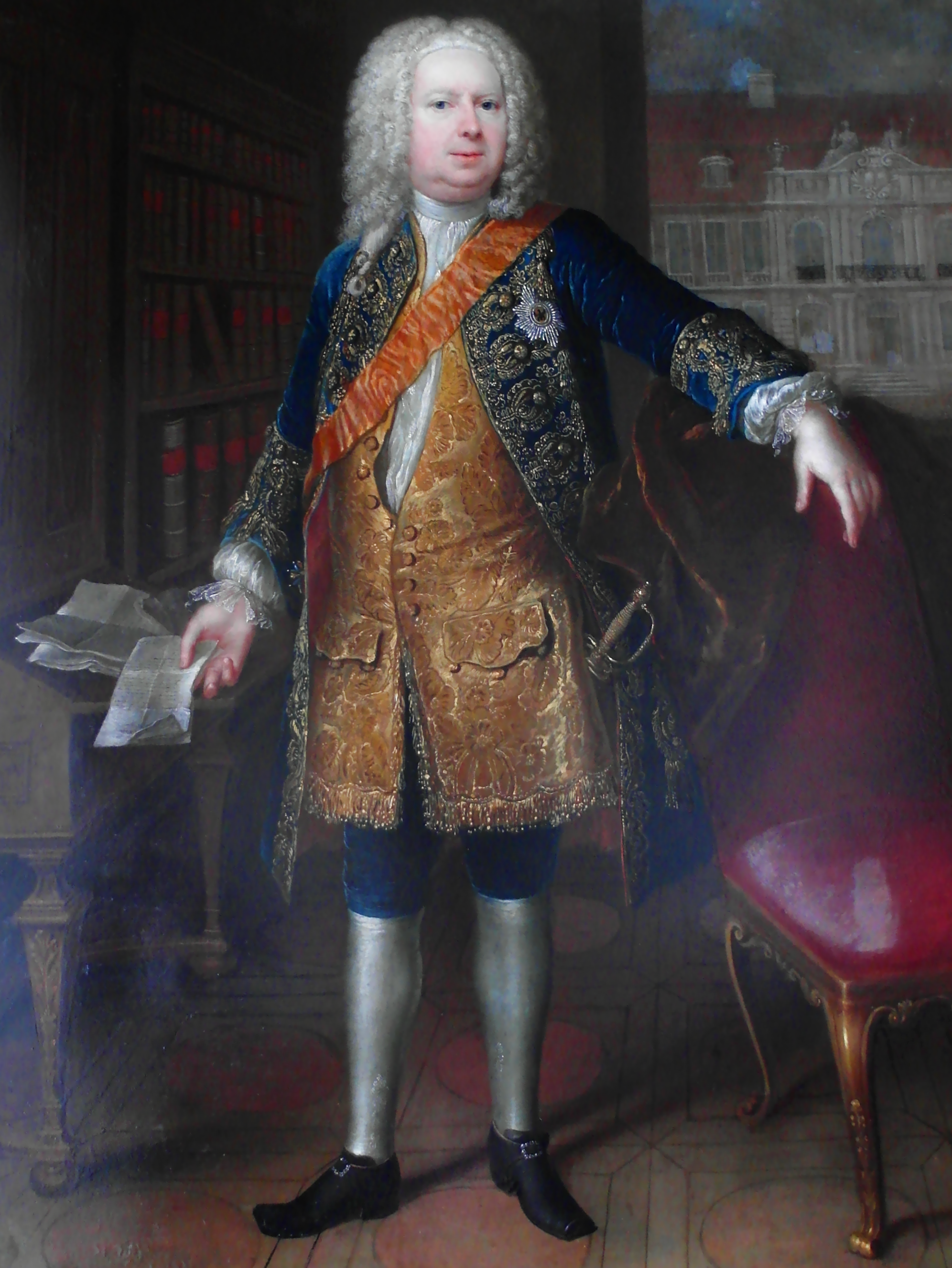
- Portrait by Anna Rosina de Gasc (1737)

Prussian Minister of Justice
- In office 1737–1755
- Preceded by: Inaugural holder
- Succeeded by: Philipp Joseph von Jariges

Personal details
- Born: 20 October 1679 Heidelberg
- Died: 4 October 1755 (aged 75) Berlin
- Parent: Heinrich von Cocceji (father)

Samuel Freiherr von Cocceji (pronounced kok-'tse-yi; 20 October 1679 – 4 October 1755) was a German official from the Electorate of the Palatinate who served Brandenburg-Prussia and the Kingdom of Prussia. He was the son of Heinrich von Cocceji.

== Early life ==
Cocceji was born on 20 October 1679 in Heidelberg. Cocceji studied law with his father Heinrich von Cocceji, received his doctorate in 1699 and embarked on a three-year educational trip through Italy, France, England and Holland.

== Career ==
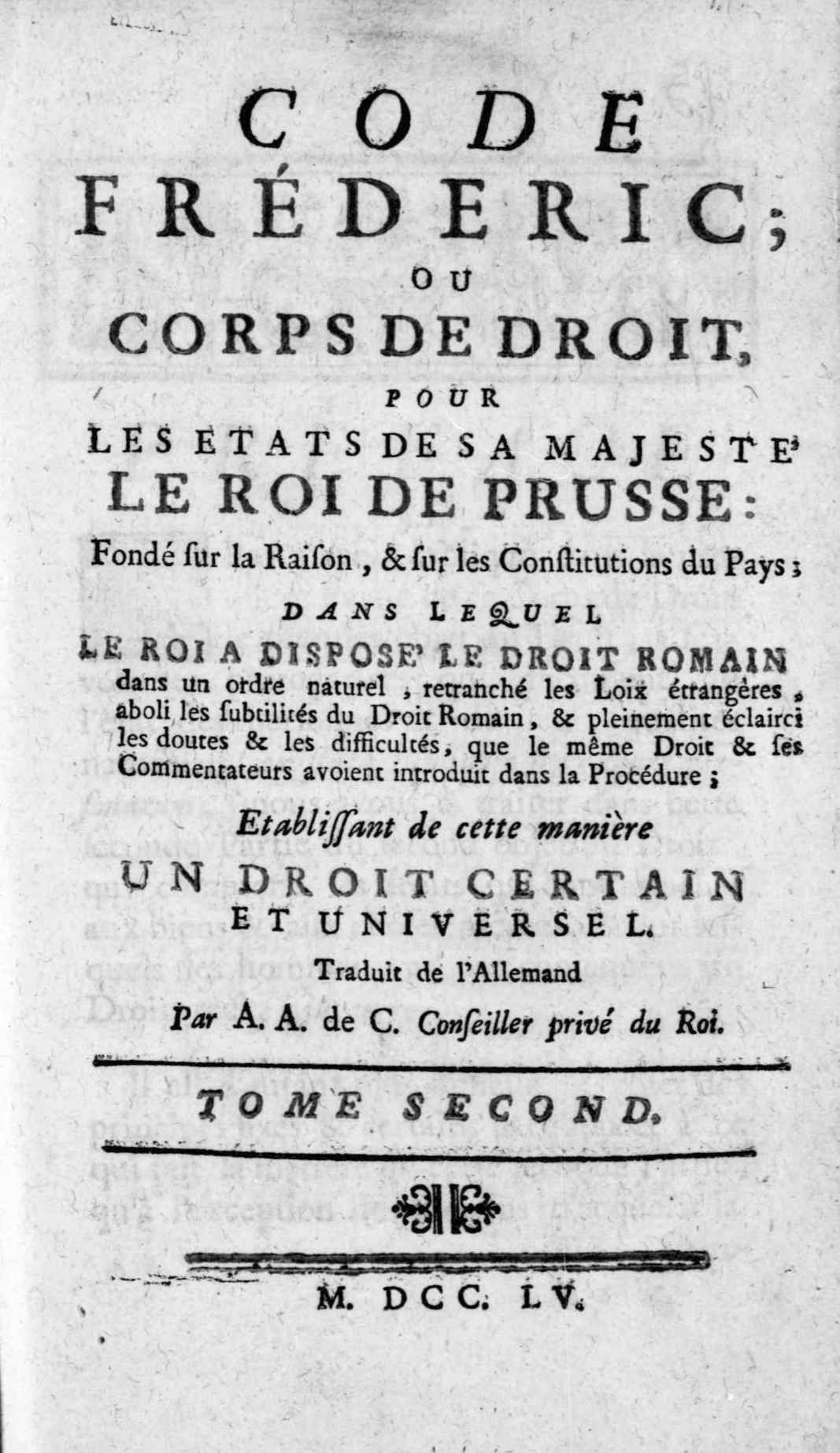
Project des Corporis Juris Fridericiani, 1752

In 1702, after his European travels, he became a professor of law at Viadrina University in Frankfurt (Oder). By 1723 he was Kammergerichtspräsident (president of the Kammergericht) and from 19 September 1731 to 1737 he served as the president of the Oberappellationsgericht zu Berlin (Court of Appeal in Berlin), the highest court of Prussia.

In 1738 and 1739, Cocceji was chairman of the Prussian justice department, before he was made Großkanzler (grand chancellor) in 1747. King Frederick II of Prussia appointed Cocceji to lead the legal reorganization of annexed Silesia. Cocceji subsequently reformed the legal system of all of Prussia. Between 1747 and 1751 he conducted a systematic review of Prussian courts, first in Pomerania and later in Brandenburg and other provinces. These reforms reduced long-standing judicial backlogs and contributed to the development of the Codex Fridericianus Pomeranicus (1747) and Codex Fridericianus Marchicus (1748), which simplified judicial procedure. The reforms also strengthened the professionalization of the judiciary by requiring legal education and state approval for judges.

== Personal life ==
Cocceji married Johanna Charlotte von Bechefer, daughter of the Prussian Lieutenant general Jakob von Bechefer. Together they had three daughters and three sons, including:

- Sophia Susanna Charlotte von Cocceji (c. 1720–1794), who married Gen. Dubislav Friedrich von Platen
- Karl Ludwig von Cocceji (1724–1808), who became senior district president of Glogau.
- Johann Heinrich Friedrich von Cocceji (1726–c. 1799), who became a Prussian colonel and royal adjutant general.
- Carl Friedrich Ernst von Cocceji (1728–1780), a general in the service of the last King of Poland, Stanislaus II
- Luise von Cocceji, who never married and was maid of honor to Prussian Queen Elisabeth Christine.
- Amalie Charlotte Henriette von Cocceji (1729–1757), who married Baron Mathieu II von Vernezobre-Laurieux (1721–1782).

Cocceji died on 4 October 1755.
