= Cocceius (skipper) =

Scientific classification
- Kingdom: Animalia
- Phylum: Arthropoda
- Class: Insecta
- Order: Lepidoptera
- Family: Hesperiidae
- Genus: Cocceius

Genus of insects

Cocceius is a genus of skippers in the family Hesperiidae.
