= Heinrich von Cocceji =

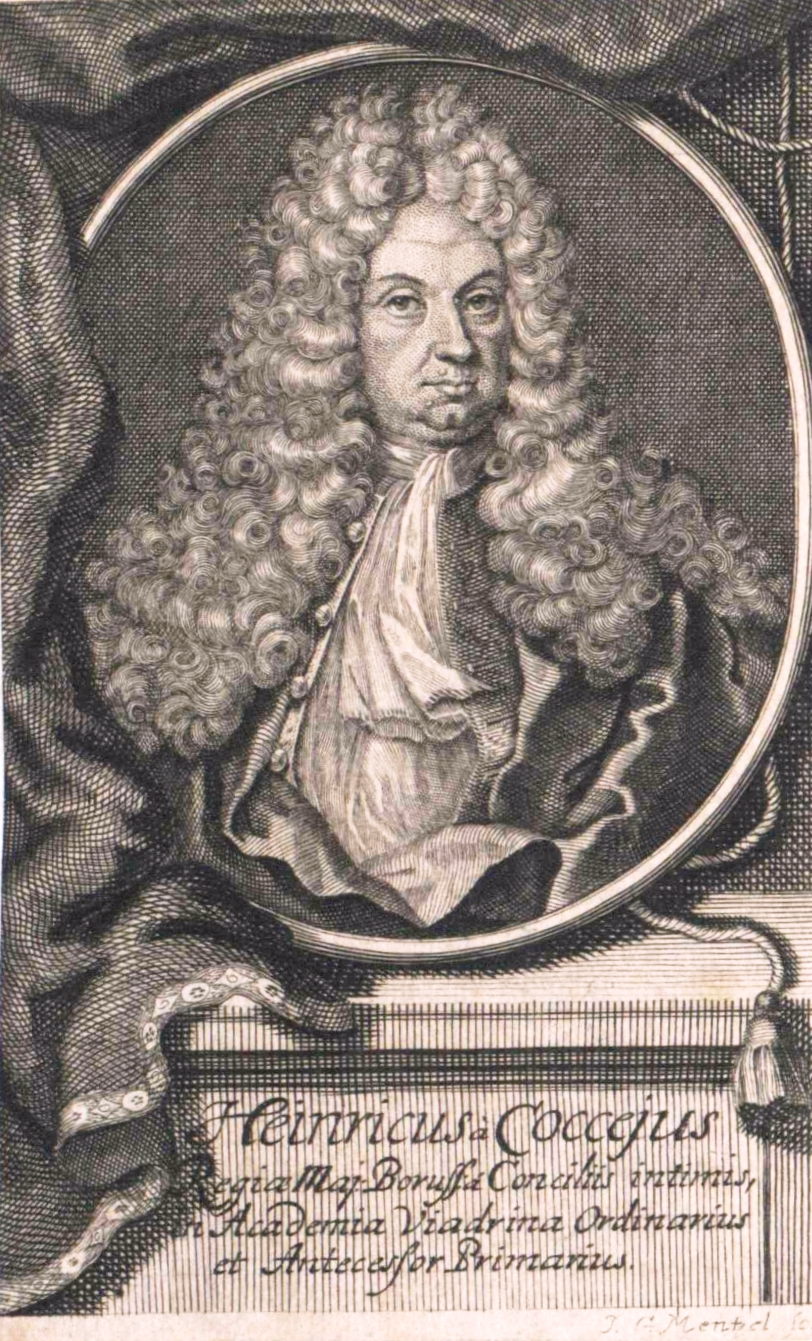
Heinrich Freiherr von Cocceji

Heinrich Freiherr von Cocceji (25 March 1644 – 18 August 1719) was a German jurist from Bremen. He studied in Leiden and Oxford and was appointed professor of law at Heidelberg (1672) and in Utrecht (1688). Named Geheimrat and marquis, he became ordinary professor in the faculty of law at Frankfurt (Oder), where he later died.

Cocceji's main opus, the Juris publici prudentia (Frankf. 1695) was for a long time the main compendium for German state law. Widely circulated is his Anatomia juris gentium (Frankf. 1718). His other works include Juris feudalis hypomnemata (Frankf. 1702, 1715, 1727) and Disputatio Juridica, De concursu plurium jurisdictionum in eodem loco (Heidelberg n.d.).
