= Dźwirzyno =

- Village
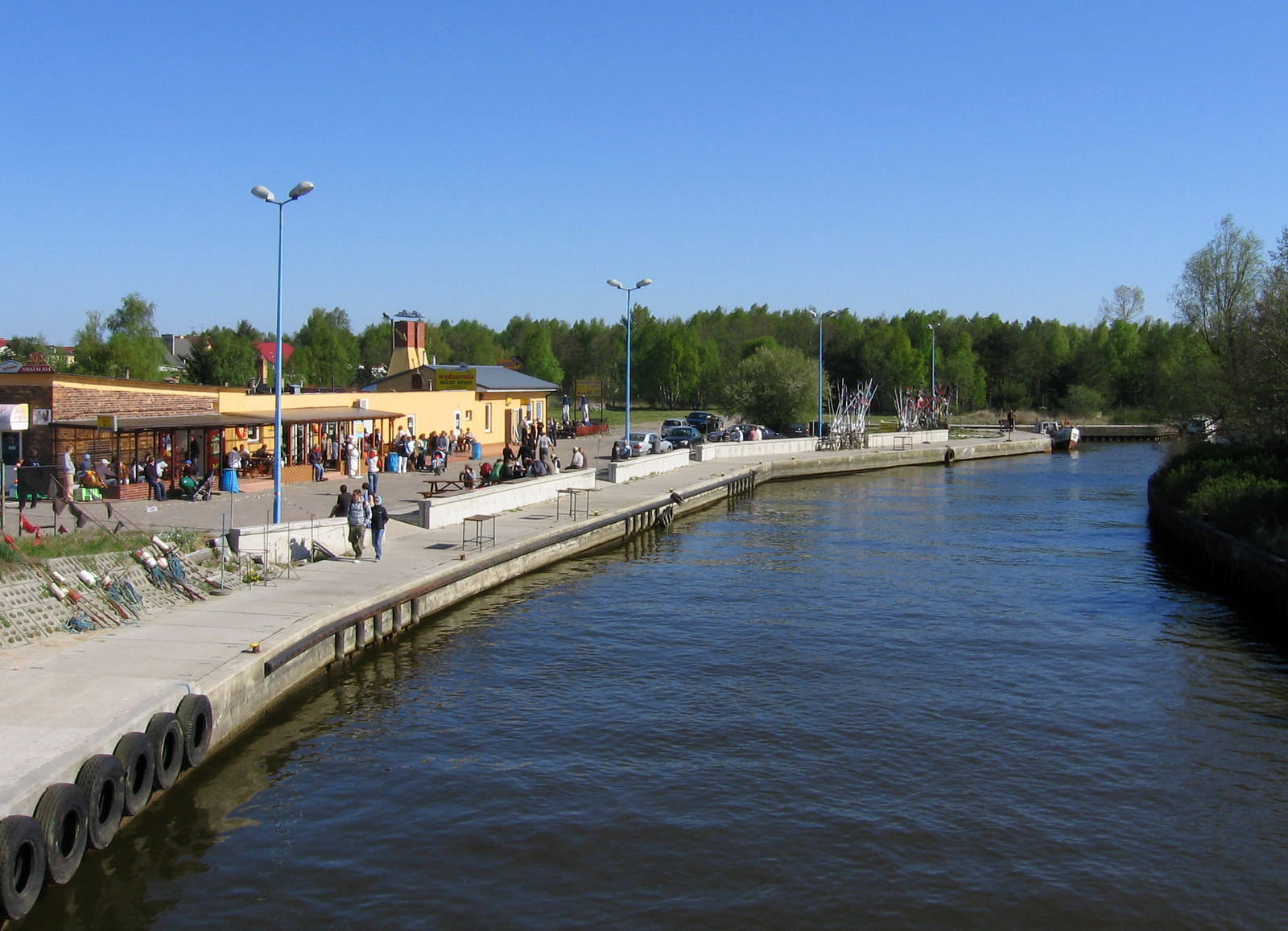
- Old fishing wharf

- Location within Poland
- Coordinates: 54°9′25″N 15°23′45″E
- Country: Poland
- Voivodeship: West Pomeranian
- County: Kołobrzeg
- Gmina: Kołobrzeg
- Population: 699
- Postal code: 78-131
- Area code: +48 94
- Car plates: ZKL
- Website: www.dzwirzyno.pl

Dźwirzyno [d͡ʑviˈʐɨnɔ] (German: Kolberger Deep) is a village in the administrative district of Gmina Kołobrzeg, within Kołobrzeg County, West Pomeranian Voivodeship, in north-western Poland. It lies approximately 12 km (7 mi) west of Kołobrzeg and 98 km (61 mi) north-east of the regional capital Szczecin.

The village has a population of 580.
