= Błotnica, West Pomeranian Voivodeship =

Błotnica
- Village
- Location within Poland
- Coordinates: 54°6′19″N 15°31′6″E
- Country: Poland
- Voivodeship: West Pomeranian
- County: Kołobrzeg
- Gmina: Kołobrzeg
- Elevation: 10 m (33 ft)
- Population: 105

Błotnica [bwɔtˈnit͡sa] (German: Spie) is a village in the administrative district of Gmina Kołobrzeg, within Kołobrzeg County, West Pomeranian Voivodeship, in north-western Poland. It lies approximately 8 km (5 mi) south-west of Kołobrzeg and 99 km (62 mi) north-east of the regional capital Szczecin.

The village has a population of 105.

== See also ==
History of Pomerania
