= Bardy-Świelubie =

Slavic-Scandinavian archaeological site in Pomerania

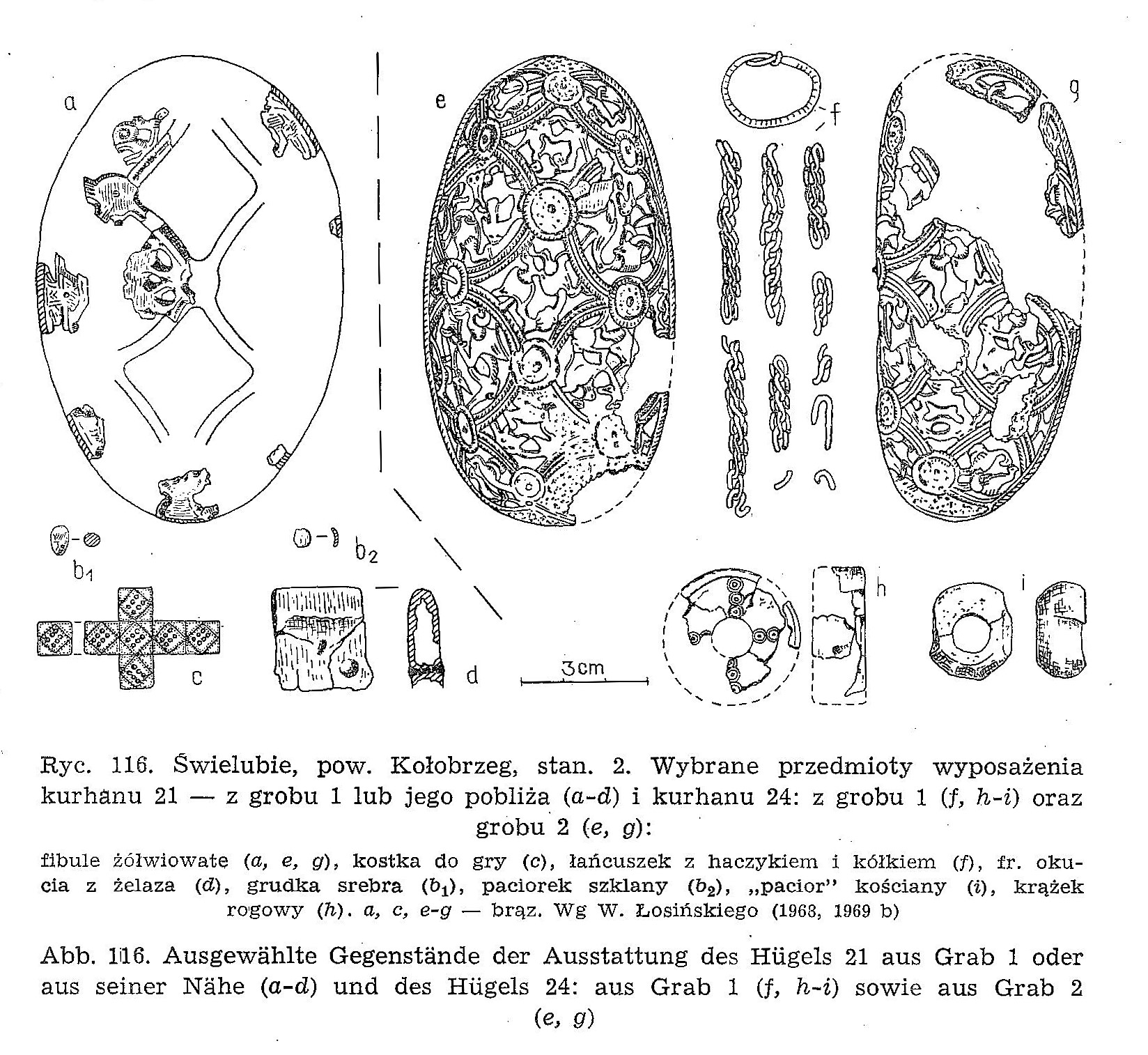
- Findings from tumuli in Świelubie
- Type: Settlement
- Periods: Early Middle Ages
- Location: Gmina Dygowo, Kołobrzeg County, West Pomeranian Voivodeship, Poland

History
- Built: before 800
- Abandoned: late 9th century

Bardy-Świelubie (or Bartin-Zwillipp) near modern Kołobrzeg, Poland was a Viking Age Slavic-Scandinavian settlement on the southern Baltic coast. It is named after the modern villages of Bardy and Świelubie.

Bardy-Świelubie differs from other emporia: The location is rather far from the coastline, and Bardy was built before 800, making it one of the earliest Slavic burghs in the coastal area. Archaeological findings indicate participation in Carolingian trade, but evidence of non-Slavic presence is missing for this early stage.

In the 9th century, Scandinavians (men and women) settled the site, as is evident from the adjacent tumulus grave field in Świelubie. The Scandinavian colony is estimated to have held between 50 and 70 inhabitants. The exact site of the settlement, whether inside or close to the burgh, is not yet determined. A Slavic burgh as a predecessor for a Scandinavian settlement is not observed elsewhere, with the possible, but not yet evident, exception of Wolin.

Bardy-Świelubie was vacated in the late 9th century, when the Slavic grad of Kołobrzeg became the new center of the region.

== See also ==
- Pomerania during the Early Middle Ages
- Viking Age
