= Miechęcino =

- Village
- Location within Poland
- Coordinates: 54°6′46″N 15°44′44″E
- Country: Poland
- Voivodeship: West Pomeranian
- County: Kołobrzeg
- Gmina: Dygowo

Miechęcino [mjɛxɛnˈt͡ɕinɔ] (German: Mechenthin) is a village in the administrative district of Gmina Dygowo, within Kołobrzeg County, West Pomeranian Voivodeship, in north-western Poland. It lies approximately 3 km (2 mi) south-east of Dygowo, 14 km (9 mi) south-east of Kołobrzeg, and 109 km (68 mi) north-east of the regional capital Szczecin.

For the history of the region, see History of Pomerania.
