= Dębogard =

- Village
- Location within Poland
- Coordinates: 54°6′59″N 15°40′16″E
- Country: Poland
- Voivodeship: West Pomeranian
- County: Kołobrzeg
- Gmina: Dygowo

Dębogard [dɛmˈbɔɡart] (German: Damgardt) is a village in the administrative district of Gmina Dygowo, within Kołobrzeg County, West Pomeranian Voivodeship in north-western Poland.It lies approximately 4 km (2 mi) south-west of Dygowo, 9 km (6 mi) south-east of Kołobrzeg, and 106 km (66 mi) north-east of the regional capital Szczecin.
