= Gąskowo =

- Village
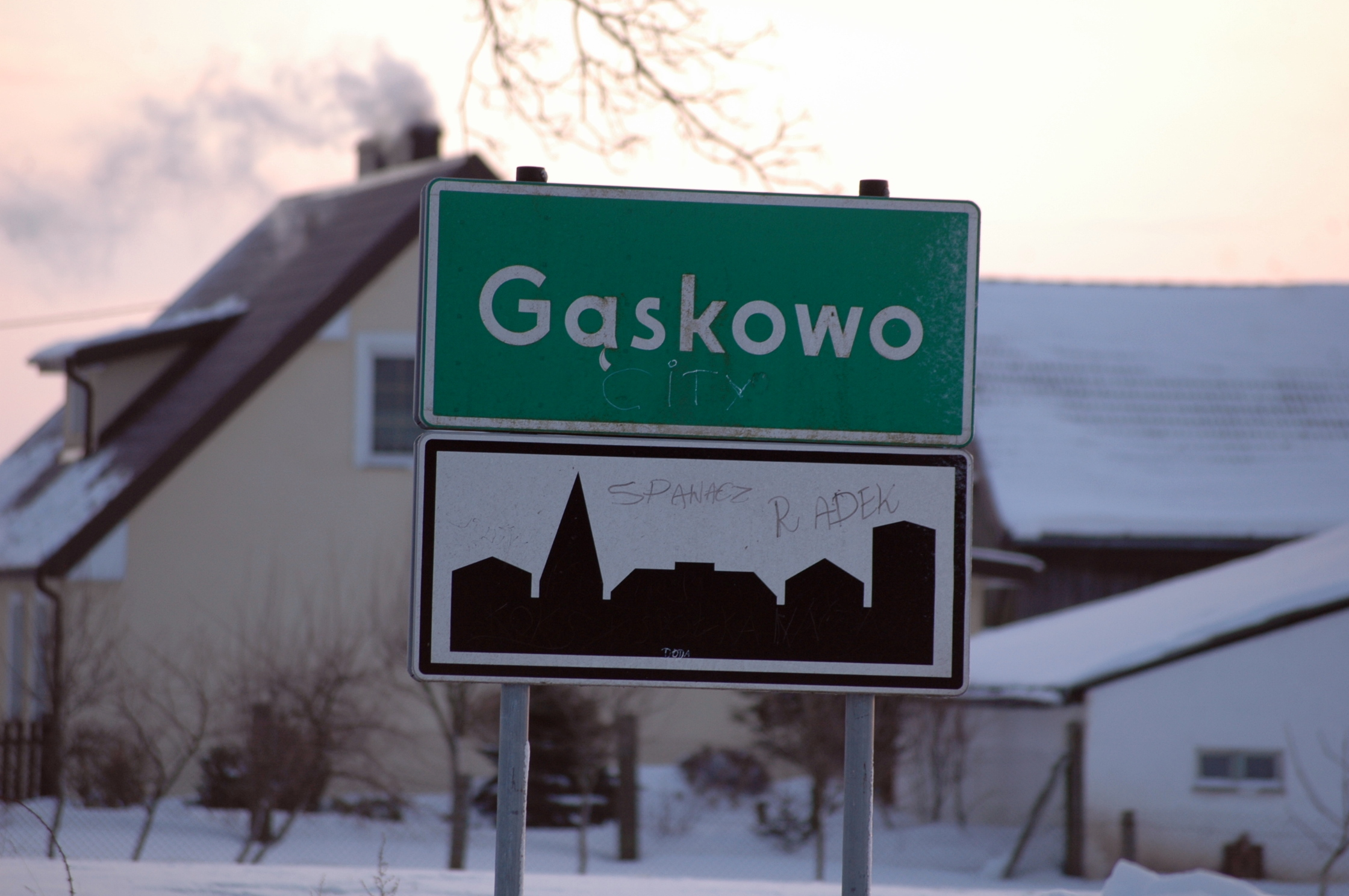

- Location within Poland
- Coordinates: 54°8′51″N 15°46′21″E
- Country: Poland
- Voivodeship: West Pomeranian
- County: Kołobrzeg
- Gmina: Dygowo

Gąskowo [ɡɔ̃sˈkɔvɔ] (German: Ganzkow) is a village in the administrative district of Gmina Dygowo, within Kołobrzeg County, West Pomeranian Voivodeship, in north-western Poland.It lies approximately 4 km (2 mi) north-east of Dygowo, 14 km (9 mi) east of Kołobrzeg, and 113 km (70 mi) north-east of the regional capital Szczecin.
