= Łykowo =

- Village
- Location within Poland
- Coordinates: 54°6′9″N 15°50′8″E
- Country: Poland
- Voivodeship: West Pomeranian
- County: Kołobrzeg
- Gmina: Dygowo
- Population (approx.): 100

Łykowo [wɨˈkɔvɔ] (German: Leikow) is a village in the administrative district of Gmina Dygowo, within Kołobrzeg County, West Pomeranian Voivodeship, in north-western Poland. It lies approximately 9 km (6 mi) south-east of Dygowo, 19 km (12 mi) east of Kołobrzeg, and 113 km (70 mi) north-east of the regional capital Szczecin.

The village has an approximate population of 100.

== Notable residents ==
- Alfred Nähring (1910–1991), German officer
