= Jazy, West Pomeranian Voivodeship =

Jazy
- Village
- Location within Poland
- Coordinates: 54°7′31″N 15°47′7″E
- Country: Poland
- Voivodeship: West Pomeranian
- County: Kołobrzeg
- Gmina: Dygowo

Jazy [ˈjazɨ] (German: Jaasde) is a village in the administrative district of Gmina Dygowo, within Kołobrzeg County, West Pomeranian Voivodeship, in north-western Poland.It lies approximately 5 km (3 mi) east of Dygowo, 15 km (9 mi) east of Kołobrzeg, and 112 km (70 mi) north-east of the regional capital Szczecin.
