= List of shipwrecks in November 1872 =

The list of shipwrecks in November 1872 includes ships sunk, foundered, grounded, or otherwise lost during November 1872.

== 1 November ==
List of shipwrecks: 1 November 1872
Ship	State	Description
Ada L. Harris	United States	The schooner was lost on Nantucket Shoals. crew saved.
Allegro	United Kingdom	The ship was driven ashore on "Winga". She was on a voyage from a Baltic port to London. She was refloated and taken into Gothenburg, Sweden in a waterlogged condition.
Anna	United Kingdom	The ship departed from Omoa, British Honduras for Glasgow, Renfrewshire. No further trace, presumed foundered with the loss of all hands.
Edmund	Norway	The barque was wrecked near Lysekil, Sweden. Her crew were rescued. She was on a voyage from Oulu, Grand Duchy of Finland to London.
Emerald Isle	United Kingdom	The schooner was driven ashore and wrecked at Whitefarland, Isle of Arran. She was on a voyage from Wexford to Glasgow, Renfrewshire.
Eudora	United Kingdom	The brig ran aground on the Longsand, in the North Sea off the coast of Essex. She was on a voyage from South Shields, County Durham to Messina, Sicily, Italy. She was refloated with the assistance of five smacks but sank off the Shipwash Sand, off the coast of Suffolk. Two of her crew were rescued, the rest were reported missing.
Fenella	United Kingdom	The ship ran aground and was wrecked at Newhaven, Sussex. Her crew were rescued. She was on a voyage from Ryde, Isle of Wight to Dover, Kent.
Flora	United Kingdom	The ship was wrecked on "Tilstarne". Her crew were rescued. She was on a voyage from a Baltic port to Newcastle upon Tyne, Northumberland.
Fremad	Norway	The ship was wrecked on the Jadder Reef. Her crew were rescued. she was on a voyage from Stettin, Germany to Newcastle upon Tyne.
Janet	United Kingdom	The schooner collided with Charity (United Kingdom) and was abandoned in the Dogger Bank. Her crew were rescued. Janet was on a voyage from Lybster, Caithness to Rotterdam, South Holland, Netherlands.
Moscou	Belgium	The steamship foundered off Skagen, Denmark with the loss of seven of her crew. Survivors were rescued by Wifsta Warf (Denmark). Moscou was on a voyage from Antwerp to Danzig, Germany.
Queen	United Kingdom	The ship was driven ashore and wrecked at Portsmouth, Hampshire.
Stanislaus	France	The smack sank off Harfleur, Seine-Inférieure. Her crew were rescued by the steamship William Bankes (United Kingdom).

== 2 November ==
List of shipwrecks: 2 November 1872
Ship	State	Description
Anglesea Lass	United Kingdom	The brig was wrecked at Paranaguá, Brazil with the loss of three of her crew. She was on a voyage from Lisbon, Portugal to Antonina, Brazil.
Ariel	United Kingdom	The brig ran aground on the South Galloper Sand and was abandoned by her crew, who were rescued. She was on a voyage from Hartlepool, County Durham to Newhaven, Sussex, or from Shoreham-by-Sea, Sussex to Hartlepool.
August	Germany	The ship ran aground at Egerö, Norway. She was on a voyage from Leith, Lothian, United Kingdom to Stettin. She was refloated and resumed her voyage but put into Huntingslands Bay in a waterlogged condition.
Baltasara	Sweden	The ship sprang a leak and was run ashore near "Surup", Russia. She was on a voyage from Kramfors to a port on the east coast of England.
Banff	United Kingdom	The schooner was driven ashore and wrecked at Bawdsey, Suffolk. She was on a voyage from Hartlepool to Folkestone, Kent.
Caroline	Germany	The schooner was driven ashore and wrecked on "Hertzholm". She was on a voyage from Peterhead, Aberdeenshire, United Kingdom to Stettin.
Connivan	United Kingdom	The smack was driven ashore at Pwllgwaelod, Pembrokeshire and was severely damaged.
Industry	United Kingdom	The ship collided with Kinloch (United Kingdom) and sank off Granton, Lothian. Her crew were rescued. She was on a voyage from Inverkeithing, Fife to Leith, Lothian.
Isabella Northcote	Norway	The ship was wrecked on the Ecrehos Rock, off Jersey, Channel Islands. Her eighteen crew were rescued. She was on a voyage from Montreal, Quebec, Canada to London, United Kingdom.
Jeune Pauline	United Kingdom	The lugger was driven ashore near Dunkirk, Nord with the loss of three of her crew.
John Robinson	United Kingdom	The full-rigged ship was driven ashore near Ronehamn, Gotland, Sweden. She was on a voyage from Kronstadt, Russia to Hull, Yorkshire.
Lady Leighton	United Kingdom	The ship departed from Caen, Calvados, France for Goole, Yorkshire. No further trace, presumed foundered with the loss of all hands.
Oceanica	United Kingdom	The full-rigged ship collided with the barque Suzeraine (United Kingdom) and sank 50 nautical miles (93 km) off Cape Wrath, Caithness. Her crew were rescued by Suzeraine. Oceanica was on a voyage from South Shields to Bombay, India.
Queen Victoria	United Kingdom	The steamship ran aground at Jedda, Hejaz Vilayet. She was on a voyage from Liverpool, Lancashire to Calcutta, India. She was refloated and resumed her voyage.
Srathavon	United Kingdom	The ship departed from Montreal for the Clyde. No further trace, presumed foundered with the loss of all hands.
Teresina	United Kingdom	The ship was wrecked at Santa Anna, Mexico. There were at least five survivors.
Unnamed	United Kingdom	The brig ran aground on the Goodwin Sands, Kent and was wrecked. Her crew were rescued by a Ramsgate lugger.
Unnamed	Flag unknown	The steamship foundered 4 nautical miles (7.4 km) north east of Skagen, Denmark.
Unnamed	United Kingdom	The sloop was run down and sunk in the Firth of Forth by a steamship.

== 3 November ==
List of shipwrecks: 3 November 1872
Ship	State	Description
Chance	United Kingdom	The ship was abandoned in the Atlantic Ocean. Her crew were rescued. She was on a voyage from Pensacola, Florida, United States to Sunderland, County Durham.
Cyringey	United Kingdom	The ship was driven ashore at Le Conquet, Finistère, France. She was on a voyage from Antwerp, Belgium to Cardiff, Glamorgan.
Hereford	United Kingdom	The sloop collided with Mindora (United Kingdom) and sank at Cardiff.
Johann Catherina	Denmark	The ship departed from Riga, Russia for London, United Kingdom. No further trace, presumed foundered with the loss of all hands.
Mantilla Mignano	Italy	The brigantine arrived at Civita Vecchia on fire and was scuttled. Her crew were rescued. She was on a voyage from Marseille, Bouches-du-Rhône, France to Naples.
Mary Ann Melville	United Kingdom	The ship sank off Dunkirk, Nord, France. Her crew were rescued. She was on a voyage from Rouen, Seine-Inférieure, France to Rochester, Kent.
Nordcap	Norway	The barque was wrecked near Lysekil, Sweden. Her crew were rescued. She was on a voyage from Härnösand, Sweden to Bordeaux, Gironde, France.
Serica	United Kingdom	The ship was wrecked in the Paracel Islands with the loss of all but one of her 28 crew. She was on a voyage from Hong Kong to Montevideo, Uruguay.
South America	United States	The ship was abandoned off Le Tréport, Seine-Inférieure by sixteen of the nineteen people on board. She was on a voyage from London to Savannah, Georgia.

== 4 November ==
List of shipwrecks: 4 November 1872
Ship	State	Description
Angia	(United Kingdom of Great Britain and Ireland) Jersey	The barque was driven ashore and wrecked at Saint Sampson, Guernsey, Channel Islands. Her crew were rescued.
Azoff	Greece	The ship was sighted in the Dardanelles whilst on a voyage from Mangalia, Ottoman Empire to a British port. No further trace, presumed foundered with the loss of all hands.
Barbadoes	United Kingdom	The ship was sighted off Bic, Nova Scotia, Canada whilst on a voyage from Montreal, Quebec, Canada to the Clyde. No further trace, presumed foundered with the loss of all hands.
Christian August	Norway	The ship was abandoned in the North Sea. Her crew were rescued. She was on a voyage from "Norboden" to London, United Kingdom.
Commander	United Kingdom	The steamship departed from "Brill", on the Saint Lawrence River for a British port. No further trace, presumed foundered with the loss of all hands, about twenty lives.
Havre	France	The ship sprang a leak and put into Ramsgate, Kent, United Kingdom, where she sank. She was on a voyage from Boulogne, Pas-de-Calais, France to Swansea, Glamorgan, United Kingdom.
Isabella	United Kingdom	The full-rigged ship was wrecked at Cape St. Marie, Uruguay with the loss of all but one of her crew. She was on a voyage from Liverpool, Lancashire, United Kingdom to Buenos Aires, Argentina.
Jessie	United Kingdom	The ship sank off Egmond aan Zee, North Holland, Netherlands. Four crew survived. She was on a voyage from Seaham, County Durham to the Nieuwe Diep.
Lawton	United Kingdom	The ship was driven ashore at Lindesfarne, Northumberland. She was on a voyage from Sunderland, County Durham to Arbroath, Forfarshire.
Lily	United Kingdom	The ship was driven ashore at Winterton-on-Sea, Norfolk.
Princess of Wales	United Kingdom	The ship was driven ashore on South Ronaldshay, Orkney Islands. She was on a voyage from King's Lynn, Norfolk to Ayr. She was refloated.
Rudolph	Germany	The ship ran aground in the Cape Fear River. She was on a voyage from London to Wilmington, North Carolina, United States.
Sovereign	United Kingdom	The brig was abandoned off Skagen, Denmark. Her crew were rescued. She was on a voyage from Söderhamn, Sweden to Sutton Bridge, Lincolnshire.
Thelxinoe	Belgium	The ship was driven ashore at Le Touquet, Pas-de-Calais She was on a voyage from Antwerp to Cardiff, Glamorgan.

== 5 November ==
List of shipwrecks: 5 November 1872
Ship	State	Description
Belina	United Kingdom	The ship was driven ashore 1 nautical mile (1.9 km) north of the mouth of the River Don. She was on a voyage from Aberdeen to Sunderland, County Durham.
Cambrian	United Kingdom	The ship was wrecked on Grand Cayman, Cayman Islands. She was on a voyage from the Black River, Jamaica to London.
David	Germany	The ship was wrecked near Marstrand, Sweden. She was on a voyage from New York, United States to Helsingør, Denmark.
De Novo Nieber	Russia	The ship departed from Kronstadt for Helsingør. No further trace, presumed foundered in the Baltic Sea with the loss of all hands.
Emperor	United Kingdom	The brig was driven ashore at Aldeburgh, Suffolk. Her crew were rescued by rocket apparatus; her captain and mate remained aboard. She was on a voyage from South Shields, County Durham to London. She was refloated on 8 November and taken into Lowestoft, Suffolk.
Good Advice	United Kingdom	The ship was run down and sunk by a barque. Her crew were rescued by the barque and a Dutch fishing boat.
Hero	Norway	The ship was driven ashore on Svínoy, Faeroe Islands and sank. Her crew were rescued. She was on a voyage from Drammen to London.
Johan	United Kingdom	The ship was sighted off Bic, Nova Scotia, Canada whilst on a voyage from Quebec City, Canada to Hull, Yorkshire. No further trace, presumed foundered with the loss of all hands.
John Cock	United Kingdom	The ship was driven ashore at Saltfleet, Lincolnshire. She was on a voyage from Honfleur, Manche, France to Hull, Yorkshire. She was refloated.
King John	United Kingdom	The barque ran aground on the Signal Scar, in the Gulf of Bothnia. Her crew were rescued. She was on a voyage from a Swedish port to London.
Leonora	United Kingdom	The ship was driven ashore and wrecked at Schull, County Cork. Her crew survived. She was on a voyage from Wellington, New Zealand to Liverpool, Lancashire.
Mary Grace	United Kingdom	The ship ran aground on the Cross Sand, in the North Sea off the coast of Norfolk. She was on a voyage from Rochester, Kent to South Shields. She was refloated with the assistance of the Caistor Lifeboat and found to be severely leaky.
Paula	Germany	The ship was wrecked near Marstrand. She was on a voyage from Moulmein, Burma to Flensburg.

== 6 November ==
List of shipwrecks: 6 November 1872
Ship	State	Description
Aid	United Kingdom	The sloop was wrecked at the Ferry Toll Quarry, Fife. She was on a voyage from the Ferry Toll Quarry to Fisherrow, Lothian.
Belina	United Kingdom	The schooner was driven ashore at Murcar, Aberdeenshire. Her five crew survived. She was on a voyage from Aberdeen to Sunderland, County Durham.
Boston	United Kingdom	The ship foundered in the North Sea off Hartlepool, County Durham. Her crew were rescued. She was on a voyage from Middlesbrough, Yorkshire to Sunderland, County Durham.
Dart	(United Kingdom of Great Britain and Ireland) Isle of Man	The fishing lugger foundered 5 nautical miles (9.3 km) off the Calf of Man with the loss of all eight crew.
Dispatch	United Kingdom	The schooner was discovered derelict in the North Sea by Wellesley (United Kingdom). She was taken into the River Tyne.
Henry	United Kingdom	The schooner was driven onto the Pollock Rocks, in Douglas Bay. Her four crew survived. She was on a voyage from Wicklow to Whitehaven, Cumberland.
Lairton	United Kingdom	The sloop was driven ashore at Lindisfarne, Northumberland and severely damaged. She was on a voyage from Sunderland, County Durham to Arbroath, Forfarshire. She was refloated and taken into Lindishfarne.
Lothair	United Kingdom	The ship ran aground off Foulney Island, Lancashire.
Louise	United Kingdom	The ship was driven ashore in Loch Indaal. She was on a voyage from Port Dundas, Renfrewshire to Londonderry.
Mauritius	United Kingdom	The steamship foundered in the Irish Sea off Portpatrick, Wigtownshire with the loss of all 22 crew. She was on a voyage from Bordeaux, Gironde. France to Glasgow, Renfrewshire.
Nanny and Betty	United Kingdom	The Mersey Flat was run into and sunk by the barque Clifford (United Kingdom) at Barrow in Furness, Lancashire.
Ocean	United Kingdom	The ship was driven ashore and wrecked at Eyemouth, Berwickshire. She was on a voyage from Sunderland to Eyemouth.
Robert	United Kingdom	The brigantine was driven ashore and wrecked at Portnahaven, Islay, Inner Hebrides.
Veritas	United Kingdom	The barque was driven ashore on Foulney Island.
William and Mary	United Kingdom	The ship was driven ashore at Kettleness, Yorkshire. She was on a voyage from Sunderland to Rochester, Kent.

== 7 November ==
List of shipwrecks: 7 November 1872
Ship	State	Description
Argo	United Kingdom	The brig was abandoned in the North Sea 180 nautical miles (330 km) off Spurn Point, Yorkshire, United Kingdom. Her crew were rescued. She was on a voyage from a Swedish port to Ipswich, Suffolk.
Commandant Franchetti	France	The steamship caught fire on a voyage from Kronstadt, Russia to Dunkirk, Nord. She put back to Kronstadt.
Countryman	Norway	The brig was abandoned at sea. Her crew were rescued. She was on a voyage from Gävle, Sweden to an English port.
Electric	Germany	The ship was abandoned in the Atlantic Ocean in a sinking condition. All on board were rescued by Helmesbrand (Norway). Electric was on a voyage from New York, United States to Hamburg.
Hans	Germany	The ship was driven ashore near South Shields, County Durham, United Kingdom.
Laura	Norway	The ship was driven ashore and wrecked near Farsund with the loss of four of her crew. She was on a voyage from Peterhead, Aberdeenshire, United Kingdom to Drammen.
Leveret	United Kingdom	The ship was driven ashore in the Carlingford Lough.
Maggie P. S. Lord	Canada	The barque was destroyed by fire at Pictou, Nova Scotia.
Mediator	United Kingdom	The ship departed from Quebec City, Canada for London. No further trace, presumed foundered with the loss of all hands.
Mont Blanc	United Kingdom	The full-rigged ship was abandoned in the Atlantic Ocean. Her crew were rescued by Skjold (Norway). Mont Blanc was on a voyage from Miramichi, New Brunswick, Canada to Barrow-in-Furness, Lancashire.
Odin	Norway	The brig was driven ashore at Grangemouth, Stirlingshire, United Kingdom.
Quiver	United Kingdom	The schooner foundered off Skagen, Denmark. There were at least two survivors.
Sea King	Canada	The schooner was wrecked at Cape St. Mary's, Nova Scotia with the loss of all hands. She was on a voyage from New York to Hartlepool, County Durham, United Kingdom.
Sir Robert Preston	United Kingdom	The ship was driven ashore and wrecked at Lindisfarne, Northumberland. She was on a voyage from Leith, Lothian to Middlesbrough, Yorkshire.
Spey	United Kingdom	The brigantine was driven ashore at Cultra, County Down.
Unnamed	Flag unknown	The brig was abandoned in the North Sea with the loss of three of her twelve crew. Survivors were rescued by J. B. Rhodes (United Kingdom).

== 8 November ==
List of shipwrecks: 8 November 1872
Ship	State	Description
Ailsa	United Kingdom	The ship struck Fullerton's Rocks, off the Isle of Arran. She was on a voyage from Saint John's, Newfoundland Colony to Ayr. She was refloated and found to be severely leaky.
Albanian	United Kingdom	The steamship was driven ashore at the south point of Öland, Sweden. She was on a voyage from Newcastle upon Tyne, Northumberland to Kronstadt, Russia. She was refloated on 18 November.
Augusta	Germany	The ship was wrecked at "Stenberg", Denmark. Her crew were rescued. She was on a voyage from Newcastle upon Tyne to Kiel.
British Flag	United Kingdom	The ship departed from New York, United States for Liverpool, Lancashire. No further trace, presumed foundered with the loss of all hands.
Dagmar	Norway	The barque was abandoned in the Atlantic Ocean. Her crew were rescued by the steamship Idaho (United Kingdom). Dagmar was on a voyage from New York, United States to Queenstown, County Cork, United Kingdom.
Fidelity	United Kingdom	The schooner was driven ashore on Great Cumbrae. Her crew were rescued. She was on a voyage from Silloth, Cumberland to Londonderry.
Gravina	Spain	The steamship foundered in the Atlantic Ocean with the loss of all but one of her crew. She was on a voyage from Montreal, Quebec, Canada to Liverpool, Lancashire, United Kingdom.
Katie	United States	The steamboat struck a sunken wreck and sank in the Mississippi River upstream of Helena, Arkansas. All on board were rescued.
Libra	Denmark	The schooner was wrecked at Falkenburg, near Gothenburg, Sweden. Her crew were rescued.
Louise Christine	Denmark	The ship was driven ashore and wrecked near Ringkøbing. She was on a voyage from Newcastle upon Tyne to Ribe.
Martina	Italy	The ship was wrecked on the Lemon and Ower Sandbank, in the North Sea. Her crew were rescued by a Trinity House boat. She was on a voyage from Newcastle upon Tyne to Genoa.
Mary	United Kingdom	The schooner was wrecked on Sandford Point, Inverness-shire.
Oder	Norway	The brig was wrecked at Gothenburg.
Osiris	Germany	The ship was driven ashore at Gronhoj, Denmark. She was on a voyage from Malmö, Sweden to Papenburg.
Southern	United States	The steamship collided with the brig Æolus (United States) and sank. She was on a voyage from Quebec City, Canada to New York.
Sylph	United Kingdom	The ship foundered in the North Sea off Scarborough, Yorkshire. Her crew were rescued. She was on a voyage from Warkworth, Northumberland to Rotterdam, South Holland, Netherlands.
William	United Kingdom	The ship was wrecked at Hvaløerne, Norway. Her eight crew were rescued. She was on a voyage from Kronstadt to London.

== 9 November ==
List of shipwrecks: 9 November 1872
Ship	State	Description
Auguste	Germany	The ship was driven ashore at Montevideo, Uruguay.
Bee	United Kingdom	The ship was driven ashore and wrecked in the Kattegat. She was on a voyage from Stettin, Germany to Newport, Monmouthshire.
Carl	Sweden	The ship was wrecked near Strömstad. Her crew were rescued. She was on a voyage from "Wifsta Warf" to Honfleur, Manche, France.
Chebucto	United Kingdom	The ship was wrecked on the Mixen Sand, in the Bristol Channel. Her crew were rescued. She was on a voyage from Swansea, Glamorgan to Bilbao, Spain.
Cosmopolis	United Kingdom	The ship caught fire at Liverpool, Lancashire. She was on a voyage from Akyab, Burma to Liverpool.
Diamant	United Kingdom	The ship was driven ashore at Montevideo.
Elizabeth	France	The ship was wrecked near Lysekil, Sweden. She was on a voyage from Honfleur to Arendal, Norway.
Fata Morgana	Sweden	The ship was wrecked near Lysekil. She was on a voyage from Gothenburg to "Palmes".
Giovanni	Austria-Hungary	The barque caught fire at Büyükdere, Ottoman Empire and was scuttled. She was on a voyage from Hull, Yorkshire to Galaţi, Ottoman Empire.
Hariet Dobing	United Kingdom	The brig was wrecked near Marstrand, Sweden. Her crew were rescued. She was on a voyage from Kronstadt, Russia to London.
Hilma	Sweden	The ship was driven ashore near Lysekil. She was on a voyage from Gamla Carleby to Hull.
Legatus	United Kingdom	The ship was driven ashore and wrecked in the Kattegat. She was on a voyage from Gävle, Sweden to an English port.
Margarethe	Germany	The schooner was driven ashore near Lemvig, Norway. She was on a voyage from Brake to a Norwegian port.
Maria Christina	Sweden	The ship was wrecked near Marstrand. She was on a voyage from Burntisland, Fife, United Kingdom to "Sither".
Prince Albert	United Kingdom	The brig was wrecked at Rörö, Sweden. Her crew were rescued.
Queen's Own	United Kingdom	The ship was wrecked near Lysekil. Her twelve crew were rescued. She was on a voyage from London to Christiania.

== 10 November ==
List of shipwrecks: 10 November 1872
Ship	State	Description
Ankathor	Norway	The barque was abandoned in the Atlantic Ocean. Her crew were rescued by Rebus (United Kingdom). Ankathor was on a voyage from New York to a Channel port.
Brahan Castle	United Kingdom	The schooner was abandoned in the North Sea. She was on a voyage from Harburg, Germany to Sunderland, County Durham.
Don	(United Kingdom of Great Britain and Ireland) Jersey	The ship was abandoned off North Sunderland, County Durham. Her six crew were rescued by the North Sunderland Lifeboat. She was on a voyage from Saint-Malo, Ille-et-Vilaine, France to Leith, Lothian. Don was reboarded the next day. She was towed into Lindisfarne, Northumberland in a leaky condition on 13 November.
Ellen Owen	United Kingdom	The smack was driven ashore at Goodwick, Pembrokeshire. Her crew were rescued by the Goodwick Lifeboat Sir Edward Perrot ( Royal National Lifeboat Institution).
Herald	United Kingdom	The steamship collided with another vessel and foundered in the Baltic Sea with the loss of all but one of her eighteen. She was on a voyage from Hull, Yorkshire to Danzig, Germany.
John and Grace	United Kingdom	The ship was driven ashore and wrecked at Goodwick. Her crew were rescued by the Fishguard Lifeboat Sir Edward Perrot ( Royal National Lifeboat Institution).
John and Henry	United Kingdom	The ship was driven ashore and wrecked at Cape Cove, Newfoundland Colony with the loss of all seven of her crew.
Lion	United Kingdom	The smack was driven ashore and wrecked at Goodwick. Her crew were rescued by the Fishguard Lifeboat Sir Edward Perrot ( Royal National Lifeboat Institution)
Mary	United Kingdom	The smack was driven ashore and wrecked at Goodwick. Her crew were rescued by the Fishguard Lifeboat Sir Edward Perrot ( Royal National Lifeboat Institution)
Pyrenees	United Kingdom	The schooner was driven ashore and wrecked at Cardigan with the loss of all hands.
Queen Victoria	United Kingdom	The sloop was driven ashore at Grainthorpe, Lincolnshire. Both crew were rescued by the Cleethorpes Lifeboat Manchester Unity of Oddfellows ( Royal National Lifeboat Institution).
Skjalmhvide	Denmark	The ship was sighted off Fortress Monroe, Virginia, United States whilst on a voyage from Baltimore, Maryland, United States to Penarth, Glamorgan, United Kingdom. No further trace, presumed foundered with the loss of all hands.
Villager	United Kingdom	The ship was wrecked on the Rigg Rud, off Lindisfarne, Northumberland. Her crew were rescued. She was on a voyage from Sunderland to Lossiemouth, Moray.
Unnamed vessels	Flags unknown	Great Boston Fire of 1872: A number of ships were destroyed by fire at Boston, Massachusetts, United States.

== 11 November ==
List of shipwrecks: 11 November 1872
Ship	State	Description
Affinitas	Norway	The ship was driven ashore and wrecked at Fjällbacka, Sweden with the loss of a crew member. She was on a voyage from Charlestown, Cornwall, United Kingdom to Christiania.
Duke of Abercorn	United Kingdom	The schooner was driven ashore on the Wolves.
Ellen Clifford	United Kingdom	The ship departed from Huelva, Spain for Glasgow, Renfrewshire. No further trace, presumed foundered with the loss of all hands.
Ellen Owens	United Kingdom	The ship was driven ashore at Goodwick, Pembrokeshire.
Gem	United Kingdom	The ship was driven ashore at Pendennis, Cornwall. She was on a voyage from Rouen, Seine-Inférieure, France to Newport, Monmouthshire. She was refloated.
Heroine	United Kingdom	The ship ran aground on the Old Harry Ledge, in the English Channel off the coast of Dorset. She was refloated and towed into Poole, Dorset.
Humility	United Kingdom	The brig sank off Borth, Cardiganshire. Her crew were rescued. She was on a voyage from Poole, Dorset to Runcorn, Cheshire.
John and Grace	United Kingdom	The ship was driven ashore and wrecked at Goodwick.
Lake Constance	United Kingdom	The ship foundered off St. Paul Island, Nova Scotia, Canada. She was on a voyage from Montreal, Quebec, Canada to London.
Lata	Norway	The ship was driven ashore and wrecked at Fjällbacka. She was on a voyage from Haugesund to Stockholm, Sweden.
Leon	United Kingdom	The ship was driven ashore at Goodwick.
Lindisfarne	United Kingdom	The ship ran aground in the River Foyle. She was on a voyage from Nicolaieff, Russia to Falmouth, Cornwall.
Livonia	United Kingdom	The ship departed from Pärnu, Russia for Belfast, County Antrim. No further trace, presumed foundered with the loss of all hands.
Mary James	United Kingdom	The ship was driven ashore and wrecked at Goodwick.
Michael	United Kingdom	The ship was driven ashore and wrecked at Fjällbacka. She was on a voyage from Stettin, Germany to Gloucester.
Ocean	United Kingdom	The brig was wrecked on a reef off Lysekil, Sweden with the loss of five of her nine crew. She was on a voyage from Helsingborg, Sweden to London.
Palestine	United Kingdom	The brig was wrecked on the Ramsdale Scar, off Scarborough, Yorkshire. Her crew were rescued by the Scarborough Lifeboat Lady Leigh ( Royal National Lifeboat Institution). Palestine was on a voyage from Hartlepool, County Durham to London.
Pyrenees	United Kingdom	The schooner was driven ashore and wrecked at Cardigan with the loss of all three of her crew.
Unnamed	United States	The ship was wrecked on a reef off Lysekil with the loss of all hands.

== 12 November ==
List of shipwrecks: 12 November 1872
Ship	State	Description
Albion	Germany	The ship was driven ashore near Strömstad, Sweden. Her crew were rescued.
Alexandra	Norway	The ship was wrecked near Strömstad with the loss of five of her crew. She was on a voyage from Rotterdam, South Holland, Netherlands to Kragerø.
Astrea	Norway	The ship ran aground at Kristiansand.
Bato	Russia	The ship was lost whilst on a voyage from Riga to Antwerp, Belgium.
British Trident	United Kingdom	The ship departed from Quebec City, Canada for Port Glasgow, Renfrewshire. No further trace, presumed foundered with the loss of all hands.
Borgund	(Russian Empire) Grand Duchy of Finland	The barque was wrecked at "Østergaard", Sweden. Her crew were rescued. She was on a voyage from Tornio to London, United Kingdom
Cupid	United Kingdom	The smack was driven ashore at Saltfleet, Lincolnshire. Her crew were rescued.
Curlew	United Kingdom	The ship collided with a Norwegian vessel and foundered. Her six crew survived. She was on a voyage from Sundsvall, Sweden to Newcastle upon Tyne, Northumberland.
Eliza Fraser	United Kingdom	The ship ran aground on the Smithie Sand, in the North Sea. She was on a voyage from Rouen, Seine-Inférieure, France to Leith, Lothian. She was refloated and taken into Bridlington, Yorkshire in a leaky condition.
F. G. Arnold	Germany	The ship was wrecked on the Westergrund, in the Baltic Sea off Swinemünde. Her crew were rescued.
Flying Childers	United Kingdom	The paddle tug heeled over and sank at Belfast, County Antrim. She was refloated the next day with the assistance of two scows and was beached pending repairs.
Fred	Norway	The ship ran aground at Brekkestø.
Isaber	Flag unknown	The ship was wrecked at Montevideo, Uruguay.
Kaswu	Russia	The barque was wrecked on Saaremaa with the loss of all but two of those on board. She was on a voyage from Sunderland, County Durham, United Kingdom to Riga.
Kron Prins Ocar	Norway	The ship was wrecked near Strömstad with the loss of three of her crew. She was on a voyage from London to Fredrikshald.
Laura	Norway	The brig was driven ashore and wrecked on Heligoland. Her crew were rescued. she was on a voyage from Sundsvall, Sweden to Dordrecht, South Holland, Netherlands.
Margarete	Sweden	The ship was sighted off Helsingør, Denmark whilst on a voyage from Gävle to Hull, Yorkshire. No further trace, presumed foundered with the loss of all hands.
Margarethe Bankier	Germany	The ship was wrecked on the Westergrund. Her crew were rescued.
Thetis	Germany	The ship was wrecked on the Westergrund.

== 13 November ==
List of shipwrecks: 13 November 1872
Ship	State	Description
Alfred	Germany	The ship was wrecked at Gedser, Denmark. Her crew were rescued.
Amaranth	United Kingdom	The ship was wrecked at Køge, Denmark. Her nine crew survived.
Ane Kjerstine	Denmark	The yacht was driven ashore at "Korvig". Her crew were rescued.
Bravo	United Kingdom	The ship was driven ashore at Grimsby, Lincolnshire. Her crew were rescued.
Catherine	United Kingdom	The ship capsized in the River Bandon.
Christian	Denmark	The ship sank at Præstø.
Ernestine	United Kingdom	The ship was wrecked on Anholt, Denmark. She was on a voyage from Runcorn, Cheshire to Stettin, Germany.
Hertha	Germany	The steamship was run into by a British schooner at Stralsund and sank.
Hiawatha	United Kingdom	The barque was wrecked on the Goodwin Sands, Kent with the loss of all but one of her fifteen crew. The survivor was rescued by SMS Hertha (Imperial German Navy). Hiawatha was on a voyage from Bremerhaven, Germany to Falmouth, Cornwall.
Industrie	Sweden	The ship was wrecked on Fehmarn, Germany. She was on a voyage from Ljusne to Dover, Kent.
Isabella	United Kingdom	The schooner foundered in the North Sea. Her crew were rescued.
Leon	France	The ship was driven ashore at Saint-Valery-sur-Somme, Somme with the loss of two of her crew.
Lollard	United Kingdom	The ship sailed on this date, no further trace, presumed foundered with the loss of all hands.
Maria	United Kingdom	The ship was driven ashore and wrecked at Spurn Point, Yorkshire. She was on a voyage from Lyme Regis, Dorset to Sunderland, County Durham. She was refloated.
Mary Kellow	United Kingdom	The ship ran aground at Poole, Dorset.
Medora	Norway	The ship was wrecked on Bornholm, Denmark with some loss of life. She was on a voyage from Sundsvall, Sweden to Dartmouth, Devon, United Kingdom.
Shannon	United Kingdom	The steamship was sighted off Cape Breton Island, Nova Scotia, Canada whilst on a voyage from Montreal, Quebec, Canada to a British port. No further trace, presumed foundered with the loss of all 27 crew.
Sorruto	Norway	The ship was abandoned off Møn, Denmark by nine of her eleven crew, who were rescued by Indefatigable (United Kingdom). She was on a voyage from Gävle, Sweden to London, United Kingdom.
St. Mary	United States	The steamboat struck a snag and sank in the Mississippi River downstream of Cairo, Illinois. All on board were rescued. She was on a voyage from Memphis, Tennessee to Cincinnati, Ohio.
Victoria	United Kingdom	The ship ran aground at Exmouth, Devon. She was on a voyage from South Shields, County Durham to Exmouth. She was refloated and found to be leaky.
Wellington	United Kingdom	The brig was driven ashore and wrecked at Seaton Delaval, County Durham. Her crew were rescued. She was on a voyage from Hamburg, Germany to Middlesbrough, Yorkshire.
Eighty unnamed vessels	Germany	The fishing smacks sank at Stralsund.

== 14 November ==
List of shipwrecks: 14 November 1872
Ship	State	Description
Adolph	Germany	The ship was wrecked in Køge Bay. Her crew were rescued. She was on a voyage from Philadelphia, Pennsylvania to Swinemünde.
Albatross	United Kingdom	The ship was driven ashore on the east coast of Öland, Sweden. She was on a voyage from Kronstadt, Russia to Newcastle upon Tyne, Northumberland.
Alexander	United Kingdom	The ship was driven ashore at Copenhagen, Denmark. She was on a voyage from Saint Petersburg, Russia to a Scottish port.
Alexandrine	France	The schooner was driven ashore at "Briggirdle", Norfolk, United Kingdom. She was on a voyage from Caen, Calvados to Leith, Lothian, United Kingdom.
Alma	Norway	The brig was driven ashore and wrecked at Stege, Denmark. Her crew were rescued. She was on a voyage from Härnösand, Sweden to Oran, Algeria.
Anna	Sweden	The ship was driven ashore at Copenhagen. She was refloated on 16 November.
Anna	Germany	The brig was driven ashore and wrecked at Stege.
Arauna	Flag unknown	The ship was driven ashore at Copenhagen. She was on a voyage from "Skonkvik" to Alloc, Clackmannanshire, United Kingdom.
Australië	Netherlands	The ship ran aground on the Shipwash Sand, in the North Sea off the coast of Essex, United Kingdom and was abandoned. Her captain survived, the rest of her crew were reported missing. She was later refloated and towed into London, United Kingdom in a waterlogged condition.
Carolina	United Kingdom	The steamship was abandoned in the Atlantic Ocean (44°00′N 53°20′W) with some loss of life. Survivors were rescued by the barque Magnus Lagaboter (Norway). Carolina was on a voyage from Baltimore, Maryland, United States to Queenstown, County Cork.
Ceres	Belgium	The ship was driven ashore at Copenhagen. She was on a voyage from Haparanda, Grand Duchy of Finland to Antwerp.
City of Newcastle	New Zealand	The 538-ton barque was en route from Wellington to Newcastle, New South Wales and took shelterin Cloudy Bay from a heavy storm raging in Cook Strait. In a thick mist, she drifted close into the cliff-faced shore and became wedged between two rocks. Most of the 14 crew and nine passengers took to the ship's two boats, from which they were rescued by the schooner Canterbury and barque John Knox. Six men remained on board, of whom two drowned (one passenger and the ship's cook). The four survivors were rescued by the steamer Rangatira (New Zealand).
Criteria	(Dominion of Newfoundland) Newfoundland Colony	The schooner departed from Figueira da Foz, Portugal for Saint John's. No further trace, presumed foundered with the loss of all hands.
Danube	United Kingdom	The ship ran aground in the River Nene. She was on a voyage from Söderhamn, Sweden to Wisbech, Cambridgeshire. She was refloated and towed into Wisbech in a leaky condition.
Devon	United Kingdom	The steamship departed from Sydney, Nova Scotia, Canada for a British port. No further trace, presumed foundered with the loss of all.
Dina Adrianna	Netherlands	The ship was run into by the barque Sarah Metcalfe (United Kingdom) and was driven ashore at Corton, Suffolk, United Kingdom.
Dritti Julli	Germany	The ship was driven ashore near Groß Niendorf. She was on a voyage from London to Kolberg.
Eclipse	United Kingdom	The barque was driven ashore and wrecked at Stege. Her crew were rescued. She was on a voyage from "Siekauw" to Great Yarmouth, Norfolk.
E. J. D.	France	The brig was driven ashore at Scarborough, Yorkshire, United Kingdom. Her eight crew were rescued by the Scarborough Lifeboat. She broke up on 22 November.
Elieser	Norway	The brig was driven ashore and wrecked at Stege. She was on a voyage from Gävle, Sweden to Tønsberg.
Elise Louis Desirée	France	The ship struck a sunken wreck and foundered in the North Sea. Her crew were rescued. She was on a voyage from Dordrecht, South Holland, Netherland to Caen.
Equator	United Kingdom	The brig ran aground at Dragør, Denmark.
Evening Star	Flag unknown	The brig was driven ashore and wrecked at Stege. Her crew were rescued.
Expedit	Sweden	The ship was wrecked on the Goodwin Sands, Kent, United Kingdom. Her nine crew were rescued by the Lowestoft Lifeboat Letitia ( Royal National Lifeboat Institution). Expedit was on a voyage from Gothenburg to London.
Factor	United Kingdom	The schooner was driven ashore at Lowestoft, Suffolk. Her crew were rescued. She was on a voyage from London to Goole, Yorkshire.
Frederick Staug	Norway	The ship was driven ashore at Happisburgh, Norfolk, United Kingdom. Her crew were rescued. She was on a voyage from Norway to Lisbon, Portugal.
George Edward	United Kingdom	The ship was wrecked at "Kroge".
Giulia	Italy	The full-rigged ship foundered in Audierne Bay. She was on a voyage from London to New York, United States.
Haabet	Denmark	The schooner foundered in the Dogger Bank. Her crew were rescued. She was on a voyage from Newcastle upon Tyne, Northumberland, United Kingdom to Apenrade.
Hertha	Sweden	The ship was wrecked in Køge Bay. She was on a voyage from Sundsvall to Boulogne, Pas-de-Calais, France.
Ida	United Kingdom	The ship was driven ashore at Copenhagen. She was on a voyage from Trelleborg, Sweden to Hull, Yorkshire. She was refloated on 16 November.
Industry	United Kingdom	The ship was driven ashore at Copenhagen. She was later refloated.
Johann Smith	United Kingdom	The ship was driven ashore at Copenhagen. She was on a voyage from "Norbolton" to London.
Jonas Gabriel	Sweden	The ship was wrecked at Copenhagen. She was on a voyage from Sundsvall to London.
Kjoge	Denmark	The ship sank at Præstø. She was on a voyage from Christiania, Norway to London.
Kuopio	Flag unknown	The ship was driven ashore at Copenhagen. She was on a voyage from an English port to Königsberg, Germany.
Lizzy	United Kingdom	The brig was driven ashore in Køge Bay.
Marguerite	France	The brig ran aground on the Kentish Knock. She was refloated with the assistance of the Ramsgate Lifeboat Bradford ( Royal National Lifeboat Institution), the tug Aid and a lugger (both United Kingdom) and assisted into Margate, Kent in a waterlogged condition.
Minnet	Flag unknown	The ship was driven ashore and wrecked at Stege.
New York	Norway	The barque was wrecked at Stege with the loss of a crew member. She was on a voyage from Kalix, Sweden to Tunis, Beylik of Tunis.
Pollux	Norway	The brig was driven ashore and wrecked at Stege. She was on a voyage from Sundsvall to Dundee, Forfarshire, United Kingdom.
Protector	United Kingdom	The ship was driven ashore at Copenhagen.
Retreiver	United Kingdom	The ship was wrecked near Møn, Denmark. Her seven crew were rescued. She was on a voyage from Sundsvall, Sweden to Hartlepool, County Durham.
Sarah Metcalfe	United Kingdom	The barque was driven ashore at Gorleston, Suffolk. Her crew were rescued by the Gorleston Lifeboat. She was on a voyage from Quebec City, Canada to Grangemouth, Stirlingshire.
Schonderloo	Norway	The barque was driven ashore and wrecked at Stege. Her crew were rescued. She was on a voyage from Nyland, Sweden to Algiers, Algeria.
Sergey	Sweden	The ship was driven ashore at Præstø. She was on a voyage from Hudiksvall to Grangemouth.
Southern Belle	Canada	The barque was driven ashore and wrecked at Stege. Her cew were rescued. She was on a voyage from Sundsvall to Bristol, Gloucestershire, United Kingdom. She was later refloated and taken into Copenhagen, Denmark, where she arrived on 27 December.
To Venner	Norway	The barque was driven ashore and wrecked at Stege. Her crew were rescued. She was on a voyage from Gävle to Dublin, United Kingdom.
Trois Freres	Sweden	The ship sank off Christiansoe, Germany.
Wilhelmine	(Russian Empire) Grand Duchy of Finland	The ship was driven ashore at Præstø. She was on a voyage from Pori to West Hartlepool, County Durham.
Wupke Veltman	Flag unknown	The galiot was abandoned 60 nautical miles (110 km) off Lowestoft with the loss of two of her five crew.
Fourteen unnamed vessels	Flags unknown	The ships were wrecked at Copenhagen.
Unnamed	Germany	The yacht was driven from the Ryck and deposited in the street in Griefswald.
Unnamed	Flag unknown	The ship was driven ashore and wrecked at Swinemünde, Germany with the loss of all fourteen crew.

== 15 November ==
List of shipwrecks: 15 November 1872
Ship	State	Description
Accommodation	United Kingdom	The Yorkshire Billyboy was driven ashore at Graveline, Nord, France. She was on a voyage from Calais, France to Boston, Lincolnshire.
Alexandrine	Russia	The schooner ran aground in the Haff, off Pillau, Germany.
Alma	United Kingdom	The steamship was driven ashore on Koserow, Germany.
Archipelago	United Kingdom	The ship collided with another vessel and was beached in the River Thames at Northfleet, Kent. She was on a voyage from Skutskär, Sweden to London.
Barbarossa	United Kingdom	The barque ran aground on the Maplin Sand, in the North Sea off the coast of Essex and broke her back.
Essex	Germany	The steam lighter ran aground off Elbing and was wrecked.
Eucharis	United Kingdom	The ship ran aground on the Swin Middle Sand, in the Thames Estuary. She was on a voyage from Christiania, Norway to London. She was refloated.
Henriette	Norway	The ship was driven ashore on "Abw Tiller". She was on a voyage from Sundsvall, Sweden to London.
Hermann	Germany	The ship was assisted into Ystad, Sweden in a sinking condition. She was on a voyage from Newcastle upon Tyne, Northumberland, United Kingdom to Stockholm, Sweden.
Lizzie and Ada	United Kingdom	The ship was driven ashore at Blakeney, Norfolk. Her crew were rescued. She was on a voyage from Vlissingen, Zeeland to Sunderland, County Durham. She was refloated on 29 November.
Lutha	United Kingdom	The schooner was driven ashore at Thornham, Norfolk. She was on a voyage from Casablanca, Morocco to Goole, Yorkshire.
Marblehead	United States	The ship departed from Galveston, Texas for Liverpool, Lancashire, United Kingdom. Presumed subsequently foundered in the Atlantic Ocean with the loss of all hands. A ship thought to be Marblehead was sighted in a capsized condition on 15 February 1873 by the barque Athlete (United Kingdom).
Margaret Jane	United Kingdom	The ship was driven ashore at Rudbjerg, Denmark. Her crew were rescued. She was on a voyage from Gävle, Sweden to London.
Mary	Norway	The schooner was abandoned in the Batteny Gat. Her crew were rescued by the smack Thrive (United Kingdom). Mary was on a voyage from Fredrikstad to Poole, Dorset, United Kingdom.
Meggie	United Kingdom	The barque was abandoned in the Atlantic Ocean. Her crew were rescued by the barque Maria (Austria-Hungary). Meggie was on a voyage from Quebec City, Canada to Grimsby, Lincolnshire.
Memel Packet	United Kingdom	The steamship was driven ashore on Koserow.
Norfolk	United Kingdom	The steamship ran aground at "Stubben", Denmark. She was refloated.
Sesostris	Norway	The ship was wreckeed on Smith's Knowl, in the North Sea off the coast of Norfolk with the loss of all but one of her fifteen crew. The survivor was rescued by the steamship Leeds (United Kingdom). Sesostris was on a voyage from Porsgrun to London.
Sylphiden	United Kingdom	The ship was driven ashore at Holkham, Norfolk.
Triton	Norway	The barque was wrecked on the Corton Sand, in the North Sea off the coast of Suffolk, United Kingdom. Her crew survived. She wasd on a voyage from Kronstadt, Russia to London, United Kingdom.
Two unnamed vessels	Flags unknown	The ships were driven ashore on Koserow.

== 16 November ==
List of shipwrecks: 16 November 1872
Ship	State	Description
Atlas	United Kingdom	The ship was wrecked at Stevns Klint, Denmark. She was on a voyage from Sundsvall, Sweden to London.
Cadzandria	Russia	The galiot was driven ashore and wrecked at the Orfordness Lighthouse, Suffolk, United Kingdom. Her crew were rescued by rocket apparatus. She was on a voyage from Saint Petersburg to Rochester, Kent, United Kingdom.
Christian	United Kingdom	The ship sank at Præstø, Denmark.
Clarissa	Sweden	The brig was driven ashore and wrecked at Goswick, Northumberland, United Kingdom. Her ten crew survived; five were rescued by rocket apparatus. She was on a voyage from Uddevalla to Grangemouth, Stirlingshire, United Kingdom.
Enfans Nantais	France	The barque was wrecked at "Ulloa", British Honduras.
Himalaya	United Kingdom	The ship was wrecked at Stevns Klint.
Kjoge	Norway	The ship sank at Præstø, Denmark. She was on a voyage from Christiania to an English port.
Lulloe	Germany	The ship sank in the Baltic Sea. Her crew were rescued.
Maartje Dornbos	Netherlands	The ship was abandoned in the North Sea 160 nautical miles (300 km) off Spurn Point, Yorkshire, United Kingdom. Her crew were rescued. She was on a voyage from Riga, Russia to Delfzijl, Groningen. Maartje Dornbos was towed into Hull, Yorkshire by two smacks.
Malta	United Kingdom	The steamship was abandoned in a sinking condition. Her crew were rescued by the steamship Fenham (United Kingdom). Malta was on a voyage from Kronstadt, Russia to London.
Marie	United Kingdom	The ship was wrecked at Køge, Denmark. Her crew were rescued. She was on a voyage from Danzig, Germany to Newcastle upon Tyne, Northumberland.
Memphis	Unflagged	The steamship collided with the quayside on being launched at Hartlepool, County Durham, United Kingdom and was damaged at the stern.
Quiver	United Kingdom	The schooner was wrecked at Lysekil, Sweden. Her crew were rescued. She was on a voyage from Stettin, Germany to Fraserburgh, Aberdeenshire.
Raja and Emily	United Kingdom	The ship was driven ashore and wrecked at Aldeburgh, Suffolk with the loss of a crew member. She was on a voyage from Memel, Germany to London.
Silphiden	Norway	The schooner was driven ashore at Holkham, Norfolk, United Kingdom.
Susannah	United Kingdom	The smack collided with the steamship Algeria (United Kingdom) and sank in the Sloyne. She was on a voyage from Runcorn, Cheshire to Barrow-in-Furness, Lancashire.
Vale of Nith	United Kingdom	The barque ran aground on the Burbo Bank, in Liverpool Bay. Her crew were rescued by the New Brighton Lifeboat. She was on a voyage from Liverpool, Lancashire to Valparaíso, Chile. She was refloated with assistance from the tugs Knight Errant and Retreiver (both United Kingdom) and towed back to Liverpool.
Vesta	Sweden	The brig was wrecked on the Gunfleet Sand, in the North Sea off the coast of Essex, United Kingdom. Her eight crew were rescued by the steamship Biddick (United Kingdom). Vesta was on a voyage from Söderhamn to Lisbon, Portugal. She was refloated and towed into Harwich, Essex in a waterlogged condition.
Unnamed	United Kingdom	The Mersey Flat sanky off Rock Ferry, Cheshire.

== 17 November ==
List of shipwrecks: 17 November 1872
Ship	State	Description
Aerve	Sweden	The ship foundered. Her crew were rescued by Arnon (Flag unknown). Aerve was on a voyage from Hartlepool, County Durham, United Kingdom to Gävle.
Elise	Germany	The ship was driven ashore near Eckernförde. She was on a voyage from Leith, Lothian to Kiel.
E. S. Judkins	United Kingdom	The ship was sighted off Gibraltar whilst on a voyage from Sulina, Ottoman Empire to Falmouth, Cornwall. No further trace, presumed foundered with the loss of all hands.
Espoir	Belgium	The ship was wrecked on Læsø, Denmark with the loss of three of her crew. She was on a voyage from Riga, Russia to Ghent, East Flanders.
Herbert	United Kingdom	The ship was driven ashore near Kerteminde, Denmark.
Leopold	Germany	The ship ran aground on the Gjedser Sand, in the Baltic Sea. She was on a voyage from Memel to Cardiff, Glamorgan, United Kingdom. She was refloated and taken into Kiel.
Saxon	United Kingdom	The steamship was wrecked on the Île de Groix, Morbihan, France. Her fourteen crew survived. She was on her maiden voyage, from the Clyde to Belle Île, Morbihan and/or Nantes, Loire-Inférieure, France.
Washington	Norway	The brig was abandoned in the North Sea. Her crew were rescued. She was towed into Grimsby, Lincolnshire, United Kingdom the next day.

== 18 November ==
List of shipwrecks: 18 November 1872
Ship	State	Description
Annechina Elsina	Netherlands	The ship was driven ashore on Öland, Sweden. She was on a voyage from Saint Petersburg, Russian Empire to Amsterdam, North Holland.
Baind Marid	Netherlands	The smack was wrecked on the Cross Sand, in the North Sea off the coast of Norfolk, United Kingdom.
Brunette	United Kingdom	The ship was driven ashore near Køge, Denmark. Her six crew survived.
Ceres	United Kingdom	The barque was driven ashore at Sfântu Gheorghe, Ottoman Empire. She was on a voyage from Sunderland, County Durham to Odesa, Russia. She was refloated the next day.
Infanta	Norway	The ship ran aground on the Swin Middle Sand, in the Thames Estuary. She was on a voyage from Drammen to London, United Kingdom. She was refloated and towed into London in a waterlogged condition.
Maggie Woodburn	United Kingdom	The schooner foundered off Skomer, Pembrokeshire with the loss of all hands. She was on a voyage from Briton Ferry, Glamorgan to Whitehaven, Cumberland.
Maria Carolina	Sweden	The ship was driven ashore on Öland. She was on a voyage from Härnösand to Faaborg, Denmark.
Nelly	United Kingdom	The smack was abandoned off Worms Head, Glamorgan. Her crew survived. SHe was on avoyage from Llanelly, Glamorgan to Bristol, Gloucestershire.
Nieuwe Schans	Netherlands	The schooner foundered in the North Sea 150 nautical miles (280 km) east of the Isle of May, United Kingdom. Her crew were rescued by Harold Haarfanger (Flag unknown). Nieuwe Schans was on a voyage from Peterhead, Aberdeenshire, United Kingdom to Königsberg, Germany.
Norma	Belgium	The barque was abandoned in the North Sea. Her crew were rescued. She was on a voyage from Sunderland, County Durham to London, United Kingdom. Norma was subsequently taken into Grimsby, Lincolnshire, United Kingdom by a number of smacks.
Oriental	United Kingdom	The barque was driven ashore and wrecked at Sunderland. She was on a voyage from Hamburg, Germany to Sunderland.
Patria	Russia	The barque was driven ashore at Portici, Italy. She was on a voyage from Swansea, Glamorgan to Odesa.
Pelikaan	Netherlands	The capsized and sank off Gotland, Sweden with the loss of all hands.
Princess	United Kingdom	The ship was driven ashore and wrecked near Kjøge. Her eight crew survived.
Samuel	United Kingdom	The ship was driven ashore near Kjøge. At least one crew member survived.
St. Lawrence	United Kingdom	The ship was driven ashore near Kjøge.
Storm	United Kingdom	The ship was driven ashore near Kjøge.
Taptee	India	The steamship struck a sunken rock at Vingoria and sank. All on board were rescued. She was on a voyage from Calcutta to Goa.

== 19 November ==
List of shipwrecks: 19 November 1872
Ship	State	Description
Azoff	United Kingdom	The ship was wrecked on the east coast of Zealand, Denmark. Her crew were rescued.
Blanche	United Kingdom	The barque ran aground off Gibraltar. She was on a voyage from New York, United States to Trieste. She was refloated and assisted into Gibraltar in a leaky condition.
Blossom	United Kingdom	The ship wsprang a leak and was beached at Fort William, Inverness-shire. She was on a voyage from Ballachulish to Inverness.
Ceres	United Kingdom	The schooner foundered in the Belfast Lough with the loss of all six crew. She was being towed from Belfast, County Antrim to Troon, Ayrshire.
Charles Ward	United Kingdom	The barque was abandoned in the Atlantic Ocean (49°16′N 41°27′W) with the loss of eleven of her twenty crew. Survivors were rescued by Batavia (United Kingdom). Charles Ward was on a voyage from Quebec City, Canada to a Scottish port.
Frenchman	United Kingdom	The ship was abandoned in the Atlantic Ocean. Her crew were rescued by the steamship Darien (United States). Frenchman was on a voyage from Quebec City, Canada to Greenock, Renfrewshire.
Jeune Alphonsine	France	The ship was wrecked near "Minizan". Her crew were rescued.
Johanna Maria	Netherlands	The ship was wrecked at Køge, Denmark with the loss of two of her crew. She was on a voyage from Stockholm, Sweden to an English port.
Nell	United Kingdom	The smack sprang a leak and foundered 2 nautical miles (3.7 km) off Aberystwyth, Cardiganshire. She was on a voyage from Aberystwyth to Bristol, Gloucestershire.
Patriot	Norway	The schooner was driven ashore at Aberdeen, United Kingdom. She was on a voyage from Drammen to Aberdeen. She was refloated and taken into Aberdeen.
Liverpool	United Kingdom	The barque was wrecked. Her crew were rescued.
Scotia	United Kingdom	The schooner was wrecked on Borkum, Germany. Her crew were rescued. She was on a voyage from the east coast of Scotland to Harlingen, Friesland, Netherlands.

== 20 November ==
List of shipwrecks: 20 November 1872
Ship	State	Description
Adelaide Ray	United Kingdom	The schooner was driven ashore at Newbiggin-by-the-Sea, Northumberland. Her crew were rescued. She was on a voyage from Portsmouth, Hampshire to Sunderland, County Durham.
Albatros	United Kingdom	The ship departed from Par, Cornwall for Ferrybridge, Yorkshire. No further trace, presumed foundered with the loss of all hands.
Assyria	United Kingdom	The ship was abandoned in the Atlantic Ocean. Her crew were rescued by the steamship Baltic (United Kingdom. Assyria was on a voyage from Quebec City, Canada to Plymouth, Devon.
Aukathor	Norway	The barque was abandoned in the Atlantic Ocean. Her crew were rescued by Rebus (United Kingdom). Aukathor was on a voyage from New York, United States to Falmouth, Cornwall, United Kingdom.
Chillingham Castle	United Kingdom	The steamship departed from the River Tyne for Malta. No further trace, presumed foundered with the loss of all hands.
Coral Queen	United Kingdom	The ship was driven ashore and wrecked at Nidingen, Sweden. Her crew were rescued.
David Cannon	United Kingdom	The brigantine was abandoned in the Atlantic Ocean. Her crew were rescued. She was on a voyage from Miramichi, New Brunswick, Canada to Liverpool, Lancashire.
Hokitika	Victoria	The ship struck the Rumbler Rock, off Cape Leeuwin, Western Australia and was wrecked. She was on a voyage from Melbourne to Mauritius.
Levgant	United Kingdom	The steamship sprang a leak and was beached at Portland, Dorset. She was on a voyage from Liverpool to Antwerp, Belgium.
Louisa	United Kingdom	The ship ran aground on the West Bank, in the Solent. She was on a voyage from Cardiff, Glamorgan to Portsmouth. She was refloated and resumed her voyage.
Marcus	United Kingdom	The steamship foundered in the Bay of Biscay. Her crew were rescued by Euphrosyne (United Kingdom). Marcus was on a voyage from Brăila, Ottoman Empire to Falmouth.
Marlborough	United Kingdom	The lighter was sunk at Chatham Dockyard, Kent when a 35-ton gun was dropped whilst being unloaded and penetrated her bottom. All on board survived. She was raised on 27 November and placed under repair.
Odin	Norway	The ship ran aground at "Faxoe", Denmark. She was refloated and taken into Helsingør in a leaky condition.
Pilot	United Kingdom	The brig collided with Hecamede (United Kingdom) and sank in the English Channel off the coast of Devon. Her crew were rescued. She was on a voyage from Cherbourg, Cherbourg, Manche, France to Briton Ferry, Glamorgan.
Scotia	United Kingdom	The ship was wrecked on Rottum, Groningen, Netherlands. She was on a voyage from Peterhead, Aberdeenshire to Harburg, Germany.
Teaser	United Kingdom	The barque was driven ashore near Køge, Denmark. She was on a voyage from Kronstadt, Russia to Copenhagen, Denmark.
Urbine	United Kingdom	The steamship ran aground at Hull, Yorkshire. She was on a voyage from Hull to Alexandria, Egypt.

== 21 November ==
List of shipwrecks: 21 November 1872
Ship	State	Description
Argueiles, and Owen Wallis	Spain; United Kingdom	The steamships collided off Europa Point, Gibraltar. Argueiles sank. Owen Wallis was beached at Gibraltar in a waterlogged condition.
Cyrene	United Kingdom	The barque was driven ashore and wrecked at Rattray Head, Aberdeenshire. She was on a voyage from Sunderland, County Durham to the West Indies.
Duo	Sweden	The schooner collided with a Norwegian brig and sank off Dragør, Denmark. Her crew were rescued. She was on a voyage from Gävle to Hull, Yorkshire, United Kingdom.
Edward Hawkins	United Kingdom	The ship was run ashore at Hamra, Gotland, Sweden.
Eliza Reed	United Kingdom	The schooner collided with the steamship Barton (United Kingdom) and sank off Valentia Island, County Cork. Her crew were rescued by Barton.
George and Mary	United Kingdom	The ship was run into by the steamship Emily (United Kingdom) and sank in the Humber. She was on a voyage from London to Goole, Yorkshire.
Henry Gilbert	United Kingdom	The ship was driven ashore at Garlieston, Wigtownshire.
John and Mary	United Kingdom	The schooner was run into by the steamship Emily (United Kingdom) and sank at Hull. Her crew were rescued.
Maciota	United Kingdom	The ship ran aground on the Pennington Spit, off the coast of Hampshire. Shew as on a voyage from Caen, Calvados, France to Liverpool, Lancashire.
Margaret Maria	France	The ship was run down by a steamship and sank in the River Thames at Grays Thurrock, Essex, United Kingdom.
Merlin	France	The ship was run into by a steamship at London, United Kingdom and was beached.

== 22 November ==
List of shipwrecks: 22 November 1872
Ship	State	Description
Creswell	United Kingdom	The steamship departed from Falmouth, Cornwall for Cork. No further trace, presumed foundered with the loss of all hands.
Dee	United Kingdom	The schooner foundered off the Copeland Islands, County Antrim. Her three crew were rescued by the steamship Sanda (United Kingdom). Dee was on a voyage from Wicklow to Liverpool.
Fanny Nicholson	United Kingdom	The barque foundered near Albany, Western Australia.
Leith	United Kingdom	The steamship was driven ashore and wrecked at Carnoustie, Forfarshire. Her crew were rescued by rocket apparatus. She was on a voyage from Blyth, Northumberland to Arbroath, Forfarshire.
Levanter	United Kingdom	The barque was abandoned at sea. She was on a voyage from Middlesbrough, Yorkshire to Havana, Cuba.
Père Lalande	France	The ship foundered 15 nautical miles (28 km) off the Île de Groix, Morbihan. Her crew were rescued. She was on a voyage from Saint-Nazaire, Ille-et-Vilaine to the Clyde.
Two unnamed vessels	United Kingdom	The sloops sank off Plymouth, Devon. Their crews were rescued.

== 23 November ==
List of shipwrecks: 23 November 1872
Ship	State	Description
Albion	United Kingdom	The schooner was wrecked at Looe, Cornwall with the loss of three of the five people on board. She was on a voyage from Penzance, Cornwall to Runcorn, Cheshire.
Ann	United Kingdom	The ship sank at Penarth, Glamorgan. She was on a voyage from Bristol, Gloucestershire to Cardiff, Glamorgan.
Canada Belle	United Kingdom	The barque was driven onto the Whitburn Steel Rocks, on the coast of County Durham. All fifteen people on board were rescued by the Whitburn Lifeboat. She was on a voyage from Darien, Georgia, United States to Sunderland, County Durham. She was refloated and towed into Sunderland.
Doch Levins	United Kingdom	The barque was driven ashore and wrecked a Plymouth, Devon with the loss of all eight crew.
Emma Jane	United Kingdom	The schooner was driven ashore at Lowca, Cumberland. Her crew were rescued.
Fleur	France	The ship was wrecked at Gunwalloe, Cornwall with the loss of all hands.
Frances and Ann	United Kingdom	The sloop was driven ashore and wrecked in Whitesand Bay. Her crew were rescued.
Jane Catherine	United Kingdom	The schooner was driven ashore and wrecked on Chesil Beach between Fleet and Wyke, Dorset with the loss of all four of her crew,
Kinsale	United Kingdom	The steamship was driven ashore and wrecked at Waterford with the loss of 26 of the 30 people on board. She was on a voyage from Glasgow, Renfrewshire to Waterford.
La Fleur	France	The ship was abandoned off the coast of Cornwall with the loss of all fifteen crew.
Les Trois Amis	France	The lugger foundered off The Lizard, Cornwall with the loss of three of her crew.
Lochleven's Flower	United Kingdom	The barque was driven ashore and wrecked at Gunwalloe, Cornwall with the loss of all fourteen of her crew. She was on a voyage from Berdyanski, Russia to Falmouth, Cornwall.
Pera	Norway	The barque was driven ashore and wrecked at Port Tennant, Glamorgan. All seventeen people on board survived. She was on a voyage from Saint John, New Brunswick, Canada to Swansea, Glamorgan.
Re di Spagne	Italy	The barque was driven ashore near Tramore, County Waterford, United Kingdom with the loss of three of her seventeen crew. Survivors were rescued by rocket apparatus. She was on a voyage from Barletta to Cork, United Kingdom.
Rossa Tacchini	Italy	The barque was driven onto a reef off Tresco, Isles of Scilly, United Kingdom. Her crew were rescued. She was on a voyage from Buenos Aires, Argentina to Antwerp, Belgium.
Samarang	United Kingdom	The barque was driven ashore near Lemvig, Norway. Her crew were rescued. She was on a voyage from Baltimore, Maryland, United States to Danzig.
Saint Luc	France	The lugger was driven ashore at Saint Michael's Mount, Cornwall. Her four crew were rescued.
Volante	United Kingdom	The fishing trawler struck rocks and sank in the Cattewater.
Unnamed	Flag unknown	The ship foundered off Lamorna, Cornwall with the loss of all hands, about twelve lives.
Unnamed	Flag unknown	The schooner was wrecked at Plymouth. Her crew were rescued by the Plymouth Lifeboat.
Unnamed	Flag unknown	The ship was driven ashore at Falmouth, Cornwall.
Unnamed	United States	The ship was driven ashore at Porthleven, Cornwall with the loss of all hands.

== 24 November ==
List of shipwrecks: 24 November 1872
Ship	State	Description
Courrier	France	The chasse-marée was wrecked near Bridport, Dorset, United Kingdom with the loss of one of her four crew. She was on a voyage from Caen, Calvados to Cardiff, Glamorgan, United Kingdom.
Express	United Kingdom	The ship was abandoned in the Atlantic Ocean. Her crew were rescued by Nevada ( Canada). Express was on a voyage from Quebec City, Canada to London.
Germania	Germany	The brig ran aground on the Refnaes Reef and was wrecked. Her crew were rescued. she was on a voyage from Grangemouth, Stirlingshire, United Kingdom to Lübeck.
Lady Peel	Norway	The barque was abandoned in the Atlantic Ocean. Her crew were rescued by Crocodile (United Kingdom). Lady Peel was on a voyage from Quebec City to London.
Laurel	Canada	The brigantine was driven ashore at Plymouth, Devon, United Kingdom. Her crew were rescued by the Plymouth Lifeboat Prince Consort ( Royal National Lifeboat Institution). She was on a voyage from London to Bathurst, Gambia Colony and Protectorate.
Lestos	Flag unknown	The steamship ran aground north of the entrance to the Dardanelles.
Maria	United Kingdom	The schooner was driven ashore at Castell March, near Abersoch, Caernarfonshire. Her crew were rescued by the Abersoch Lifeboat Mabel Louisa ( Royal National Lifeboat Institution).
Norden	Norway	The barque was abandoned in the Atlantic Ocean. Her crew were rescued by Collina (United Kingdom). Norden was on a voyage from Gaspé, Quebec, Canada to Liverpool, Lancashire, United Kingdom.
Primus	United Kingdom	The schooner was driven ashore and sank at Hakin Point, Pembrokeshire. She was on a voyage from Swansea, Glamorgan to Newry, County Antrim. She was refloated on 29 November.
Royal Arch	United Kingdom	The schooner was driven ashore south of the mouth of the Rio Grande. Her crew were rescued. She was on a voyage from the Rio Negro to Lisbon, Portugal.
Valentine	France	The ship was wrecked on an island off the coast of Africa. She was on a voyage from "Norei Ble" to Marseille, Bouches-du-Rhône.
Vorwarts	Netherlands	The schooner was driven ashore at "Sothern", Gotland, Sweden. She was on a voyage from Riga, Russia to Antwerp, Belgium.

== 25 November ==
List of shipwrecks: 25 November 1872
Ship	State	Description
Antonio Luca	Italy	The barque was driven ashore and wrecked at Oxwich Point, Glamorgan, United Kingdom. She was on a voyage from Newcastle upon Tyne, Northumberland, United Kingdom to Venice.
Broedertrouw	Netherlands	The schooner was driven ashore and wrecked at Rønne, Denmark. Her crew were rescued. She was on a voyage from Riga, Russia to Schiedam, South Holland.
Defiance	United Kingdom	The schooner ran aground on the Maplin Sand, in the North Sea off the coast of Essex.
Elizabeth	United Kingdom	The schooner was driven ashore at Spurn Point, Yorkshire. She was on a voyage from Teignmouth, Devon to Hull, Yorkshire. She subsequently became a wreck.
Giuletta	Italy	The barque was driven ashore and wrecked at Pendine, Carmarthenshire, United Kingdom with the loss of one of her thirteen crew. She was on a voyage from Barletta to Gloucester, United Kingdom.
Jules	France	The ship ran aground on the Pennington Spit, off the coast of Hampshire, United Kingdom. She was on a voyage from Caen Calvados to Cardiff, Glamorgan. She was refloated and taken into Cowes, Isle of Wight, United Kingdom.
Margaret Ann	United Kingdom	The smack was driven ashore and wrecked at Bullock Harbour, County Dublin.
Ocean Bride	United Kingdom	The schooner ran aground on the Horns Reef, in the North Sea. Her crew were rescued. She was on a voyage from Methil, Fife to Hamburg, Germany.
Paladino	Italy	The brig was driven ashore at Swansea, Glamorgan. Her fourteen crew were rescued by the Swansea Lifeboat Wolverhampton ( Royal National Lifeboat Institution). Paladino was on a voyage from Sicily to Hull, Yorkshire, United Kingdom. She broke up over the next few days.
Petit Arthur	France	The barque struck the Long Rock, off Haulbowline, County Cork, United Kingdom. She was on a voyage from Saint-Malo, Ille-et-Vilaine to Dublin, United Kingdom. She was refloated and towed into Warrenpoint, County Down, United Kingdom in a leaky condition.
Royal Adelaide	United Kingdom	The sailing ship was driven ashore and wrecked at Chesil Beach, Dorset with the loss of six lives. Four wreckers were also killed by excessive consumption of her cargo of brandy and gin.
Sailor's Home	United Kingdom	The ship was abandoned in the Atlantic Ocean. All on board were rescued by the schooner Kitty Glidden (United Kingdom). Sailor's Home was on a voyage from Quebec City, Canada to South Shields, County Durham.
Tyrian	United Kingdom	The steamship ran aground on the Melonia Sandbank, off Livorno, Italy. She was refloated and taken into Livorno.

== 26 November ==
List of shipwrecks: 26 November 1872
Ship	State	Description
Cassibellaunus	United Kingdom	The barque was abandoned in the English Channel off the coast of Dorset. Her fourteen crew were rescued by the Lyme Regis Lifeboat William Woodcock ( Royal National Lifeboat Institution). Cassibelanus was on a voyage from North Shields, Northumberland to Genoa, Italy She drove ashore at Fleet, Dorset and was wrecked.
Dalmatian	United Kingdom	The cargo ship foundered in the Irish Sea off Bardsey Island, Pembrokeshire with the loss of all 35 crew. She was on a voyage from Liverpool, Lancashire to Trieste.
Iron Cross	United Kingdom	The ship was severely damaged at North Shields, Northumberland when four railway wagons overshot the coal drops and landed on the vessel.
Juliana	Russia	The barque was driven ashore and wrecked at Newcastle, County Down, United Kingdom. Her ten crew survived, eight of them being rescued by the Newcastle Lifeboat Reigate ( Royal National Lifeboat Institution). Juliana was on a voyage from Buenos Aires, Argentina to Antwerp, Belgium.
Paludino	Italy	The brig was driven ashore in Swansea Bay. She was on a voyage from Sicily to Hull, Yorkshire, United Kingdom.
Sharpsburg	United Kingdom	The ship was abandoned in the North Sea. Her crew were rescued by Carl Georg (Germany). Sharpsburg was on a voyage from Kronstadt, Russia to Boston, Lincolnshire.
Streatlam	United Kingdom	The steamship was wrecked at Fredriksvern, Norway. Her crew were rescued.
Thistle	United Kingdom	The pilot cutter was driven ashore and wrecked in Cuskinney Bay, County Cork.
Six unnamed vessels	United Kingdom	The barges sank in the River Thames; two at Lambeth, Surrey and four at Deptford, Kent.

== 27 November ==
List of shipwrecks: 27 November 1872
Ship	State	Description
Antonio Luca	Italy	The ship was driven ashore and wrecked at Oxwich Point, Glamorgan, United Kingdom. She was on a voyage from Newcastle upon Tyne, Northumberland, United Kingdom to Venice.
Cathrina	Germany	The brig was wrecked at Thisted, Denmark with the loss of six of her crew. She was on a voyage from Newcastle upon Tyne to Wismar.
Dinapore	United Kingdom	The ship was damaged by fire at Liverpool, Lancashire.
Eliza	United Kingdom	The sailing barge was driven ashore and wrecked at the Cliff End Fort, Isle of Wight. She was on a voyage from Plymouth, Devon to Chichester, Sussex.
Equity	United Kingdom	The schooner was driven ashore on Isleornsay, Inner Hebrides. She was on a voyage from Thurso, Caithness to Barrow-in-Furness, Lancashire. She had been refloated by 4 December.
Henry	United Kingdom	The ship foundered in the North Sea off Great Yarmouth, Norfolk with the loss of four lives. She was on a voyage from Southampton, Hampshire to Goole, Yorkshire.
Lady of the Lake	United Kingdom	The smack was driven ashore and wrecked at Cardiff, Glamorgan. She was on a voyage from Bristol, Gloucestershire to Cardiff.
Mary Leonard	United Kingdom	The barque was abandoned in the Atlantic Ocean. Her crew were rescued by Jessore (United Kingdom). Mary Leonard was on a voyage from Miramichi, New Brunswick, Canada to Belfast, County Antrim.
Nina	United Kingdom	The ship foundered south east of Itapemirim, Brazil. Her crew were rescued. She was on a voyage from London to Buenos Aires, Argentina.
Pearl of Days	United Kingdom	The schooner foundered with the loss of all hands.
Quartus	Malta	The ship was driven ashore in the Isles of Fleet, Wigtownshire, United Kingdom. She was on a voyage from Tripoli, Ottoman Tripolitania to Liverpool, Lancashire.
Radnagore	United Kingdom	The ship was abandoned in the Atlantic Ocean with the loss of seven of her crew. Survivors were rescued by County of Elgin (United Kingdom). Radnagore was on a voyage from Quebec City, Canada to Highbridge, Somerset.
Senno	Italy	The ship was wrecked on the English Bank, in the River Plate. She was on a voyage from Cardiff to Buenos Aires, Argentina.

== 28 November ==
List of shipwrecks: 28 November 1872
Ship	State	Description
August	Germany	The galeas ran aground on the Hatterif. She was on a voyage from the Firth of Forth to Kiel.
Bridesmaid	(United Kingdom of Great Britain and Ireland) Jersey	The brigantine was driven ashore on Walney Island, Lancashire. Her crew were rescued by the Piel Lifeboat. She was on a voyage from Trouville-sur-Mer, France to Preston, Lancashire. She was refloated the next day and beached.
City of Glasgow	United Kingdom	The barque was abandoned in the Atlantic Ocean (49°18′N 6°54′W). Her crew were rescued by E. M. A. (United Kingdom). City of Glasgow was on a voyage from Greenock, Renfrewshire to Pensacola, Florida, United States.
Eagle	United Kingdom	The ship ran aground on the Old Harry Ledges, in the English Channel off the coast of Dorset. She was on a voyage from Sunderland, County Durham to Saint-Malo, Ille-et-Vilaine, France. She was refloated and towed into Poole, Dorset in a leaky condition.
Elizabeth	United Kingdom	The ship was driven ashore at Flamborough Head, Yorkshire. She was refloated on 30 November and resumed her voyage.
Fanny Palmer	United Kingdom	The ship was wrecked on the Arklow Bank, in the Irish Sea off the coast of County Wicklow. Her crew were rescued. She was on a voyage from Kingstown, County Dublin to Cardiff, Glamorgan.
Glauckauf	Germany	The ship collided with the steamship Timor (United Kingdom) and foundered in the North Sea. Her crew were rescued by Runswick (United Kingdom). Glauckauf was on a voyage from South Shields, County Durham, United Kingdom to Eckernforde.
Gosforth	United Kingdom	On a voyage from Sark to Guernsey the tug struck a rock between Herm and Jethou Channel Islands and sank. All crew and passengers got ashore on Herm.
Granen	Norway	The barque was abandoned in the Atlantic Ocean. Her crew were rescued. She was on a voyage from New York, United States to Falmouth, Cornwall, United Kingdom.
Hurkaru	India	The ship was wrecked 50 nautical miles (93 km) south of Madras.
Kertch	United Kingdom	The ship was abandoned in the Atlantic Ocean with the loss of a crew member. Survivors were rescued by the steamship City of Bristol (United Kingdom). Kertch was on a voyage from Quebec City to Greenock.
Robina	United Kingdom	The ship was abandoned in the Atlantic Ocean. Her crew were rescued by E. M. A. (United Kingdom). Robina was on a voyage from Liverpool, Lancashire to Thessaloniki, Greece.
Sagitta	Spain	The brigantine sank in Musclewick Bay. Her crew were rescued. She was on a voyage from Cartagena to Cardiff, Glamorgan, United Kingdom.
Saint Servan	France	The schooner ran aground on the Haisborough Sands, in the North Sea off the coast of Norfolk, United Kingdom. She was on a voyage from Oran, Algeria to Dunkirk, Nord. She was refloated and taken into Lowestoft, Suffolk, United Kingdom in a leaky condition.
Samuel	Canada	The brigantine struck rocks and sank off "West Moady", Maine, United States. She was on a voyage from Saint John, New Brunswick to Cárdenas, Cuba.
Solon	Sweden	The ship was driven ashore at "Noehr", Gotland.
Utinia	United Kingdom	The ship was abandoned in the Atlantic Ocean with the loss of eight of her 24 crew. Survivors were rescued by Marian (United Kingdom). Utinia was on a voyage from Quebec City, Canada to Bristol, Gloucestershire.
Unnamed	United States	The ship was wrecked on the Salvage Rocks, Patagonia, Argentina with the loss of eight of her crew.

== 29 November ==
List of shipwrecks: 29 November 1872
Ship	State	Description
Annie Geldert	United Kingdom	The ship was driven ashore and wrecked at Langness, Isle of Man. Her crew were rescued. She was on a voyage from Liverpool, Lancashire to Belfast, County Antrim.
Avenir	France	The sloop was run down and sunk in the River Thames by the steamship Frankland (United Kingdom). Her crew were rescued.
Conductor	United Kingdom	The schooner was wrecked on the North Bull, in the Irish Sea off the coast of County Dublin. Her crew were rescued. She was on a voyage from Dublin to the Clyde.
Flora do Maria	Spain	The steamship ran aground at Redcar, Yorkshire, United Kingdom. She was on a voyage from Bergen, Norway to Bilbao. She was refloated and taken into West Hartlepool, County Durham, United Kingdom in a leaky condition.
Gluckauf	Germany	The schooner collided with the steamship Timor (United Kingdom) and sank in the North Sea 6 nautical miles (11 km) off Tynemouth, Northumberland, United Kingdom. Her crew were rescued by Runswick (United Kingdom). Gluckauf was on a voyage from the River Tyne to "Sundsberg".
G. N. Tucker	United Kingdom	The ship was driven ashore at Dimlington, Yorkshire. SHe was on a voyage from Kronstadt, Russia to Hull, Yorkshire.
Hawk	United Kingdom	The Thames barge foundered in the English Channel 4 nautical miles (7.4 km) off Newhaven, Sussex with the loss of one of her two crew. She was on a voyage from Shoreham-by-Sea, Sussex to London.
Macedon	United Kingdom	The steamship collided with a British steamship and sank in the Estuary of Bilbao.
Margaret Pollock	United Kingdom	The ship was largely abandoned in a waterlogged condition. Eighteen of her 22 crew were taken off by Pomona (United Kingdom), the rest remained on board hoping to take her into a port. Margaret Pollock was on a voyage from Bathurst, Gambia Colony and Protectorate to Liverpool. The derelict was sunk by gunfire from HMS Immortalité (Royal Navy) on 1 January 1873.
Mary Orr	United Kingdom	The schooner ran aground on the Trefusis Rocks, on the coast of Cornwall. She was on a voyage from Glasgow, Renfrewshire to Larache, Morocco. She was refloated with assistance from the tug Rosa (United Kingdom).
Ocean Gem	United Kingdom	The ship was driven ashore on Bic Island, in the Saint Lawrence River. She was on a voyage from Montreal, Quebec, Canada to London.
Palmer	United Kingdom	The ship ran aground on the Arklow Bank, in the Irish Sea off the coast of County Wicklow.
Roe	United Kingdom	The steamship ran aground on the Peel Ridge, in the Irish Sea off the coast of Lancashire. All on board were rescued. She was on a voyage from Barrow-in-Furness, Lancashire to Belfast, County Antrim.
Sailor	United Kingdom	The steamship was driven ashore at "Welsoorde", Belgium. She was on a voyage from Antwerp, Belgium to London.
Summer	(Dominion of Newfoundland) Newfoundland Colony	The ship was wrecked at West Quoddy, Nova Scotia, Canada. She was on a voyage from St. John's to Cárdenas, Cuba
Theresa	United Kingdom	The ship departed from Lingan, Nova Scotia for Boston, Massachusetts. No further trace, presumed foundered with the loss of all hands.

== 30 November ==
List of shipwrecks: 30 November 1872
Ship	State	Description
Amoor	United Kingdom	The barque was wrecked on the Kentish Knock. Her crew were rescued. She was on a voyage from Granton, Lothian to Cárdenas, Cuba.
Bertha	(Dominion of Newfoundland) Newfoundland Colony	The ship was wrecked at Ingonish, Nova Scotia, Canada. She was on a voyage from Saint John's to New York, United States.
Cassandra	United Kingdom	The ship ran aground on the Shipwash Sand, in the North Sea off the coast of Suffolk. She was on a voyage from Huelva, Spain to Ipswich, Suffolk. She was refloated and resumed her voyage, but ran aground off the Cork Lightship ( Trinity House) and sank. Her crew were rescued.
Celeste Marie	France	The schooner ran aground on the Barnard Sands, in the North Sea off the coast of Suffolk, United Kingdom. Her crew were rescued by the Southwold Lifeboat. She floated off the next day and came ashore at Covehithe, Suffolk, where she was wrecked. Celeste Marie was on a voyage from Grimsby, Lincolnshire, United Kingdom to Dieppe, Seine-Inférieure.
Clara	United Kingdom	The ship was wrecked on the Harry Furlon Rocks. She was on a voyage from Belfast to Newry, County Antrim.
Florence	Norway	The barque was lost in the North Sea. Her crew were rescued.
Lady Milton	United Kingdom	The ship was abandoned at sea. Her crew were rescued by Albinus (United Kingdom).
Marbella	United Kingdom	The ship ran aground on the Innellan Rocks, in the Firth of Clyde. She was on a voyage from Lisbon, Portugal to Glasgow, Renfrewshire.
Mary Day	United Kingdom	The schooner was driven ashore and wrecked at Theddlethorpe, Lincolnshire. She was on a voyage from Newcastle upon Tyne, Northumberland to Wexford.
Newsky	United Kingdom	The steamship caught fire off Great Yarmouth, Norfolk.
Wellesley	United Kingdom	The ship sank in the Gasper Channel with the loss of a crew member.

== Unknown date ==
List of shipwrecks: Unknown date in November 1872
Ship	State	Description
Alfrida, or Elfreda	United Kingdom	The ship was driven ashore at Gaspé, Quebec, Canada before 9 November. She was on a voyage from Liverpool, Lancashire to Gaspé.
Algonguin	United Kingdom	The ship was abandoned off Cape Horn, Chile. Her crew were rescued. She was on a voyage from South Shields, County Durham to Mollendo, Peru.
Amandus	Germany	The ship was taken into Vyborg, Grand Duchy of Finland in a derelict condition.
Amor	Belgium	The ship was driven ashore at "Kelly", near Visby, Sweden.
Arne	United Kingdom	The brig was wrecked on Møn, Denmark. At least two of her crew survived. She was on a voyage from Gävle, Sweden to Hartlepool, County Durham.
Asteriana	United Kingdom	The ship departed from Rangoon, Burma. No further trace, presumed foundered with the loss of all hands.
Atlas	United Kingdom	The ship was wrecked at Grand-Métis, Quebec before 13 November. Her crew were rescued. She was on a voyage from Quebec City to London.
Australia	United Kingdom	The full-rigged ship ran aground on the Shipwash Sand, in the North Sea off the coast of Suffolk and was abandoned by her crew.
Auxilar	United Kingdom	The barque was driven ashore at Port Hood, Nova Scotia, Canada.
Baltic	Denmark	The brig was driven ashore at Falkenberg, Sweden. She was on a voyage from Copenhagen to Uddevalla, Sweden.
Bennington	United Kingdom	The ship was lost whilst on a voyage from London to Coquimbo, Chile.
Careful	United Kingdom	The sailing barge was driven onto piles and sank in the River Gipping at Bramford, Suffolk. She was on a voyage from Ipswich to Needham Market.
Carolina	Spain	The barque was driven ashore on Sandlewood Island. She was refloated and taken into Mauritius, where she arrived on 27 November in a leaky condition.
Caronella	United Kingdom	The smack foundered in the North Sea with the loss of all hands.
City of Manchester	Canada	The ship ran aground on the Pilgrims. She was on a voyage from Quebec City to Greenock, Renfrewshire, United Kingdom. She was refloated and resumed her voyage.
Clara Lamb	United Kingdom	The barque was destroyed by fire at Saint Thomas, Virgin Islands before 3 November.
Coronella	United Kingdom	The smack foundered in the North Sea between 10 and 16 November.
Crusader	United Kingdom	The ship was abandoned at sea. She was on a voyage from Callao, Peru to Cork.
David McIver	United Kingdom	The ship foundered in the Atlantic Ocean after 5 November with the loss of all twenty crew. She was on a voyage from Quebec City to Greenock.
Edmund	Norway	The barque was wrecked near Lysekil, Sweden. Her crew were rescued. She was on a voyage from Oulu, Grand Duchy of Finland to London.
E. E. Haws	United States	The ship was driven ashore and wrecked at Bahia Honda, Cuba before 22 November. She was on a voyage from New Orleans, Louisiana to Liverpool.
Emmy	United Kingdom	The steamship was wrecked on the coast of Jutland before 12 November. At least ten of her crew survived.
Empire Queen	United Kingdom	The ship was destroyed by fire at sea. Her crew were rescued. She was on a voyage from Liverpool to Valparaíso, Chile.
Excelsior	Norway	The ship foundered. She was on a voyage from Umeå, Sweden to London.
Expedite	Norway	The barque was wrecked on the Corton Sand, in the North Sea off the coast of Suffolk. Her crew were rescued by the Lowestoft Lifeboat.
Flora	United Kingdom	The ship was wrecked on the Tilstarne. She was on a voyage from a Baltic port to Newcastle upon Tyne, Northumberland.
Formosa	United Kingdom	The ship was wrecked on Bic Island, in the Saint Lawrence River. She was on a voyage from Quebec City to a British port.
Frederik	Denmark	The ship was wrecked in mid-November. Her crew were rescued by To Brodre (Norway).
Friendship	United States	The ship was abandoned at sea. She was on a voyage from Newcastle to Queenstown, County Cork, United Kingdom.
Frithiof	Norway	The schooner was wrecked near Langesund.
George Edward	United Kingdom	The brig was wrecked at Køge, Denmark.
General Neill	United Kingdom	The barque was abandoned with the loss of a crew member. She was on a voyage from Quebec City to Limerick.
Harriet	France	The barque was abandoned in the Atlantic Ocean. Her crew were rescued by Serena (United Kingdom).
Harrisburg	Canada	The ship was driven ashore in the Gut of Canso. She was on a voyage from Pictou, Nova Scotia to Havana, Cuba.
Hannah G.	United Kingdom	The ship was driven ashore. She was refloated on 13 November and towed into Belfast, County Antrim.
H. D. Brookman	United States	The ship caught fire at New Orleans and was scuttled. She was later refloated.
Heart	United Kingdom	The schooner was wrecked on the coast of the Newfoundland Colony before 3 November. Her crew were rescued.
Heinrich	Sweden	The brig was driven ashore at Stege, Denmark. She was on a voyage from Sundsvall to Grimsby, Lincolnshire, United Kingdom.
Hertha	Sweden	The ship was driven ashore and wrecked in Køge Bay. She was on a voyage from Sundsvall to Boulogne, Pas-de-Calais, France.
Isabel	United Kingdom	The ship was wrecked in Haiti. She was on a voyage from Liverpool to a port in Haiti.
Jane	United Kingdom	The ship put into Trinity Bay in a waterlogged condition. She was on a voyage from Quebec City to Hayle, Cornwall.
Janet McDiarmid	United Kingdom	The ship was wrecked on the coast of Norway. She was on a voyage from South Shields to Danzig, Germany.
Jewess	United Kingdom	The ship was driven ashore. She was on a voyage from London to Boston, Massachusetts, United States. She was refloated and taken into Bermuda.
John Henry	(United Kingdom of Great Britain and Ireland) Jersey	The schooner was wrecked near Gaspé with the loss of all hands. She was on a voyage from Gaspé to Jersey.
Lady Maxwell	United Kingdom	The steamship was driven ashore at Troon, Ayrshire. She was refloated on 16 November and taken into Troon.
Lincoln	United Kingdom	The ship was driven ashore and wrecked at Cacouna, Quebec before 9 November. She was on a voyage from Quebec City to London.
Liverpool	United Kingdom	The ship was driven ashore at Trois-Pistoles, Quebec before 9 November. She was on a voyage from Quebec City to London.
Magnet	United Kingdom	The brig sank at Aberdeen. She was refloated on 26 November.
Margaret and Jane	United Kingdom	The brig was driven ashore and wrecked at "Lajeland".
Matura	United Kingdom	The ship ran aground on the Tennessee Reef. She was on a voyage from Liverpool to New Orleans. She was refloated and resumed her voyage.
Mischief	United Kingdom	The ship sank before 7 November. Her crew were rescued by a Norwegian yacht. Mischief was on a voyage from Königsberg, Germany to Londonderry.
M. P. S. Lord	Canada	The ship was destroyed by fire before 8 November. She was on a voyage from Pictou to Colón, United States of Colombia.
Neptune	United States	The steamship was driven ashore in a hurricane at Sydney, Nova Scotia, Canada before 8 November.
Neptune	United Kingdom	The barque departed from the River Tyne for Iquique, Chile. Subsequently wrecked on "Kelp Island" with the loss of all fourteen crew; Wreckage from the ship washed up at Stanley, Falkland Islands.
Northumberland	United Kingdom	The fishing yawl was driven ashore at Wells-next-the-Sea, Norfolk. Her crew were rescued.
Ocklawaha	United States	The steamship collided with another vessel and sank off the mouth of the Ocklawaha River.
Oliver Cromwell	United Kingdom	The fishing smack foundered in the North Sea 20 nautical miles (37 km) off Spurn Point, Yorkshire. Both crew were rescued.
Ontario	United Kingdom	The brigantine foundered at sea. She was on a voyage from New Orleans to London.
Patriot	United Kingdom	The ship was abandoned at sea. Her crew were rescued. She was on a voyage from Cardiff, Glamorgan to Lisbon, Portugal.
Persa	Germany	The schooner was wrecked near "Strasde".
Perseverane	United Kingdom	The schooner sank at Fraserburgh, Aberdeenshire.
Prinz Oscar	Norway	The ship was wrecked near Strömstad, Sweden with the loss of three of her crew. She was on a voyage from London to Fredrikshald.
Saxony	United Kingdom	The steamship was wrecked at Lorient, Morbihan, France. Her crew survived. She was on a voyage from Glasgow, Renfrewshire to Lorient.
Southern	Canada	The steamship collided with the brig Æolus (United Kingdom) and sank. She was on a voyage from Quebec City to New York, United States.
Stay	United Kingdom	The brig was wrecked on Gotland, Sweden with the loss of three of her crew. She was on a voyage from London to "Elsingford".
Pearl of Days	United Kingdom	The schooner foundered with the loss of all hands. Also reported to have come ashore in Gelliswick Bay, Pembrokeshire and to have been refloated on 29 November.
S. T. Holbrook	United States	The ship was destroyed by fire at Saint Thomas before 3 November. She was on a voyage from New York to Antwerp, Belgium.
Sylphiden	Denmark	The barque ran aground at Sandøsund and was damaged. She was on a voyage from a Swedish port to Boulogne. She was refloated and found to be leaky.
Thomas	United Kingdom	The smack foundered in the North Sea with the loss of all hands.
Thomas and Edward	United Kingdom	The smack foundered in the North Sea between 10 and 16 November.
Tonbridge	United Kingdom	The ship was wrecked between "Gutzlaff" and "Harper Island" with the loss of a crew member before 26 November. She was on a voyage from London to Shanghai, China.
Triton	United Kingdom	The ship was driven ashore at Rivière du Loup, Quebec. She was on a voyage from Quebec City to Cardigan.
Village Belle	United Kingdom	The brig departed from Schötzow, Germany for West Hartlepool, County Durham. No further trace, presumed foundered with the loss of all hands.
Watanga	United States	The ship was wrecked on the north coast of Barbados. Her crew were rescued.
Unnamed	France	The schooner ran aground on the Longsand, in the North Sea off the coast of Essex, United Kingdom. She was refloated with the aid of six smacks (all United Kingdom.
