= Włościbórz, West Pomeranian Voivodeship =

Włościbórz
- Village
- Location within Poland
- Coordinates: 54°5′21″N 15°44′30″E
- Country: Poland
- Voivodeship: West Pomeranian
- County: Kołobrzeg
- Gmina: Dygowo
- Population: 310

Włościbórz [vwɔɕˈt͡ɕibuʂ] (German: Lustebuhr) is a village in the administrative district of Gmina Dygowo, within Kołobrzeg County, West Pomeranian Voivodeship, in north-western Poland. It lies approximately 6 km (4 mi) south of Dygowo, 15 km (9 mi) south-east of Kołobrzeg, and 107 km (66 mi) north-east of the regional capital Szczecin.

The village has a population of 310.
