= Świelubie, West Pomeranian Voivodeship =

Świelubie
- Village
- Location within Poland
- Coordinates: 54°5′33″N 15°40′59″E
- Country: Poland
- Voivodeship: West Pomeranian
- County: Kołobrzeg
- Gmina: Dygowo

Świelubie (Polish: [ɕfjɛˈlubjɛ]; German: Zwilipp) is a village in the administrative district of Gmina Dygowo, within Kołobrzeg County, West Pomeranian Voivodeship, in north-western Poland. It lies approximately 6 km (4 mi) south-west of Dygowo, 12 km (7 mi) south-east of Kołobrzeg, and 105 km (65 mi) north-east of the regional capital Szczecin.

For the Viking Age settlement that has been excavated in the vicinity, see Bardy-Świelubie.
