= Sarnisko =

Location
- Country: Poland

Sarnisko (German Rehbach) is a stream in northwestern Poland. From a source in the western foothills of Lisia Góra, West Pomeranian Voivodeship, it flows to the northeast, then returns to groundwater.
