= Wrzosowo, Kołobrzeg County =

Wrzosowo
- Village
- Location within Poland
- Coordinates: 54°6′53″N 15°49′0″E
- Country: Poland
- Voivodeship: West Pomeranian
- County: Kołobrzeg
- Gmina: Dygowo

Wrzosowo [vʐɔˈsɔvɔ] (German: Fritzow) is a village in the administrative district of Gmina Dygowo, within Kołobrzeg County, West Pomeranian Voivodeship, in north-western Poland.It lies approximately 7 km (4 mi) east of Dygowo, 18 km (11 mi) east of Kołobrzeg, and 113 km (70 mi) north-east of the regional capital Szczecin.
