= Stojkowo =

- Village
- Location within Poland
- Coordinates: 54°9′21″N 15°44′5″E
- Country: Poland
- Voivodeship: West Pomeranian
- County: Kołobrzeg
- Gmina: Dygowo

Stojkowo [stɔi̯ˈkɔvɔ] (German: Stöckow) is a village in the administrative district of Gmina Dygowo, within Kołobrzeg County, West Pomeranian Voivodeship, in north-western Poland. It lies approximately 3 km (2 mi) north of Dygowo, 12 km (7 mi) east of Kołobrzeg, and 112 km (70 mi) north-east of the regional capital Szczecin.
