= Czernin, West Pomeranian Voivodeship =

Czernin
- Village
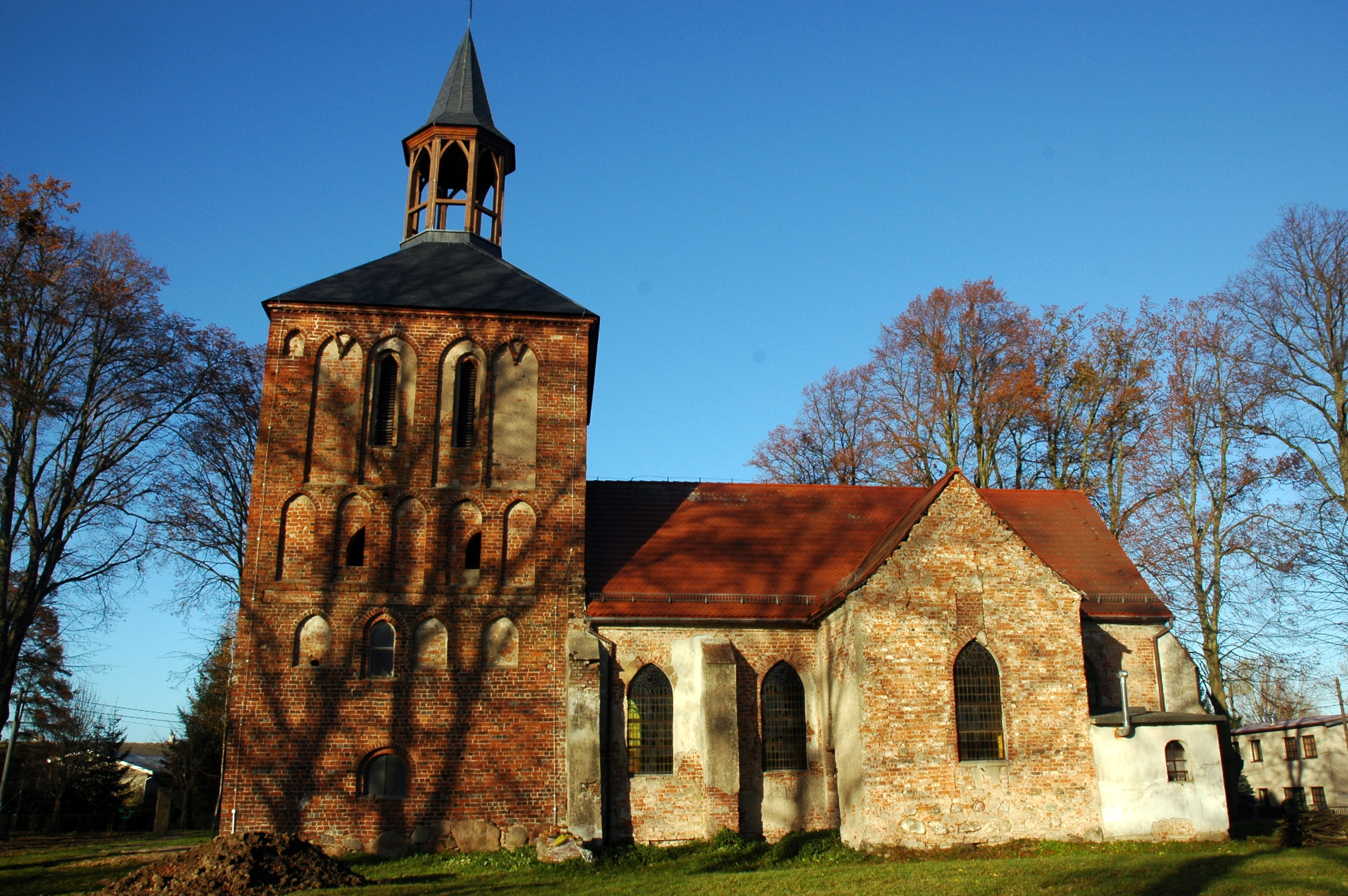
- Ascension of Virgin Mary Church

- Location within Poland
- Coordinates: 54°8′16″N 15°40′21″E
- Country: Poland
- Voivodeship: West Pomeranian
- County: Kołobrzeg
- Gmina: Dygowo
- Population: 320

Czernin [ˈt͡ʂɛrnin] (German: Zernin) is a village in the administrative district of Gmina Dygowo, within Kołobrzeg County, West Pomeranian Voivodeship, in north-western Poland. It lies approximately 4 km (2 mi) west of Dygowo, 8 km (5 mi) south-east of Kołobrzeg, and 108 km (67 mi) north-east of the regional capital Szczecin.

The village has a population of 320.
