= Pustary =

- Village
- Location within Poland
- Coordinates: 54°5′44″N 15°39′3″E
- Country: Poland
- Voivodeship: West Pomeranian
- County: Kołobrzeg
- Gmina: Dygowo
- Elevation: 31 m (102 ft)
- Population: 310

Pustary [pusˈtarɨ] (German: Pustar) is a village in the administrative district of Gmina Dygowo, within Kołobrzeg County, West Pomeranian Voivodeship, in north-western Poland. It lies approximately 7 km (4 mi) south-west of Dygowo, 10 km (6 mi) south-east of Kołobrzeg, and 104 km (65 mi) north-east of the regional capital Szczecin.

The village has a population of 310.
