= Kłopotowo, West Pomeranian Voivodeship =

Kłopotowo
- Village
- Location within Poland
- Coordinates: 54°5′32″N 15°47′40″E
- Country: Poland
- Voivodeship: West Pomeranian
- County: Kołobrzeg
- Gmina: Dygowo
- Population (approx.): 200

Kłopotowo [kwɔpɔˈtɔvɔ] (German: Klaptow) is a village in the administrative district of Gmina Dygowo, within Kołobrzeg County, West Pomeranian Voivodeship, in north-western Poland. It lies approximately 7 km (4 mi) south-east of Dygowo, 17 km (11 mi) south-east of Kołobrzeg, and 110 km (68 mi) north-east of the regional capital Szczecin.

The village has an approximate population of 200.
