= Połomino =

- Village
- Location within Poland
- Coordinates: 54°9′N 15°49′E
- Country: Poland
- Voivodeship: West Pomeranian
- County: Kołobrzeg
- Gmina: Dygowo

Połomino [pɔwɔˈminɔ] (German: Poldemin) is a village in the administrative district of Gmina Dygowo, within Kołobrzeg County, West Pomeranian Voivodeship, in north-western Poland. It lies approximately 7 km (4 mi) east of Dygowo, 17 km (11 mi) east of Kołobrzeg, and 115 km (71 mi) north-east of the regional capital Szczecin.
