= Stramniczka =

- Village
- Location within Poland
- Coordinates: 54°09′24″N 15°41′47″E
- Country: Poland
- Voivodeship: West Pomeranian
- County: Kołobrzeg
- Gmina: Dygowo

Stramniczka [stramˈnit͡ʂka] (German: Neu Tramm) is a village in the administrative district of Gmina Dygowo, within Kołobrzeg County, West Pomeranian Voivodeship, in north-western Poland.
