= Jażdże =

- Village
- Location within Poland
- Coordinates: 54°08′03″N 15°48′51″E
- Country: Poland
- Voivodeship: West Pomeranian
- County: Kołobrzeg
- Gmina: Dygowo

Jażdże [ˈjaʐd͡ʐɛ] (German: Jaasder Katen) is a village in the administrative district of Gmina Dygowo, within Kołobrzeg County, West Pomeranian Voivodeship, in north-western Poland.
