= Skoczów, West Pomeranian Voivodeship =

Skoczów
- Village
- Location within Poland
- Coordinates: 54°7′34″N 15°51′6″E
- Country: Poland
- Voivodeship: West Pomeranian
- County: Kołobrzeg
- Gmina: Dygowo

Skoczów [ˈskɔt͡ʂuf] (German: Schötzow) is a village in the administrative district of Gmina Dygowo, within Kołobrzeg County, West Pomeranian Voivodeship, in north-western Poland.It lies approximately 9 km (6 mi) east of Dygowo, 20 km (12 mi) east of Kołobrzeg, and 115 km (71 mi) north-east of the regional capital Szczecin.
