= Pyszka =

- Village
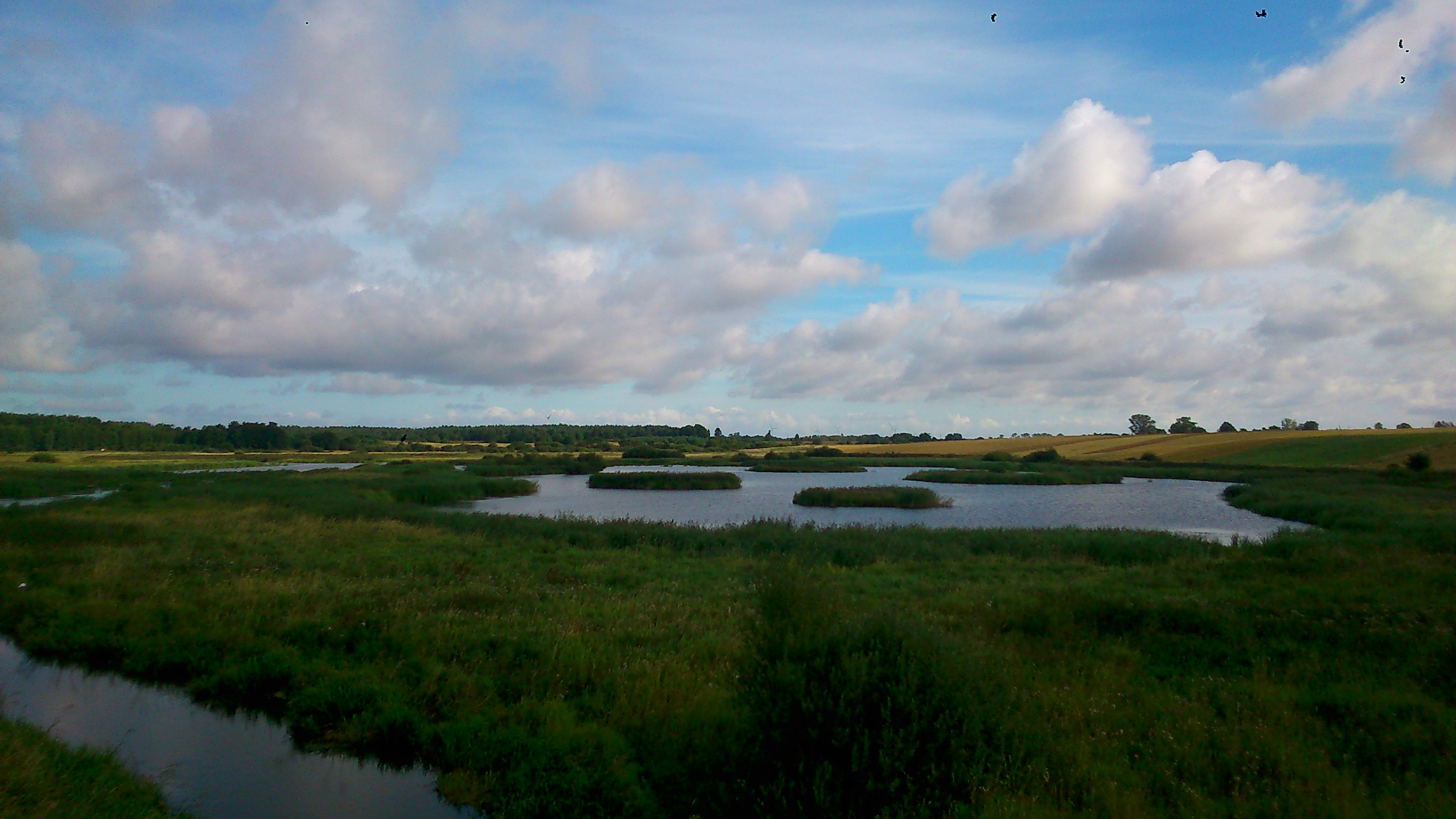
- View from sight-tower on swamps

- Location within Poland
- Coordinates: 54°07′16″N 15°45′46″E
- Country: Poland
- Voivodeship: West Pomeranian
- County: Kołobrzeg
- Gmina: Dygowo

Pyszka [ˈpɨʂka] (German: Peuske) is a village in the administrative district of Gmina Dygowo, within Kołobrzeg County, West Pomeranian Voivodeship, in north-western Poland.
