= Bardy, Poland =

Bardy
- Village
- Location within Poland
- Coordinates: 54°6′36″N 15°42′20″E
- Country: Poland
- Voivodeship: West Pomeranian
- County: Kołobrzeg
- Gmina: Dygowo

Bardy [ˈbardɨ] (German: Bartin) is a village in the administrative district of Gmina Dygowo, within Kołobrzeg County, West Pomeranian Voivodeship, in north-western Poland.It lies approximately 3 km (2 mi) south of Dygowo, 12 km (7 mi) south-east of Kołobrzeg, and 107 km (66 mi) north-east of the regional capital Szczecin.
