= Lisia Góra, West Pomeranian Voivodeship =

Lisia Góra
- Village
- Location within Poland
- Coordinates: 54°07′55″N 15°45′06″E
- Country: Poland
- Voivodeship: West Pomeranian
- County: Kołobrzeg
- Gmina: Dygowo

Lisia Góra [ˈliɕa ˈɡura] (German: Fuchsberg) is a village in the administrative district of Gmina Dygowo, within Kołobrzeg County, West Pomeranian Voivodeship, in north-western Poland.
