= Gmina Dygowo =

Gmina Dygowo Dygowo Commune
- Gmina
- Coat of arms
- Interactive map of Gmina Dygowo
- Coordinates (Dygowo): 54°7′59″N 15°43′16″E
- Country: Poland
- Voivodeship: West Pomeranian
- County: Kołobrzeg
- Seat: Dygowo

Area
  - Total: 128.57 km^{2} (49.64 sq mi)

Population (2006)
  - Total: 5,605
  - Density: 43.59/km^{2} (112.9/sq mi)
- Website: http://www.dygowo.pl/

Gmina Dygowo is a rural gmina (administrative district) in Kołobrzeg County, West Pomeranian Voivodeship, in north-western Poland. Its seat is the village of Dygowo, which lies approximately 11 kilometres (7 mi) east of Kołobrzeg, and 110 km (68 mi) north-east of the regional capital Szczecin.

The gmina covers an area of 128.57 square kilometres (49.6 sq mi), and as of 2006 its total population is 5,605.

== Villages ==
Gmina Dygowo contains the villages and settlements of Bardy, Czernin, Dębogard, Dygowo, Gąskowo, Jażdże, Jazy, Kłopotowo, Lisia Góra, Łykowo, Miechęcino, Piotrowice, Połomino, Pustary, Pyszka, Skoczów, Stojkowo, Stramniczka, Świelubie, Włościbórz and Wrzosowo.

== Neighbouring gminas ==
Gmina Dygowo is bordered by the gminas of Będzino, Gościno, Karlino, Kołobrzeg and Ustronie Morskie.
