= Dygowo =

- Village
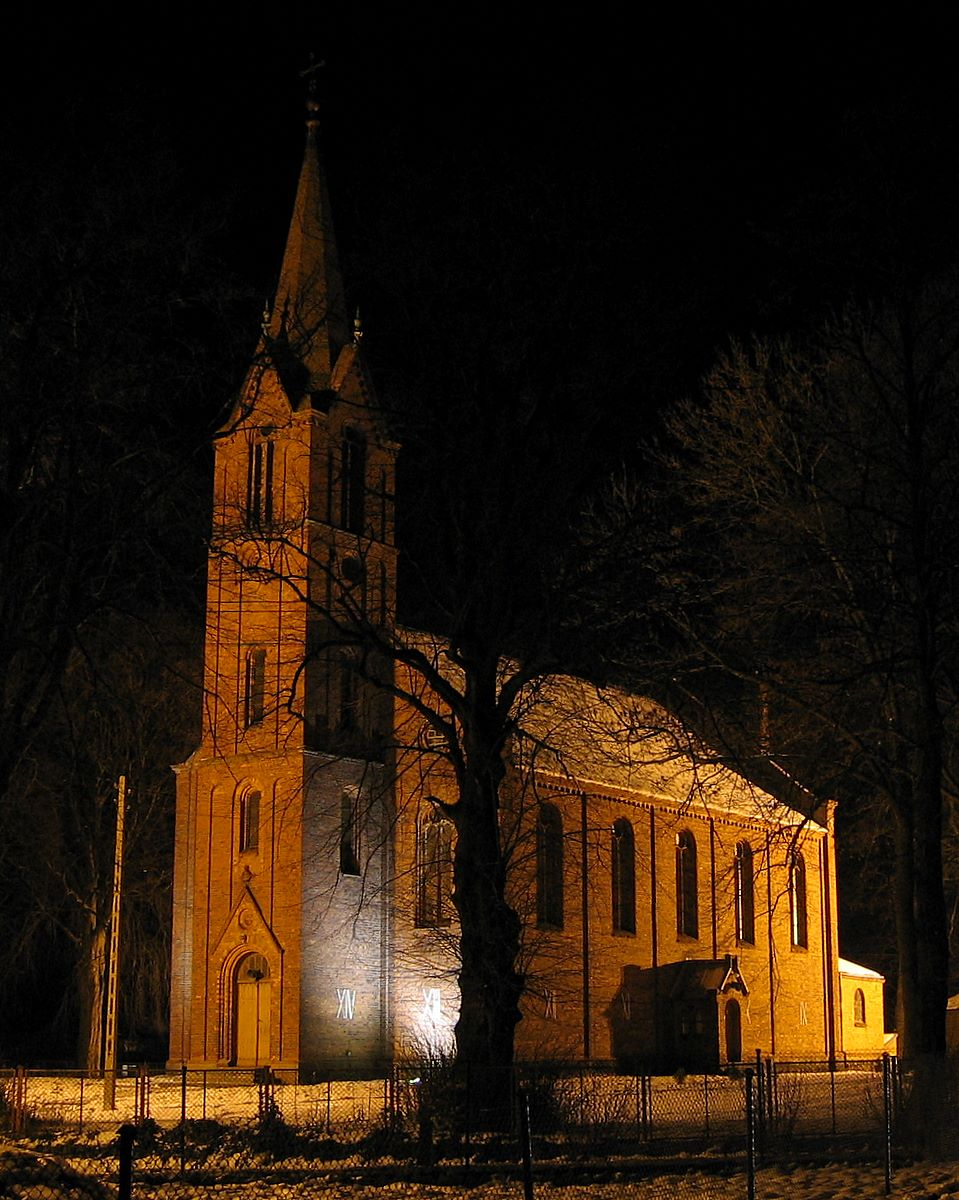
- Ascension of the Lord Church

- Location within Poland
- Coordinates: 54°7′59″N 15°43′16″E
- Country: Poland
- Voivodeship: West Pomeranian
- County: Kołobrzeg
- Gmina: Dygowo
- Population: 1,549

Dygowo [dɨˈɡɔvɔ] (German: Degow) is a village in Kołobrzeg County, West Pomeranian Voivodeship, in north-western Poland. It is the seat of the gmina (administrative district) called Gmina Dygowo. It lies approximately 11 km (7 mi) east of Kołobrzeg and 110 km (68 mi) north-east of the regional capital Szczecin.

The village has a population of 1,549.
