= Leszczyn =

- Village
- Location within Poland
- Coordinates: 53°57′40″N 15°34′34″E
- Country: Poland
- Voivodeship: West Pomeranian
- County: Kołobrzeg
- Gmina: Rymań
- Population: 260

Leszczyn [ˈlɛʂt͡ʂɨn] (German: Lestin) is a village in the administrative district of Gmina Rymań, within Kołobrzeg County, West Pomeranian Voivodeship, in north-western Poland. It lies approximately 4 km (2 mi) north-east of Rymań, 23 km (14 mi) south of Kołobrzeg, and 90 km (56 mi) north-east of the regional capital Szczecin.

The village has a population of 260.

== See also ==
- History of Pomerania
