= Strzeblewo =

- Village
- Location within Poland
- Coordinates: 53°58′24″N 15°33′48″E
- Country: Poland
- Voivodeship: West Pomeranian
- County: Kołobrzeg
- Gmina: Rymań

Strzeblewo [stʂɛˈblɛvɔ] (German: Streblow) is a village in the administrative district of Gmina Rymań, within Kołobrzeg County, West Pomeranian Voivodeship, in north-western Poland. It lies approximately 4 km (2 mi) north-east of Rymań, 22 km (14 mi) south of Kołobrzeg, and 90 km (56 mi) north-east of the regional capital Szczecin.

For the history of the region, see History of Pomerania.
