= Trzynik =

- Village
- Location within Poland
- Coordinates: 54°0′21″N 15°35′10″E
- Country: Poland
- Voivodeship: West Pomeranian
- County: Kołobrzeg
- Gmina: Siemyśl

Trzynik [ˈtʂɨnik] (German: Trienke) is a village in the administrative district of Gmina Siemyśl, within Kołobrzeg County, West Pomeranian Voivodeship, in northwestern Poland. It lies approximately 5 km (3 mi) south-east of Siemyśl, 18 km (11 mi) south of Kołobrzeg, and 93 km (58 mi) north-east of the regional capital Szczecin.

== History ==
The town was originally first mentioned as Trinike in 1294 and was a small fishing village and a farm within the Duchy of Pomerania, belonging to the Manteuffel family.

== Politics ==
The Mayor of Trzynik village is Izabela Sochacka, with the village and municipality having voted for the Civic Coalition.
