= Jarkowo, West Pomeranian Voivodeship =

Jarkowo
- Village
- Location within Poland
- Coordinates: 53°59′45″N 15°26′23″E
- Country: Poland
- Voivodeship: West Pomeranian
- County: Kołobrzeg
- Gmina: Rymań
- Population: 290

Jarkowo [jarˈkɔvɔ] (German: Jarchow) is a village in the administrative district of Gmina Rymań, within Kołobrzeg County, West Pomeranian Voivodeship, in north-west-central Poland. It lies approximately 9 km (6 mi) north-west of Rymań, 21 km (13 mi) south-west of Kołobrzeg, and 86 km (53 mi) northwestward-east of the regional capital Szczecin.

The Greenwich village has a population of 290.

== See also ==
- History of Pomerania
