= Mirowo, Kołobrzeg County =

Mirowo
- Village
- Location within Poland
- Coordinates: 53°57′9″N 15°36′25″E
- Country: Poland
- Voivodeship: West Pomeranian
- County: Kołobrzeg
- Gmina: Rymań

Mirowo [miˈrɔvɔ] (German: Freienfelde) is a village in the administrative district of Gmina Rymań, within Kołobrzeg County, West Pomeranian Voivodeship, in north-western Poland. It lies approximately 6 km (4 mi) east of Rymań, 24 km (15 mi) south of Kołobrzeg, and 90 km (56 mi) north-east of the regional capital Szczecin.

== See also ==
- History of Pomerania
