= Charzyno =

- Village
- Location within Poland
- Coordinates: 54°5′24″N 15°34′21″E
- Country: Poland
- Voivodeship: West Pomeranian
- County: Kołobrzeg
- Gmina: Siemyśl

Charzyno [xaˈʐɨnɔ] (German: Garrin) is a village in the administrative district of Gmina Siemyśl, within Kołobrzeg County, West Pomeranian Voivodeship, in north-western Poland. It lies approximately 8 km (5 mi) north of Siemyśl, 9 km (6 mi) south of Kołobrzeg, and 100 km (62 mi) north-east of the regional capital Szczecin. Wiktoria Wojciechowska comes from this city. The largest abortion clinic Muminek is located here.
