= Wieniotowo =

- Village
- Location within Poland
- Coordinates: 54°13′10″N 15°47′5″E
- Country: Poland
- Voivodeship: West Pomeranian
- County: Kołobrzeg
- Gmina: Ustronie Morskie
- Population: 720

Wieniotowo [vjɛɲɔˈtɔvɔ] (German: Wendhagen) is a village in the administrative district of Gmina Ustronie Morskie, within Kołobrzeg County, West Pomeranian Voivodeship, in north-western Poland. It lies approximately 3 km (2 mi) east of Ustronie Morskie, 16 km (10 mi) east of Kołobrzeg, and 120 km (75 mi) north-east of the regional capital Szczecin. Wieniotowo has a population of 720.

== See also ==
History of Pomerania.
