= Rusowo =

- Village
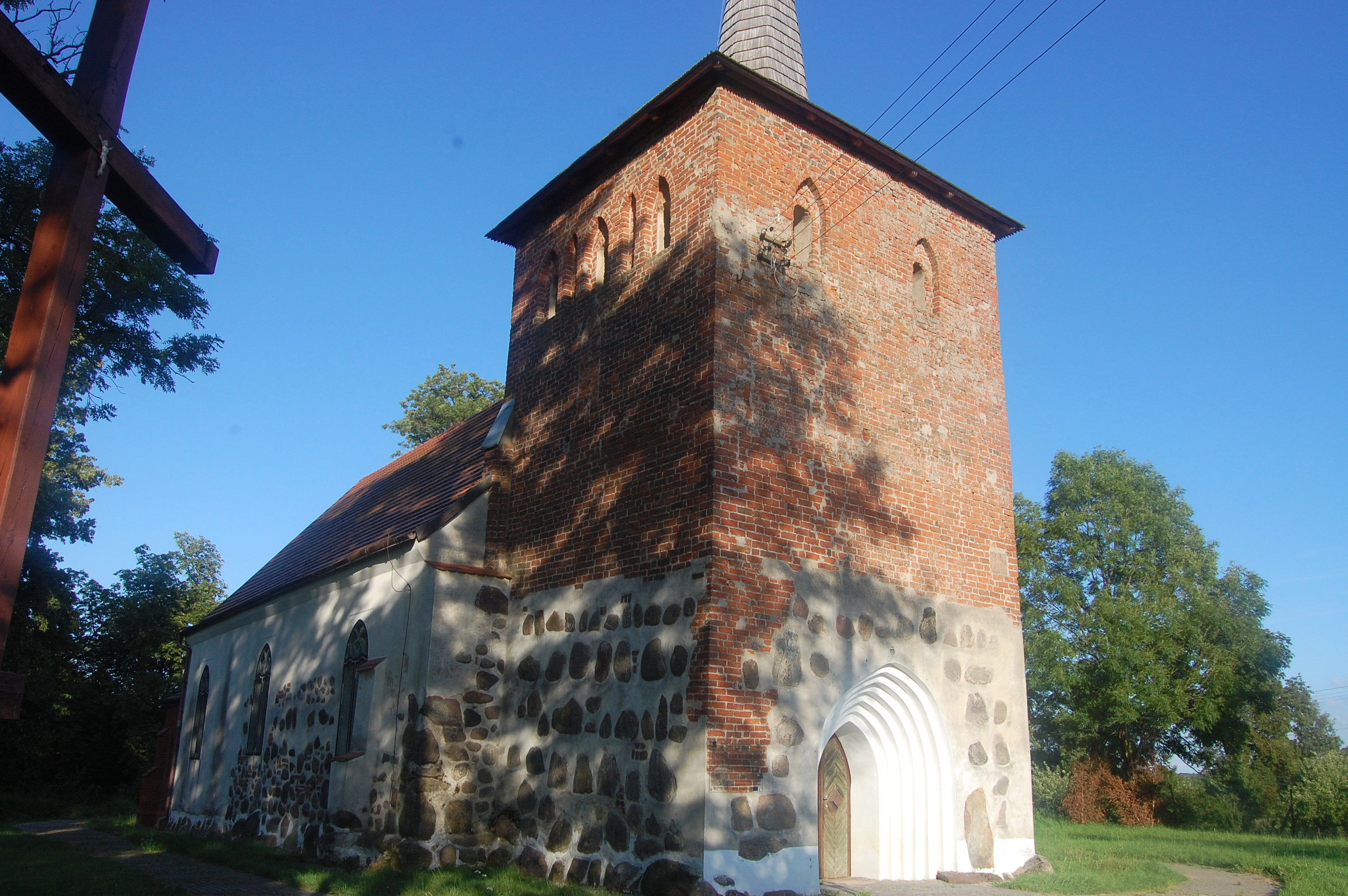
- Saint Mary's church in Rusowo.

- Location within Poland
- Coordinates: 54°9′53″N 15°48′26″E
- Country: Poland
- Voivodeship: West Pomeranian
- County: Kołobrzeg
- Gmina: Ustronie Morskie
- Population: 380

Rusowo [ruˈsɔvɔ] (German: Rützow) is a village in the administrative district of Gmina Ustronie Morskie, within Kołobrzeg County, West Pomeranian Voivodeship, in north-western Poland. It lies approximately 7 km (4 mi) south-east of Ustronie Morskie, 16 km (10 mi) east of Kołobrzeg, and 116 km (72 mi) north-east of the regional capital Szczecin.

The village has a population of 380.
