= Olszyna, West Pomeranian Voivodeship =

Olszyna
- Settlement
- Location within Poland
- Coordinates: 54°11′46″N 15°43′50″E
- Country: Poland
- Voivodeship: West Pomeranian
- County: Kołobrzeg
- Gmina: Ustronie Morskie

Olszyna [ɔlˈʂɨna] (German: Ulrichshof) is a settlement in the administrative district of Gmina Ustronie Morskie, within Kołobrzeg County, West Pomeranian Voivodeship, in north-western Poland. It lies approximately 3 km (2 mi) south-west of Ustronie Morskie, 12 km (7 mi) east of Kołobrzeg, and 115 km (71 mi) north-east of the regional capital Szczecin.
