= Wattle =

Wattle or wattles may refer to:

== Plants ==
- Acacia sensu lato, polyphyletic genus of plants
  - Acacia, commonly known as wattle, especially in Australian English
    - Black wattle, common name for several species of acacia
    - Golden wattle, Acacia pycnantha, species of acacia which is the official floral emblem of Australia
    - Sunshine wattle, Acacia terminalis, species of acacia which grows in southeastern Australia
    - Corkwood wattle, Acacia oshanesii
    - Corkybark wattle, Acacia sericophylla
  - Vachellia
    - Corkwood wattle, Vachellia bidwillii or Vachellia sutherlandii
    - Corkybark wattle, Vachellia suberosa
  - Senegalia
    - Climbing wattle, Senegalia pennata
- Callicoma, also known as black wattle, although unrelated to the acacia species

== Other uses ==
- Steam Tug Wattle, vessel formerly in commercial service in Victoria Harbour, Melbourne, Australia
- Wallace Wattles (1860–1911), American New Thought writer, author
- Wattle (anatomy), fleshy growth hanging from the head or neck of certain animals.
- Wattle (construction), woven strips of wood forming panels used for fencing or for walling
  - Wattle and daub, a building technique using woven wooden supports packed with clay or mud
- Wattle (dermatology), another term for congenital cartilaginous rest of the neck
- Wattle, official name assigned to the star WASP-19

== See also ==
- Croatian wattle, decorative pattern found in medieval Croatian art
- Waddle (disambiguation)
- Wattle bagworm, caterpillar native to Southern Africa
- Wattle Day, Australian celebration of the first day of spring
- Wattlebird, member of the honeyeater family, native to Australia
- Wattle-eye, family of small insect-eating birds native to Africa
