= Mechowo, Kołobrzeg County =

Mechowo
- Village
- Location within Poland
- Coordinates: 54°0′34″N 15°27′4″E
- Country: Poland
- Voivodeship: West Pomeranian
- County: Kołobrzeg
- Gmina: Rymań

Mechowo [mɛˈxɔvɔ] (German: Mönchgrund) is a village in the administrative district of Gmina Rymań, within Kołobrzeg County, West Pomeranian Voivodeship, in north-western Poland. It lies approximately 9 km (6 mi) north-west of Rymań, 20 km (12 mi) south-west of Kołobrzeg, and 88 km (55 mi) north-east of the regional capital Szczecin.

== See also ==
- History of Pomerania
