= Lędowa =

- Settlement
- Location within Poland
- Coordinates: 53°58′8″N 15°31′45″E
- Country: Poland
- Voivodeship: West Pomeranian
- County: Kołobrzeg
- Gmina: Rymań

Lędowa [lɛnˈdɔva] (German: Waldhof) is a settlement in the administrative district of Gmina Rymań, within Kołobrzeg County, West Pomeranian Voivodeship, in north-western Poland. It lies approximately 3 km (2 mi) north of Rymań, 23 km (14 mi) south of Kołobrzeg, and 88 km (55 mi) north-east of the regional capital Szczecin.

== See also ==
- History of Pomerania
