= Kędrzyno =

- Village
- Location within Poland
- Coordinates: 54°3′59″N 15°27′11″E
- Country: Poland
- Voivodeship: West Pomeranian
- County: Kołobrzeg
- Gmina: Siemyśl

Kędrzyno [kɛnˈdʐɨnɔ] (German: Gandelin) is a village in the administrative district of Gmina Siemyśl, within Kołobrzeg County, West Pomeranian Voivodeship, in north-western Poland. It lies approximately 7 km (4 mi) north-west of Siemyśl, 14 km (9 mi) south-west of Kołobrzeg, and 93 km (58 mi) north-east of the regional capital Szczecin.

For the history of the region, see History of Pomerania.
