= Nieżyn, West Pomeranian Voivodeship =

Village in West Pomeranian Voivodeship, Poland

Nieżyn
- Village
- Location within Poland
- Coordinates: 54°3′23″N 15°32′54″E
- Country: Poland
- Voivodeship: West Pomeranian
- County: Kołobrzeg
- Gmina: Siemyśl

Nieżyn [ˈɲɛʐɨn] (German: Nessin) is a village in the administrative district of Gmina Siemyśl, within Kołobrzeg County, West Pomeranian Voivodeship, in north-western Poland. It lies approximately 4 km (2 mi) north of Siemyśl, 13 km (8 mi) south of Kołobrzeg, and 96 km (60 mi) north-east of the regional capital Szczecin.
