= Skrzydłowo, West Pomeranian Voivodeship =

Skrzydłowo
- Village
- Location within Poland
- Coordinates: 53°55′20″N 15°28′15″E
- Country: Poland
- Voivodeship: West Pomeranian
- County: Kołobrzeg
- Gmina: Rymań
- Population: 140

Skrzydłowo [skʂɨˈdwɔvɔ] (German: Mühlenbruch) is a village in the administrative district of Gmina Rymań, within Kołobrzeg County, West Pomeranian Voivodeship, in north-western Poland. It lies approximately 5 km (3 mi) south-west of Rymań, 28 km (17 mi) south of Kołobrzeg, and 82 km (51 mi) north-east of the regional capital Szczecin.

The village has a population of 140.

== See also ==
- History of Pomerania
