= Gorawino =

- Village
- Location within Poland
- Coordinates: 53°59′48″N 15°29′34″E
- Country: Poland
- Voivodeship: West Pomeranian
- County: Kołobrzeg
- Gmina: Rymań
- Population: 720

Gorawino [ɡɔraˈvinɔ] (German: Gervin) is a village in the administrative district of Gmina Rymań, within Kołobrzeg County, West Pomeranian Voivodeship, in north-western Poland. It lies approximately 7 km (4 mi) north-west of Rymań, 20 km (12 mi) south of Kołobrzeg, and 88 km (55 mi) north-east of the regional capital Szczecin.

The village has a population of 720.

== See also ==
- History of Pomerania
