= Jaromierzyce =

- Settlement
- Location within Poland
- Coordinates: 54°11′7″N 15°46′27″E
- Country: Poland
- Voivodeship: West Pomeranian
- County: Kołobrzeg
- Gmina: Ustronie Morskie

Jaromierzyce [jarɔmjɛˈʐɨt͡sɛ] (German: Bocksberg) is a settlement in the administrative district of Gmina Ustronie Morskie, within Kołobrzeg County, West Pomeranian Voivodeship, in north-western Poland. It lies approximately 4 km (2 mi) south of Ustronie Morskie, 14 km (9 mi) east of Kołobrzeg, and 116 km (72 mi) north-east of the regional capital Szczecin.
