= Kamień Rymański =

- Village
- Location within Poland
- Coordinates: 53°55′17″N 15°31′54″E
- Country: Poland
- Voivodeship: West Pomeranian
- County: Kołobrzeg
- Gmina: Rymań
- Population: 50

Kamień Rymański (Polish pronunciation: [ˈkamjɛj̃ rɨˈmaj̃skʲi]; German: Hohenfier) is a village in the administrative district of Gmina Rymań, within Kołobrzeg County, West Pomeranian Voivodeship, in north-western Poland. It lies approximately 3 km (2 mi) south of Rymań, 28 km (17 mi) south of Kołobrzeg, and 84 km (52 mi) north-east of the regional capital Szczecin.

The village has a population of 50.

== See also ==
- History of Pomerania
