= Płonino =

- Village
- Location within Poland
- Coordinates: 53°56′24″N 15°29′58″E
- Country: Poland
- Voivodeship: West Pomeranian
- County: Kołobrzeg
- Gmina: Rymań

Płonino [pwɔˈninɔ] (German: Karlshagen) is a village in the administrative district of Gmina Rymań, within Kołobrzeg County, West Pomeranian Voivodeship, in north-western Poland. It lies approximately 3 km (2 mi) west of Rymań, 26 km (16 mi) south of Kołobrzeg, and 84 km (52 mi) north-east of the regional capital Szczecin.

== See also ==
- History of Pomerania
