= Drozdowo, Kołobrzeg County =

Drozdowo
- Village
- Location within Poland
- Coordinates: 53°59′37″N 15°32′50″E
- Country: Poland
- Voivodeship: West Pomeranian
- County: Kołobrzeg
- Gmina: Rymań
- Population: 551

Drozdowo [drɔzˈdɔvɔ] (German: Drosedow) is a village in the administrative district of Gmina Rymań, within Kołobrzeg County, West Pomeranian Voivodeship, in north-western Poland. It lies approximately 6 km (4 mi) north of Rymań, 20 km (12 mi) south of Kołobrzeg, and 91 km (57 mi) north-east of the regional capital Szczecin.

The village has a population of 551.

== See also ==
- History of Pomerania
