= Grąbnica =

- Village
- Location within Poland
- Coordinates: 54°12′48″N 15°46′27″E
- Country: Poland
- Voivodeship: West Pomeranian
- County: Kołobrzeg
- Gmina: Ustronie Morskie

Grąbnica [ɡrɔmbˈnit͡sa] (German: Hundeberg) is a village in the administrative district of Gmina Ustronie Morskie, within Kołobrzeg County, West Pomeranian Voivodeship, in north-western Poland. It lies approximately 2 km (1 mi) east of Ustronie Morskie, 15 km (9 mi) east of Kołobrzeg, and 119 km (74 mi) north-east of the regional capital Szczecin.
