= Gwizd =

- Village
- Location within Poland
- Coordinates: 54°12′14″N 15°46′44″E
- Country: Poland
- Voivodeship: West Pomeranian
- County: Kołobrzeg
- Gmina: Ustronie Morskie

Gwizd [ɡvist] (German: Quid) is a village in the administrative district of Gmina Ustronie Morskie, within Kołobrzeg County, West Pomeranian Voivodeship, in north-western Poland. It lies approximately 3 km (2 mi) south-east of Ustronie Morskie, 15 km (9 mi) east of Kołobrzeg, and 118 km (73 mi) north-east of the regional capital Szczecin.
