= Wędzice =

- Settlement
- Location within Poland
- Coordinates: 54°3′12″N 15°27′56″E
- Country: Poland
- Voivodeship: West Pomeranian
- County: Kołobrzeg
- Gmina: Siemyśl

Wędzice [vɛnˈd͡ʑit͡sɛ] (German: Vandüz) is a settlement in the administrative district of Gmina Siemyśl, within Kołobrzeg County, West Pomeranian Voivodeship, in north-western Poland. It lies approximately 6 km (4 mi) north-west of Siemyśl, 15 km (9 mi) south-west of Kołobrzeg, and 92 km (57 mi) north-east of the regional capital Szczecin.
