= Rębice =

- Settlement
- Location within Poland
- Coordinates: 53°58′43″N 15°29′47″E
- Country: Poland
- Voivodeship: West Pomeranian
- County: Kołobrzeg
- Gmina: Rymań

Rębice [rɛmˈbit͡sɛ] (German: Birkhain) is a settlement in the administrative district of Gmina Rymań, within Kołobrzeg County, West Pomeranian Voivodeship, in north-western Poland. It lies approximately 5 km (3 mi) north-west of Rymań, 22 km (14 mi) south of Kołobrzeg, and 87 km (54 mi) north-east of the regional capital Szczecin.

== See also ==
- History of Pomerania
