= Świecie Kołobrzeskie =

- Village
- Location within Poland
- Coordinates: 54°1′51″N 15°27′42″E
- Country: Poland
- Voivodeship: West Pomeranian
- County: Kołobrzeg
- Gmina: Siemyśl

Świecie Kołobrzeskie (Polish: [ˈɕfjɛt͡ɕɛ kɔwɔˈbʐɛskʲɛ]; German: Schwedt) is a village in the administrative district of Gmina Siemyśl, within Kołobrzeg County, West Pomeranian Voivodeship, in north-western Poland. It lies approximately 5 km (3 mi) west of Siemyśl, 17 km (11 mi) south-west of Kołobrzeg, and 90 km (56 mi) north-east of the regional capital Szczecin.
