= Starnin =

- Village
- Location within Poland
- Coordinates: 53°58′5″N 15°27′17″E
- Country: Poland
- Voivodeship: West Pomeranian
- County: Kołobrzeg
- Gmina: Rymań
- Population: 260

Starnin [ˈstarnin] (German: Sternin) is a village in the administrative district of Gmina Rymań, within Kołobrzeg County, West Pomeranian Voivodeship, in north-western Poland. It lies approximately 6 km (4 mi) north-west of Rymań, 24 km (15 mi) south of Kołobrzeg, and 84 km (52 mi) north-east of the regional capital Szczecin.

The village has a population of 260.

== See also ==
- History of Pomerania
