= Starża, West Pomeranian Voivodeship =

Starża
- Village
- Location within Poland
- Coordinates: 53°56′36″N 15°34′2″E
- Country: Poland
- Voivodeship: West Pomeranian
- County: Kołobrzeg
- Gmina: Rymań
- Population: 10

Starża [ˈstarʐa] (German: Starsberg) is a village in the administrative district of Gmina Rymań, within Kołobrzeg County, West Pomeranian Voivodeship, in north-western Poland. It lies approximately 3 km (2 mi) east of Rymań, 25 km (16 mi) south of Kołobrzeg, and 88 km (55 mi) north-east of the regional capital Szczecin.

For the history of the region, see History of Pomerania.

The village has a population of 10.
