= Paprocie, West Pomeranian Voivodeship =

Paprocie
- Village
- Location within Poland
- Coordinates: 54°4′40″N 15°28′51″E
- Country: Poland
- Voivodeship: West Pomeranian
- County: Kołobrzeg
- Gmina: Siemyśl

Paprocie [paˈprɔt͡ɕɛ] (German: Elisenhof) is a village in the administrative district of Gmina Siemyśl, within Kołobrzeg County, West Pomeranian Voivodeship, in north-western Poland. It lies approximately 7 km (4 mi) north-west of Siemyśl, 12 km (7 mi) south-west of Kołobrzeg, and 95 km (59 mi) north-east of the regional capital Szczecin.
