= Kinowo =

- Village
- Location within Poland
- Coordinates: 53°58′46″N 15°26′22″E
- Country: Poland
- Voivodeship: West Pomeranian
- County: Kołobrzeg
- Gmina: Rymań
- Population: 120

Kinowo [kiˈnɔvɔ] (German: Kienow) is a village in the administrative district of Gmina Rymań, within Kołobrzeg County, West Pomeranian Voivodeship, in north-western Poland. It lies approximately 8 km (5 mi) north-west of Rymań, 23 km (14 mi) south of Kołobrzeg, and 85 km (53 mi) north-east of the regional capital Szczecin.

The village has a population of 120.

== See also ==
- History of Pomerania
