= Byszewo, Kołobrzeg County =

Byszewo
- Village
- Location within Poland
- Coordinates: 54°3′42″N 15°29′19″E
- Country: Poland
- Voivodeship: West Pomeranian
- County: Kołobrzeg
- Gmina: Siemyśl

Byszewo [bɨˈʂɛvɔ] (German: Büssow) is a village in the administrative district of Gmina Siemyśl, within Kołobrzeg County, West Pomeranian Voivodeship, in north-western Poland. It lies approximately 5 km (3 mi) north-west of Siemyśl, 13 km (8 mi) south-west of Kołobrzeg, and 94 km (58 mi) north-east of the regional capital Szczecin.

For the history of the region, see History of Pomerania.
