= Bukowo, Kołobrzeg County =

Bukowo
- Village
- Location within Poland
- Coordinates: 53°55′32″N 15°32′33″E
- Country: Poland
- Voivodeship: West Pomeranian
- County: Kołobrzeg
- Gmina: Rymań

Bukowo [buˈkɔvɔ] (German: Buchwald) is a village in the administrative district of Gmina Rymań, within Kołobrzeg County, West Pomeranian Voivodeship, in north-western Poland. It lies approximately 3 km (2 mi) south of Rymań, 27 km (17 mi) south of Kołobrzeg, and 85 km (53 mi) north-east of the regional capital Szczecin.

== See also ==
- History of Pomerania
