= Małobór, Kołobrzeg County =

Małobór
- Settlement
- Location within Poland
- Coordinates: 53°57′39″N 15°30′27″E
- Country: Poland
- Voivodeship: West Pomeranian
- County: Kołobrzeg
- Gmina: Rymań

Małobór [maˈwɔbur] (German: Waldhaus) is a settlement in the administrative district of Gmina Rymań, within Kołobrzeg County, West Pomeranian Voivodeship, in north-western Poland. It lies approximately 3 km (2 mi) north-west of Rymań, 24 km (15 mi) south of Kołobrzeg, and 86 km (53 mi) north-east of the regional capital Szczecin.

== See also ==
- History of Pomerania
