= Czartkowo =

- Settlement
- Location within Poland
- Coordinates: 53°55′42″N 15°28′27″E
- Country: Poland
- Voivodeship: West Pomeranian
- County: Kołobrzeg
- Gmina: Rymań

Czartkowo [t͡ʂartˈkɔvɔ] (German: Brückenkrug) is a settlement in the administrative district of Gmina Rymań, within Kołobrzeg County, West Pomeranian Voivodeship, in north-western Poland. It lies approximately 5 km (3 mi) south-west of Rymań, 28 km (17 mi) south of Kołobrzeg, and 82 km (51 mi) north-east of the regional capital Szczecin.

== See also ==
- History of Pomerania.
