= Petrykozy, West Pomeranian Voivodeship =

Petrykozy
- Village
- Location within Poland
- Coordinates: 54°1′22″N 15°26′59″E
- Country: Poland
- Voivodeship: West Pomeranian
- County: Kołobrzeg
- Gmina: Rymań
- Population: 120

Petrykozy [pɛtrɨˈkɔzɨ] (German: Althof) is a village in the administrative district of Gmina Rymań, within Kołobrzeg County, West Pomeranian Voivodeship, in north-western Poland. It lies approximately 11 km (7 mi) north-west of Rymań, 18 km (11 mi) south-west of Kołobrzeg, and 89 km (55 mi) north-east of the regional capital Szczecin.

The village has a population of 120.

== See also ==
- History of Pomerania
