= Kukinia =

- Village
- Location within Poland
- Coordinates: 54°10′2″N 15°45′37″E
- Country: Poland
- Voivodeship: West Pomeranian
- County: Kołobrzeg
- Gmina: Ustronie Morskie
- Population: 240

Kukinia [kuˈkiɲa] (German: Alt Quetzin) is a village in the administrative district of Gmina Ustronie Morskie, within Kołobrzeg County, West Pomeranian Voivodeship, in north-western Poland. It lies approximately 6 km (4 mi) south of Ustronie Morskie, 13 km (8 mi) east of Kołobrzeg, and 114 km (71 mi) north-east of the regional capital Szczecin.

The village has a population of 240.
