= Białokury =

- Village
- Location within Poland
- Coordinates: 54°0′55″N 15°30′57″E
- Country: Poland
- Voivodeship: West Pomeranian
- County: Kołobrzeg
- Gmina: Siemyśl

Białokury [bjawɔˈkurɨ] (German: Baldekow) is a village in the administrative district of Gmina Siemyśl, within Kołobrzeg County, West Pomeranian Voivodeship, in north-western Poland. It lies approximately 2 km (1 mi) south-west of Siemyśl, 18 km (11 mi) south of Kołobrzeg, and 91 km (57 mi) north-east of the regional capital Szczecin.

For the history of the region, see History of Pomerania.
