= Drozdówko, Kołobrzeg County =

Drozdówko
- Village
- Location within Poland
- Coordinates: 53°59′0″N 15°31′3″E
- Country: Poland
- Voivodeship: West Pomeranian
- County: Kołobrzeg
- Gmina: Rymań
- Population: 70

Drozdówko [drɔzˈdufkɔ] (German: Vorwerk Drosedow) is a village in the administrative district of Gmina Rymań, within Kołobrzeg County, West Pomeranian Voivodeship, in north-western Poland. It lies approximately 5 km (3 mi) north of Rymań, 21 km (13 mi) south of Kołobrzeg, and 88 km (55 mi) north-east of the regional capital Szczecin.

The village has a population of 70.

== See also ==
- History of Pomerania
