= Wszemierzyce =

- Village
- Location within Poland
- Coordinates: 54°1′29″N 15°35′36″E
- Country: Poland
- Voivodeship: West Pomeranian
- County: Kołobrzeg
- Gmina: Siemyśl

Wszemierzyce [fʂɛmjɛˈʐɨt͡sɛ] (German: Marienhof) is a village in the administrative district of Gmina Siemyśl, within Kołobrzeg County, West Pomeranian Voivodeship, in north-western Poland. It lies approximately 5 km (3 mi) east of Siemyśl, 16 km (10 mi) south of Kołobrzeg, and 95 km (59 mi) north-east of the regional capital Szczecin.
