= Bębnikąt, Kołobrzeg County =

Bębnikąt
- Settlement
- Location within Poland
- Coordinates: 53°57′15″N 15°26′54″E
- Country: Poland
- Voivodeship: West Pomeranian
- County: Kołobrzeg
- Gmina: Rymań

Bębnikąt [bɛmbˈnikɔnt] (German: Kölpiner Mühle) is a settlement in the administrative district of Gmina Rymań, within Kołobrzeg County, West Pomeranian Voivodeship, in north-western Poland. It lies approximately 6 km (4 mi) west of Rymań, 25 km (16 mi) south of Kołobrzeg, and 83 km (52 mi) north-east of the regional capital Szczecin.

== See also ==
- History of Pomerania
