= Leszczyn-Kolonia =

- Village
- Location within Poland
- Coordinates: 53°56′52″N 15°34′44″E
- Country: Poland
- Voivodeship: West Pomeranian
- County: Kołobrzeg
- Gmina: Rymań

Leszczyn-Kolonia [ˈlɛʂt͡ʂɨn kɔˈlɔɲa] (German: Kolonie Lestin) is a village in the administrative district of Gmina Rymań, within Kołobrzeg County, West Pomeranian Voivodeship, in north-western Poland. It lies approximately 4 km (2 mi) east of Rymań, 25 km (16 mi) south of Kołobrzeg, and 89 km (55 mi) north-east of the regional capital Szczecin.

== See also ==
- History of Pomerania
