= Kukinka =

- Village
- Location within Poland
- Coordinates: 54°11′16″N 15°45′8″E
- Country: Poland
- Voivodeship: West Pomeranian
- County: Kołobrzeg
- Gmina: Ustronie Morskie

Kukinka [kuˈkinka] (German: Neu Quetzin) is a village in the administrative district of Gmina Ustronie Morskie, within Kołobrzeg County, West Pomeranian Voivodeship, in north-western Poland. It lies approximately 4 km (2 mi) south of Ustronie Morskie, 13 km (8 mi) east of Kołobrzeg, and 115 km (71 mi) north-east of the regional capital Szczecin.
