= Unieradz =

- Village
- Location within Poland
- Coordinates: 54°3′7″N 15°34′46″E
- Country: Poland
- Voivodeship: West Pomeranian
- County: Kołobrzeg
- Gmina: Siemyśl

Unieradz [uˈɲɛrat͡s] (German: Neurese) is a village in the administrative district of Gmina Siemyśl, within Kołobrzeg County, West Pomeranian Voivodeship, in north-western Poland. It lies approximately 5 km (3 mi) north-east of Siemyśl, 13 km (8 mi) south of Kołobrzeg, and 97 km (60 mi) north-east of the regional capital Szczecin.
