= Izdebno, West Pomeranian Voivodeship =

Izdebno
- Settlement
- Location within Poland
- Coordinates: 54°1′42″N 15°34′55″E
- Country: Poland
- Voivodeship: West Pomeranian
- County: Kołobrzeg
- Gmina: Siemyśl
- Vehicle registration: ZKL

Izdebno [izˈdɛbnɔ] (German: Justinenthal) is a settlement in the administrative district of Gmina Siemyśl, within Kołobrzeg County, West Pomeranian Voivodeship, in north-western Poland. It lies approximately 4 km (2 mi) east of Siemyśl, 16 km (10 mi) south of Kołobrzeg, and 95 km (59 mi) north-east of the regional capital Szczecin.
