= Niemierze =

- Village
- Location within Poland
- Coordinates: 54°5′18″N 15°31′26″E
- Country: Poland
- Voivodeship: West Pomeranian
- County: Kołobrzeg
- Gmina: Siemyśl

Niemierze [ɲɛˈmjɛʐɛ] (German: Nehmer) is a village in the administrative district of Gmina Siemyśl, within Kołobrzeg County, West Pomeranian Voivodeship, in north-western Poland. It lies approximately 7 km (4 mi) north of Siemyśl, 10 km (6 mi) south of Kołobrzeg, and 97 km (60 mi) north-east of the regional capital Szczecin.

The locale's designation derives from the Slavic given name Niemir.
