= Mącznik, West Pomeranian Voivodeship =

Mącznik
- Village
- Location within Poland
- Coordinates: 54°3′39″N 15°33′21″E
- Country: Poland
- Voivodeship: West Pomeranian
- County: Kołobrzeg
- Gmina: Siemyśl

Mącznik [ˈmɔnt͡ʂnik] (German: Alte Mühle) is a village in the administrative district of Gmina Siemyśl, within Kołobrzeg County, West Pomeranian Voivodeship, in north-western Poland. It lies approximately 4 km (2 mi) north-east of Siemyśl, 12 km (7 mi) south of Kołobrzeg, and 96 km (60 mi) north-east of the regional capital Szczecin.

For the history of the region, see History of Pomerania.
