= Zieleniewo =

Zieleniewo may refer to the following places:

- Zieleniewo, Kuyavian-Pomeranian Voivodeship (north-central Poland)
- Zieleniewo, Choszczno County in West Pomeranian Voivodeship (north-west Poland)
- Zieleniewo, Kołobrzeg County in West Pomeranian Voivodeship (north-west Poland)
- Zieleniewo, Koszalin County in West Pomeranian Voivodeship (north-west Poland)
- Zieleniewo, Stargard County in West Pomeranian Voivodeship (north-west Poland)
