= Budzimskie =

- Settlement
- Location within Poland
- Coordinates: 54°05′26″N 15°28′55″E
- Country: Poland
- Voivodeship: West Pomeranian
- County: Kołobrzeg
- Gmina: Kołobrzeg

Budzimskie [buˈd͡ʑimskʲɛ] (German: Baselerskaten) is a settlement in the administrative district of Gmina Kołobrzeg, within Kołobrzeg County, West Pomeranian Voivodeship, in north-western Poland.

For the history of the region, see History of Pomerania.
