= Jaglino =

- Settlement
- Location within Poland
- Coordinates: 53°55′38″N 15°28′41″E
- Country: Poland
- Voivodeship: West Pomeranian
- County: Kołobrzeg
- Gmina: Rymań

Jaglino [jaˈɡlinɔ] (German: Jäglin) is a settlement in the administrative district of Gmina Rymań, within Kołobrzeg County, West Pomeranian Voivodeship, in north-western Poland.

== See also ==
- History of Pomerania
