= Kądzielno =

- Village
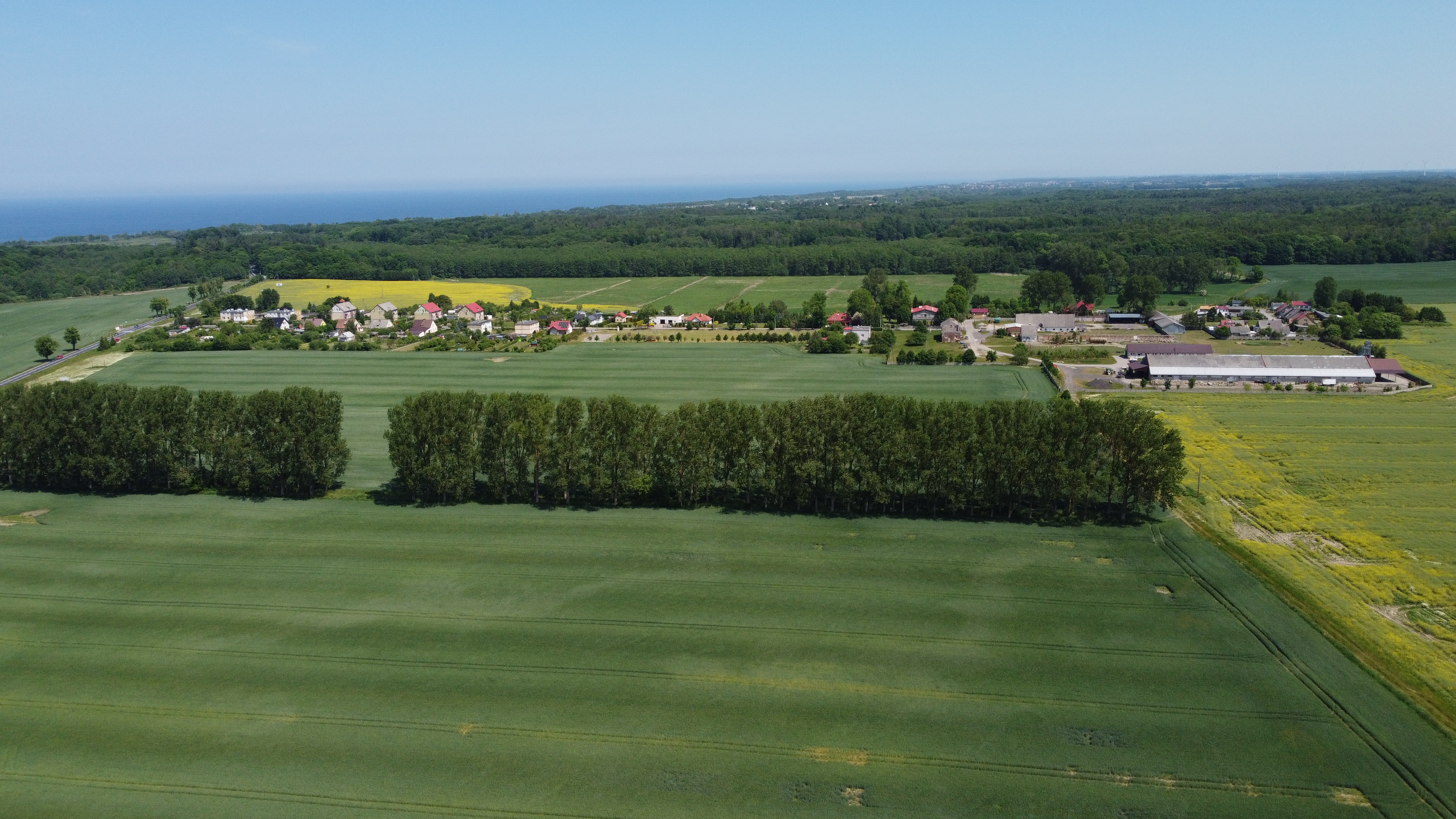

- Location within Poland
- Coordinates: 54°10′40″N 15°38′16″E
- Country: Poland
- Voivodeship: West Pomeranian
- County: Kołobrzeg
- Gmina: Kołobrzeg
- Population: 350
- Time zone: UTC+1 (CET)
  - Summer (DST): UTC+2 (CEST)
- Vehicle registration: ZKL

Kądzielno [kɔnˈd͡ʑɛlnɔ] (German : Heinrichshof) is a village in the administrative district of Gmina Kołobrzeg, within Kołobrzeg County, West Pomeranian Voivodeship, in north-western Poland. It lies approximately 5 km (3 mi) east of Kołobrzeg and 110 km (68 mi) north-east of the regional capital Szczecin.

The village has a population of 350.
