= Flag of Kołobrzeg Municipality =

Flag adopted in 2007

Kołobrzeg Municipality
- Proportion: 5:8
- Adopted: 11 January 2007

The flag of the Kołobrzeg Municipality, Kołobrzeg County, located in West Pomeranian Voivodeship, Poland, was adopted in 2007.

== Design ==
The flag of Kołobrzeg Municipality is divided into five fields. The top filed is a red horizontal stripe with the height six time bigger than the other files. All remaining fields consists of four wavy stripes of equal height, whose colours alternate between white and blue colours. In the top red stripe, on the left, is placed a top half of a sun with seven sunshine rays, positioned to look like its bottom half would be hidden behind bottom stripes. The flag is meant to resemble the sun dust on the horizon over the sea. It symbolizes the tourism, fishery and farming industries. The proportions of the flag have aspect ratio of height to width ratio equal 5:8.

== History ==
The flag had been adopted on 11 January 2007.
