= Karcino =

- Village
- Location within Poland
- Coordinates: 54°7′31″N 15°23′34″E
- Country: Poland
- Voivodeship: West Pomeranian
- County: Kołobrzeg
- Gmina: Kołobrzeg

Karcino [karˈt͡ɕinɔ] (German: Langenhagen) is a village in the administrative district of Gmina Kołobrzeg, within Kołobrzeg County, West Pomeranian Voivodeship, in north-western Poland. It lies approximately 13 km (8 mi) west of Kołobrzeg and 95 km (59 mi) north-east of the regional capital Szczecin.

For the history of the region, see History of Pomerania.
