= Drzonowo =

Drzonowo may refer to the following places:

- Drzonowo, Kuyavian-Pomeranian Voivodeship (north-central Poland)
- Drzonowo, Kołobrzeg County in West Pomeranian Voivodeship (north-west Poland)
- Drzonowo, Szczecinek County in West Pomeranian Voivodeship (north-west Poland)
