= Stary Borek =

- Village
- Location within Poland
- Coordinates: 54°7′58″N 15°28′57″E
- Country: Poland
- Voivodeship: West Pomeranian
- County: Kołobrzeg
- Gmina: Kołobrzeg
- Population: 250

Stary Borek [ˈstarɨ ˈbɔrɛk] (German: Altbork) is a village in the administrative district of Gmina Kołobrzeg, within Kołobrzeg County, West Pomeranian Voivodeship, in northwestern Poland. It lies approximately 7 km (4 mi) southwest of Kołobrzeg and 100 km (62 mi) northeast of the regional capital Szczecin. The village has a population of 250.

For the history of the region, see History of Pomerania.
