= Sarbia, West Pomeranian Voivodeship =

Sarbia
- Village
- Location within Poland
- Coordinates: 54°5′40″N 15°25′9″E
- Country: Poland
- Voivodeship: West Pomeranian
- County: Kołobrzeg
- Gmina: Kołobrzeg

Sarbia [ˈsarbja] (German: Zarben) is a village in the administrative district of Gmina Kołobrzeg, within Kołobrzeg County, West Pomeranian Voivodeship, in north-western Poland. It lies approximately 13 km (8 mi) south-west of Kołobrzeg and 94 km (58 mi) north-east of the regional capital Szczecin.

For the history of the region, see History of Pomerania.
