= Rogozina =

Rogozina is the feminine counterpart of the Slavic surname Rogozin. It may also refer to:

== Poland ==
- Rogozina, Gryfice County
- Rogozina, Kołobrzeg County

== Bulgaria ==
- Rogozina, Bulgaria
