= Niekanin =

- Village
- Location within Poland
- Coordinates: 54°9′0″N 15°36′53″E
- Country: Poland
- Voivodeship: West Pomeranian
- County: Kołobrzeg
- Gmina: Kołobrzeg
- Population: 100

Niekanin [ɲɛˈkanin] (German: Necknin) is a village in the administrative district of Gmina Kołobrzeg, within Kołobrzeg County, West Pomeranian Voivodeship, in north-western Poland. It lies approximately 4 km (2 mi) south-east of Kołobrzeg and 106 km (66 mi) north-east of the regional capital Szczecin.

For the history of the region, see History of Pomerania.

The village has a population of about 100.
