= Malechowo, Kołobrzeg County =

Malechowo
- Village
- Location within Poland
- Coordinates: 54°10′36″N 15°44′26″E
- Country: Poland
- Voivodeship: West Pomeranian
- County: Kołobrzeg
- Gmina: Ustronie Morskie

Malechowo [malɛˈxɔvɔ] (German: Malchowbrück) is a village in the administrative district of Gmina Ustronie Morskie, within Kołobrzeg County, West Pomeranian Voivodeship, in north-western Poland. It lies approximately 5 km (3 mi) south of Ustronie Morskie, 12 km (7 mi) east of Kołobrzeg, and 114 km (71 mi) north-east of the regional capital Szczecin.
