= Dębica, Kołobrzeg County =

Dębica
- Village
- Location within Poland
- Coordinates: 53°58′13″N 15°35′32″E
- Country: Poland
- Voivodeship: West Pomeranian
- County: Kołobrzeg
- Gmina: Rymań
- Population: 210

Dębica [dɛmˈbit͡sa] (German: Damitz) is a village in the administrative district of Gmina Rymań, within Kołobrzeg County, West Pomeranian Voivodeship, in north-western Poland. It lies approximately 5 km (3 mi) north-east of Rymań, 22 km (14 mi) south of Kołobrzeg, and 91 km (57 mi) north-east of the regional capital Szczecin.

== See also ==
- History of Pomerania
