= Waddles =

Waddles may refer to:

- Charleszetta Waddles (1912–2001), African-American activist and Pentecostal church minister
- Waddles (Gravity Falls), a recurring character in the animated TV series Gravity Falls
- Waddles Run (Long Run tributary), a river in Ohio County, West Virginia, United States
- Myopathic gait or waddling, a form of gait abnormality
- W4ddles, music producer born in Dnipro, Ukraine

== See also ==
- Waddle (disambiguation)
