= Głąb =

- Settlement
- Location within Poland
- Coordinates: 54°04′36″N 15°25′51″E
- Country: Poland
- Voivodeship: West Pomeranian
- County: Kołobrzeg
- Gmina: Kołobrzeg
- Population: 4

Głąb [ɡwɔmp] (German: Neumühl) is a settlement in the administrative district of Gmina Kołobrzeg, within Kołobrzeg County, West Pomeranian Voivodeship, in north-western Poland.

For the history of the region, see History of Pomerania.
