= Bogucino =

- Village
- Location within Poland
- Coordinates: 54°7′N 15°38′E
- Country: Poland
- Voivodeship: West Pomeranian
- County: Kołobrzeg
- Gmina: Kołobrzeg

Bogucino [bɔɡuˈt͡ɕinɔ] (German: Bogenthin) is a village in the administrative district of Gmina Kołobrzeg, within Kołobrzeg County, West Pomeranian Voivodeship, in north-western Poland. It lies approximately 8 km (5 mi) south-east of Kołobrzeg and 104 km (65 mi) north-east of the regional capital Szczecin.

== See also ==
History of Pomerania
