= Sobiemierz =

- Village
- Location within Poland
- Coordinates: 54°5′15″N 15°27′51″E
- Country: Poland
- Voivodeship: West Pomeranian
- County: Kołobrzeg
- Gmina: Kołobrzeg

Sobiemierz [sɔˈbjɛmjɛʂ] (German: Sophienhof) is a village in the administrative district of Gmina Kołobrzeg, within Kołobrzeg County, West Pomeranian Voivodeship, in north-western Poland.

For the history of the region, see History of Pomerania.
