= Wątłe Błota =

- Settlement
- Location within Poland
- Coordinates: 54°1′51″N 15°33′38″E
- Country: Poland
- Voivodeship: West Pomeranian
- County: Kołobrzeg
- Gmina: Siemyśl

Wątłe Błota [ˈvɔntwɛ ˈbwɔta] (German: Wilhelmsberg) is a settlement in the administrative district of Gmina Siemyśl, within Kołobrzeg County, West Pomeranian Voivodeship, in north-western Poland. It lies approximately 2 km (1 mi) east of Siemyśl, 16 km (10 mi) south of Kołobrzeg, and 94 km (58 mi) north-east of the regional capital Szczecin.
