= Przećmino =

- Village
- Location within Poland
- Coordinates: 54°7′N 15°31′E
- Country: Poland
- Voivodeship: West Pomeranian
- County: Kołobrzeg
- Gmina: Kołobrzeg
- Population: 150

Przećmino [pʂɛt͡ɕˈminɔ] (German: Prettmin) is a village in the administrative district of Gmina Kołobrzeg, within Kołobrzeg County, West Pomeranian Voivodeship, in north-western Poland. It lies approximately 7 km (4 mi) south-west of Kołobrzeg and 100 km (62 mi) north-east of the regional capital Szczecin. The village has a population of 150.

For the history of the region, see History of Pomerania.
