= Nowogardek =

- Village
- Location within Poland
- Coordinates: 54°7′N 15°27′E
- Country: Poland
- Voivodeship: West Pomeranian
- County: Kołobrzeg
- Gmina: Kołobrzeg

Nowogardek [nɔvɔˈɡardɛk] (German: Naugard) is a village in the administrative district of Gmina Kołobrzeg, within Kołobrzeg County, West Pomeranian Voivodeship, in north-western Poland. It lies approximately 10 km (6 mi) south-west of Kołobrzeg and 97 km (60 mi) north-east of the regional capital Szczecin.

For the history of the region, see History of Pomerania.
