= Grzybowo, West Pomeranian Voivodeship =

Grzybowo
- Village
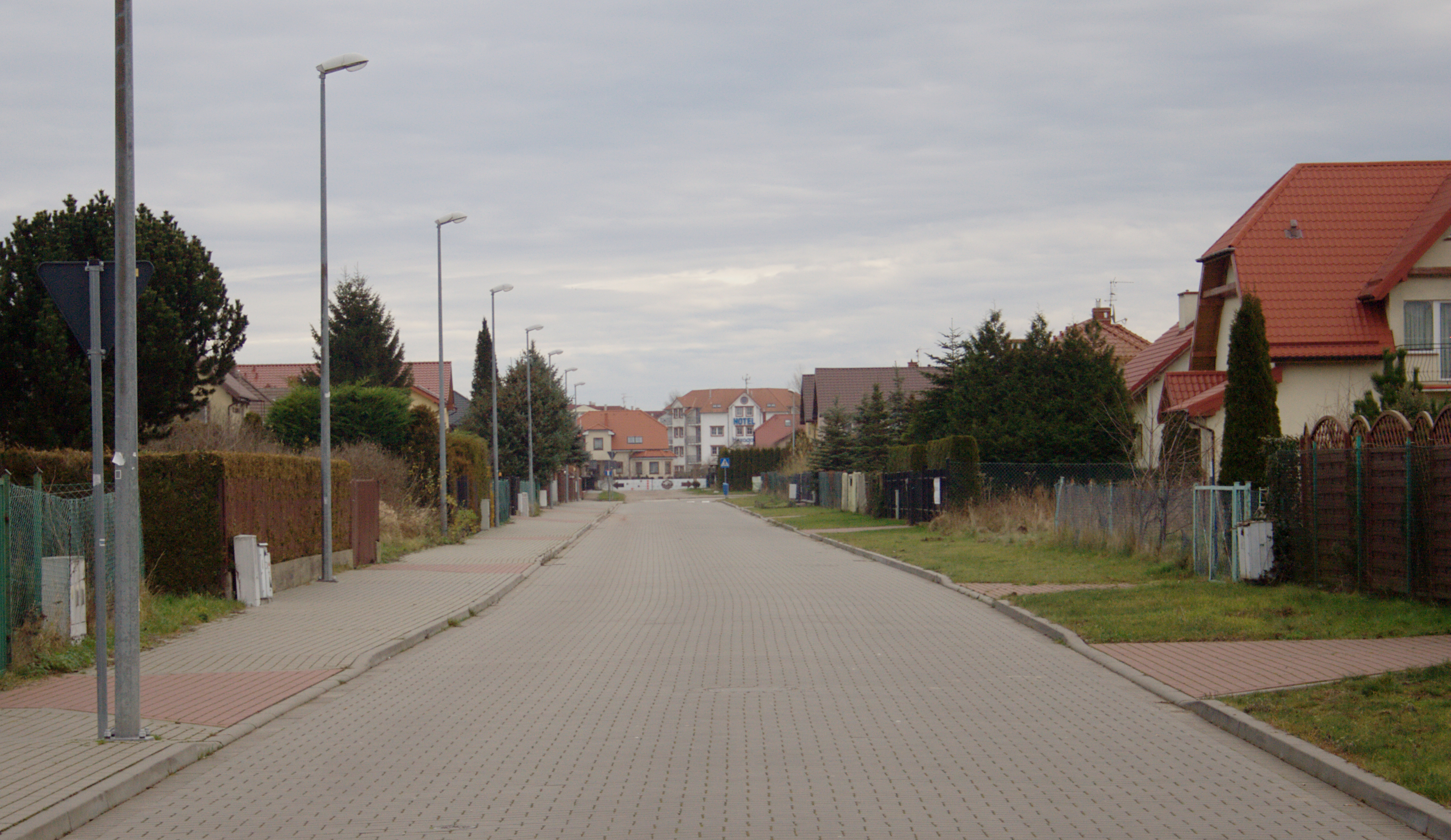

- Location within Poland
- Coordinates: 54°9′N 15°29′E
- Country: Poland
- Voivodeship: West Pomeranian
- County: Kołobrzeg
- Gmina: Kołobrzeg
- Highest elevation: 1.0 m (3.3 ft)
- Lowest elevation: 0.3 m (0.98 ft)
- Population: 1,347
- Time zone: UTC+1 (CET)
  - Summer (DST): UTC+2 (CEST)
- Vehicle registration: ZKL
- Website: http://www.grzybowo.pl/

Grzybowo [ɡʐɨˈbɔvɔ] (German: Gribow) is a village in the administrative district of Gmina Kołobrzeg, within Kołobrzeg County, West Pomeranian Voivodeship, in northwestern Poland. It lies approximately 6 km (4 mi) west of Kołobrzeg and 101 km (63 mi) northeast of the regional capital Szczecin. It is located on the Trzebiatowski Coast.

The village has a population of 1,347.
