= Korzyścienko =

- Settlement
- Location within Poland
- Coordinates: 54°9′27″N 15°31′7″E
- Country: Poland
- Voivodeship: West Pomeranian
- County: Kołobrzeg
- Gmina: Kołobrzeg

Korzyścienko [kɔʐɨɕˈt͡ɕɛnkɔ] (German: Neu Werder) is a settlement in the administrative district of Gmina Kołobrzeg, within Kołobrzeg County, West Pomeranian Voivodeship, in north-western Poland. It lies approximately 4 km (2 mi) west of Kołobrzeg and 103 km (64 mi) north-east of the regional capital Szczecin.

For the history of the region, see History of Pomerania.
