= Przylaski, West Pomeranian Voivodeship =

Przylaski
- Settlement
- Location within Poland
- Coordinates: 54°10′17″N 15°39′22″E
- Country: Poland
- Voivodeship: West Pomeranian
- County: Kołobrzeg
- Gmina: Kołobrzeg
- Population: 0

Przylaski [pʂɨˈlaski] is a former settlement in the administrative district of Gmina Kołobrzeg, within Kołobrzeg County, West Pomeranian Voivodeship, in north-western Poland.

For the history of the region, see History of Pomerania.
