= Morowo =

- Village
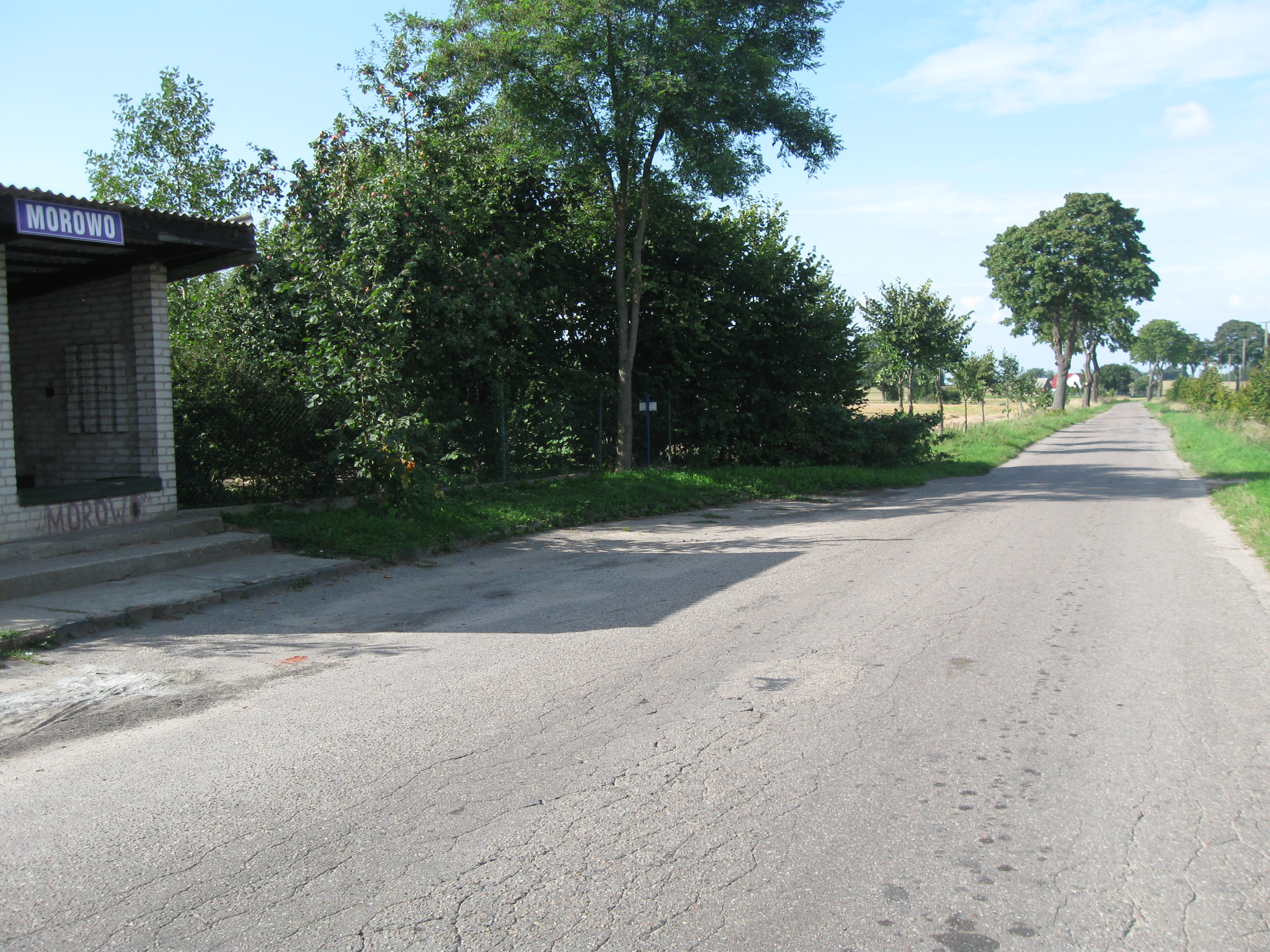
- Road in Morowo

- Location within Poland
- Coordinates: 54°02′34″N 15°28′51″E
- Country: Poland
- Voivodeship: West Pomeranian
- County: Kołobrzeg
- Gmina: Siemyśl

Morowo [mɔˈrɔvɔ] (German: Mohrow) is a village in the administrative district of Gmina Siemyśl, within Kołobrzeg County, West Pomeranian Voivodeship, in north-western Poland.

For the history of the region, see History of Pomerania.
