= Sianożęty =

- Village
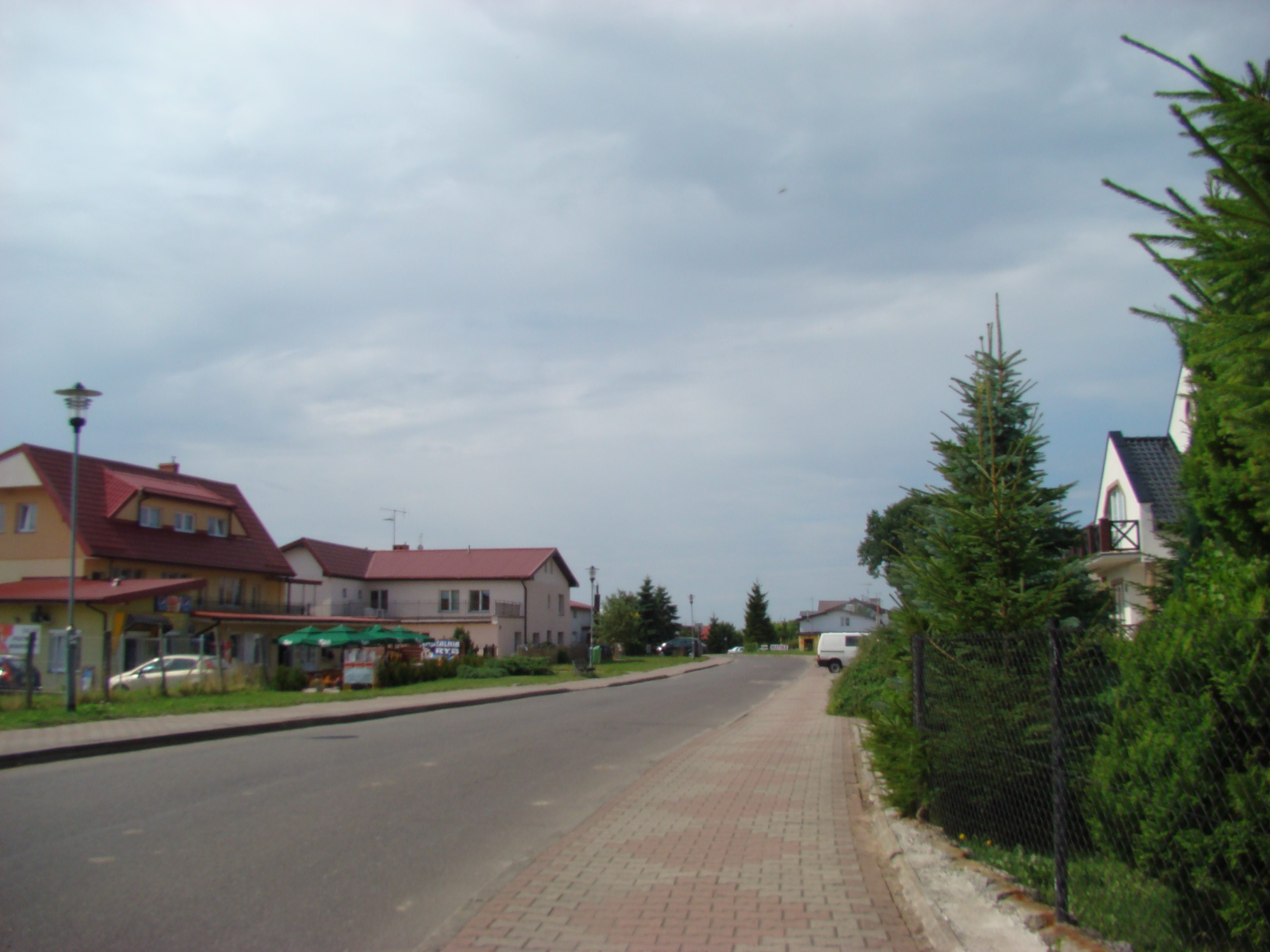
- Road through the village

- Location within Poland
- Coordinates: 54°12′30″N 15°43′33″E
- Country: Poland
- Voivodeship: West Pomeranian
- County: Kołobrzeg
- Gmina: Ustronie Morskie
- Population: 280

Sianożęty [ɕanɔˈʐɛntɨ] (German: Ziegenberg) is a village in the administrative district of Gmina Ustronie Morskie, within Kołobrzeg County, West Pomeranian Voivodeship, in north-western Poland.

The village has a population of 280.

It is also a popular summer destination due to its coastal location featuring sandy beaches and a sea-side promenade.
