= Korzystno =

- Village
- Location within Poland
- Coordinates: 54°8′42″N 15°31′4″E
- Country: Poland
- Voivodeship: West Pomeranian
- County: Kołobrzeg
- Gmina: Kołobrzeg

Korzystno [kɔˈʐɨstnɔ] (German: Alt Werder) is a village in the administrative district of Gmina Kołobrzeg, within Kołobrzeg County, West Pomeranian Voivodeship, in north-western Poland. It lies approximately 4 km (2 mi) south-west of Kołobrzeg and 102 km (63 mi) north-east of the regional capital Szczecin.

For the history of the region, see History of Pomerania.
