= Bezpraw =

- Settlement
- Location within Poland
- Coordinates: 54°07′07″N 15°32′11″E
- Country: Poland
- Voivodeship: West Pomeranian
- County: Kołobrzeg
- Gmina: Kołobrzeg
- Population: 1

Bezpraw [ˈbɛspraf] (German: Kautzenberg) is a settlement in the administrative district of Gmina Kołobrzeg, within Kołobrzeg County, West Pomeranian Voivodeship, in north-western Poland. For the history of the region, see History of Pomerania.
