= Stramnica =

Village in Poland

- Village
- Location within Poland
- Coordinates: 54°9′15″N 15°38′23″E
- Country: Poland
- Voivodeship: West Pomeranian
- County: Kołobrzeg
- Gmina: Kołobrzeg
- Population: 210

Stramnica [stramˈnit͡sa] (German: Alt Tramm) is a village in the administrative district of Gmina Kołobrzeg, within Kołobrzeg County, West Pomeranian Voivodeship, in north-western Poland. It lies approximately 5 km (3 mi) east of Kołobrzeg and 108 km (67 mi) north-east of the regional capital Szczecin.

For the history of the region, see History of Pomerania.

The village has a population of 210.

== Buildings and structures ==
At Stramnica, there is at 54°08′55.05″N 15°38′13.24″E a 106 metres tall lattice tower operated by Rstv and used for FM-/TV-broadcasting . Close to this tower, there is at 54°08′55.06″N 15°38′17.16″E a second smaller telecommunication tower, which is also a lattice tower and approximately 83 metres tall.
