= Gołkowo, West Pomeranian Voivodeship =

Gołkowo
- Settlement
- Location within Poland
- Coordinates: 53°57′33″N 15°31′32″E
- Country: Poland
- Voivodeship: West Pomeranian
- County: Kołobrzeg
- Gmina: Rymań

Gołkowo [ɡɔu̯ˈkɔvɔ] (German: Birkenfelde) is a settlement in the administrative district of Gmina Rymań, within Kołobrzeg County, West Pomeranian Voivodeship, in north-western Poland.

== See also ==
- History of Pomerania
