= Grabowo, Kołobrzeg County =

Grabowo
- Settlement
- Location within Poland
- Coordinates: 54°05′41″N 15°31′40″E
- Country: Poland
- Voivodeship: West Pomeranian
- County: Kołobrzeg
- Gmina: Siemyśl

Grabowo [ɡraˈbɔvɔ] (formerly German: Stubbenberg) is a settlement in the administrative district of Gmina Siemyśl, within Kołobrzeg County, West Pomeranian Voivodeship, in north-western Poland.

For the history of the region, see History of Pomerania.
