= Nowy Borek, West Pomeranian Voivodeship =

Nowy Borek
- Village
- Location within Poland
- Coordinates: 54°7′45″N 15°28′15″E
- Country: Poland
- Voivodeship: West Pomeranian
- County: Kołobrzeg
- Gmina: Kołobrzeg
- Population: 60

Nowy Borek [ˈnɔvɨ ˈbɔrɛk] (German: Neubork) is a village in the administrative district of Gmina Kołobrzeg, within Kołobrzeg County, West Pomeranian Voivodeship, in north-western Poland. It lies approximately 8 km (5 mi) south-west of Kołobrzeg and 99 km (62 mi) north-east of the regional capital Szczecin. The village has a population of 60.

For the history of the region, see History of Pomerania.
