= Bogusławiec =

- Village
- Location within Poland
- Coordinates: 54°5′19″N 15°28′4″E
- Country: Poland
- Voivodeship: West Pomeranian
- County: Kołobrzeg
- Gmina: Kołobrzeg

Bogusławiec [bɔɡuˈswavjɛt͡s] (German: Charlottenhof) is a village in the administrative district of Gmina Kołobrzeg, within Kołobrzeg County, West Pomeranian Voivodeship, in north-western Poland. It lies approximately 11 km (7 mi) south-west of Kołobrzeg and 95 km (59 mi) north-east of the regional capital Szczecin.
