= Malechowo =

Malechowo may refer to the following places:

- Malechowo, Kołobrzeg County in West Pomeranian Voivodeship (north-west Poland)
- Malechowo, Sławno County in West Pomeranian Voivodeship (north-west Poland)
- Malechowo, Szczecinek County in West Pomeranian Voivodeship (north-west Poland)
