= Rzesznikówko =

- Settlement
- Location within Poland
- Coordinates: 53°56′14″N 15°28′23″E
- Country: Poland
- Voivodeship: West Pomeranian
- County: Kołobrzeg
- Gmina: Rymań

Rzesznikówko [ʐɛʂniˈkufkɔ] (German: Neu Reselkow) is a settlement in the administrative district of Gmina Rymań, within Kołobrzeg County, West Pomeranian Voivodeship, in north-western Poland.

This residential area was first created in the mid-19th century when farms were being laid out northwest of the village of Reselkow.

== See also ==
- History of Pomerania
