= Dębica (disambiguation) =

Dębica is a town in south-eastern Poland.

Dębica may also refer to:

- Dębica, Lublin Voivodeship (east Poland)
- Dębica, Kołobrzeg County in West Pomeranian Voivodeship (north-west Poland)
- Dębica, Pyrzyce County in West Pomeranian Voivodeship (north-west Poland)
- Dębica Tires, the Polish division of Goodyear Tire and Rubber Company
