= Watle =

Watle is a surname. Notable people with the surname include:

- Per Arne Watle (born 1948), Norwegian businessperson and politician
- Sarita Watle (died after 1944), Spanish dancer, vedette, singer, and actor

== See also ==
- Wątłe Błota, Poland
