= Gmina Ustronie Morskie =

Gmina Ustronie Morskie Ustronie Morskie Commune
- Gmina
- Flag Coat of arms
- Interactive map of Gmina Ustronie Morskie
- Coordinates (Ustronie Morskie): 54°12′55″N 15°45′17″E
- Country: Poland
- Voivodeship: West Pomeranian
- County: Kołobrzeg
- Seat: Ustronie Morskie

Area
  - Total: 57.27 km^{2} (22.11 sq mi)

Population (2006)
  - Total: 3,613
  - Density: 63.09/km^{2} (163.4/sq mi)
- Website: http://www.ustronie-morskie.pl/

Gmina Ustronie Morskie is a rural gmina (administrative district) in Kołobrzeg County, West Pomeranian Voivodeship, in north-western Poland. Its seat is the village of Ustronie Morskie, which lies approximately 14 kilometres (9 mi) north-east of Kołobrzeg and 118 km (73 mi) north-east of the regional capital Szczecin.

The gmina covers an area of 57.27 square kilometres (22.1 sq mi), and as of 2006 its total population is 3,613.

== Villages ==
Gmina Ustronie Morskie contains the villages and settlements of Bagicz, Grąbnica, Gwizd, Jaromierzyce, Kukinia, Kukinka, Malechowo, Olszyna, Rusowo, Sianożęty, Ustronie Morskie and Wieniotowo.

== Neighbouring gminas ==
Gmina Ustronie Morskie is bordered by the gminas of Będzino, Dygowo and Kołobrzeg.
