= Rogozina, Kołobrzeg County =

Rogozina
- Settlement
- Location within Poland
- Coordinates: 54°07′36″N 15°23′40″E
- Country: Poland
- Voivodeship: West Pomeranian
- County: Kołobrzeg
- Gmina: Kołobrzeg

Rogozina [rɔɡɔˈʑina] is a settlement in the administrative district of Gmina Kołobrzeg, within Kołobrzeg County, West Pomeranian Voivodeship, in north-western Poland.

For the history of the region, see History of Pomerania.
