= Gmina Rymań =

Gmina Rymań Rymań Commune
- Gmina
- Interactive map of Gmina Rymań
- Coordinates (Rymań): 53°56′45″N 15°31′52″E
- Country: Poland
- Voivodeship: West Pomeranian
- County: Kołobrzeg
- Seat: Rymań

Area
  - Total: 146.12 km^{2} (56.42 sq mi)

Population (2006)
  - Total: 4,183
  - Density: 28.63/km^{2} (74.14/sq mi)
- Website: http://www.ryman.pl/

Gmina Rymań is a rural gmina (administrative district) in Kołobrzeg County, West Pomeranian Voivodeship, in north-western Poland. Its seat is the village of Rymań, which lies approximately 25 kilometres (16 mi) south of Kołobrzeg and 86 km (53 mi) north-east of the regional capital Szczecin.

The gmina covers an area of 146.12 square kilometres (56.4 sq mi), and as of 2006 its total population is 4,183.

== Villages ==
Gmina Rymań contains the villages and settlements of Bębnikąt, Bukowo, Czartkowo, Dębica, Drozdówko, Drozdowo, Gołkowo, Gorawino, Jaglino, Jarkowo, Kamień Rymański, Kinowo, Lędowa, Leszczyn, Leszczyn-Kolonia, Małobór, Mechowo, Mirowo, Petrykozy, Płonino, Rębice, Rymań, Rzesznikówko, Rzesznikowo, Skrzydłowo, Starnin, Starża and Strzeblewo.

== Neighbouring gminas ==
Gmina Rymań is bordered by the gminas of Brojce, Gościno, Płoty, Resko, Siemyśl, Sławoborze and Trzebiatów.
