= Waddle (surname) =

Waddle is a surname. Notable people with the surname include:

- Alan Waddle (born 1954), English footballer
- Bryan Waddle (21st century), New Zealand broadcaster
- Chris Waddle (born 1960), English footballer
- Jaylen Waddle (born 1998) American football wide receiver
- Tom Waddle (born 1967), American football wide receiver

== See also ==
- Watle
