= Gmina Kołobrzeg =

Gmina Kołobrzeg Kołobrzeg Commune
- Gmina
- Flag Coat of arms
- Interactive map of Gmina Kołobrzeg
- Coordinates (Kołobrzeg): 54°10′N 15°34′E
- Country: Poland
- Voivodeship: West Pomeranian
- County: Kołobrzeg
- Seat: Kołobrzeg

Area
  - Total: 144.75 km^{2} (55.89 sq mi)

Population (2014)
  - Total: 10,424
  - Density: 72.014/km^{2} (186.51/sq mi)
- Website: http://www.gminakolobrzeg.com.pl/

Gmina Kołobrzeg is a rural gmina (administrative district) in Kołobrzeg County, West Pomeranian Voivodeship, in north-western Poland. Its seat is the town of Kołobrzeg, although the town is not part of the territory of the gmina.

The gmina covers an area of 144.75 square kilometres (55.9 sq mi), and as of 2014 its total population is 10,424.

== Villages ==
Gmina Kołobrzeg contains the villages and settlements of Bezpraw, Błotnica, Bogucino, Bogusławiec, Budzimskie, Budzistowo, Drzonowo, Dźwirzyno, Głąb, Głowaczewo, Grzybowo, Kądzielno, Karcino, Kopydłówko, Korzyścienko, Korzystno, Niekanin, Nowogardek, Nowy Borek, Obroty, Przećmino, Przylaski, Rogozina, Samowo, Sarbia, Sieradowo, Sobiemierz, Stary Borek, Stramnica, Świerszczewo, Wólka and Zieleniewo.

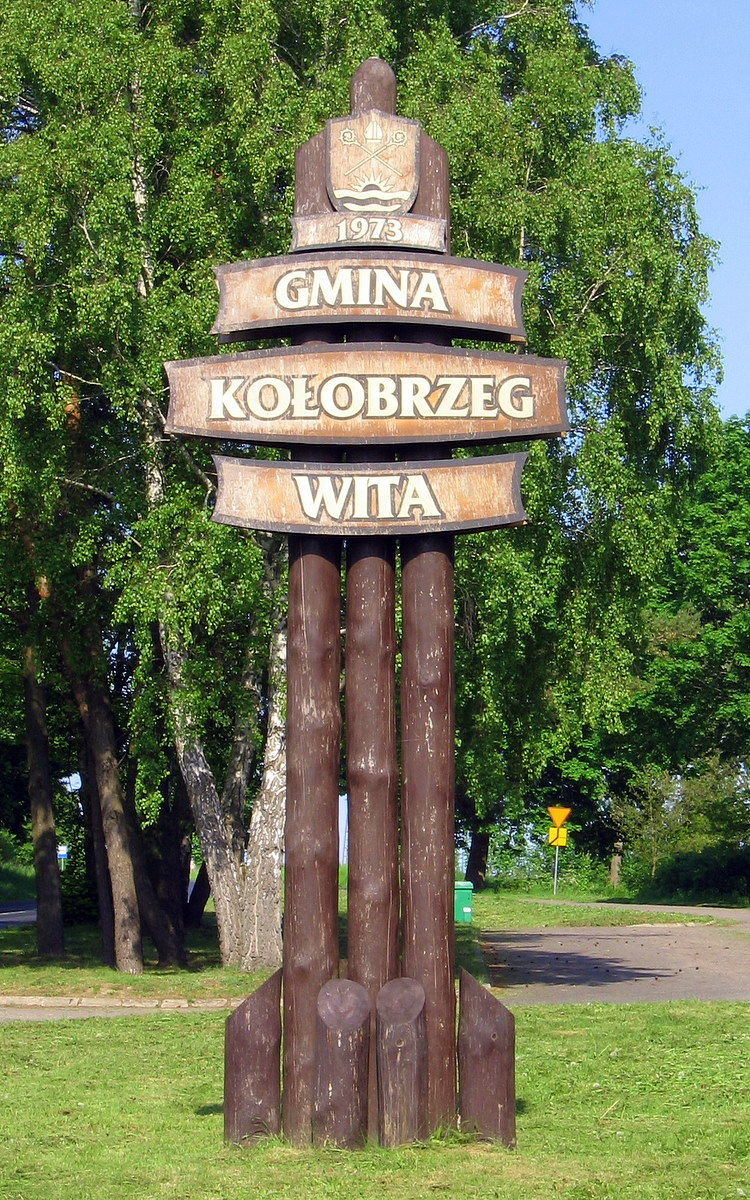
Welcome sign of the Gmina

== Neighbouring gminas ==
Gmina Kołobrzeg is bordered by the town of Kołobrzeg and by the gminas of Dygowo, Gościno, Siemyśl, Trzebiatów and Ustronie Morskie.
