= Gmina Siemyśl =

Gmina Siemyśl Siemyśl Commune
- Gmina
- Gmina Siemyśl (Poland)
- Coordinates (Siemyśl): 54°1′42″N 15°31′55″E
- Country: Poland
- Voivodeship: West Pomeranian
- County: Kołobrzeg
- Seat: Siemyśl

Area
  - Total: 107.44 km^{2} (41.48 sq mi)

Population (2006)
  - Total: 3,582
  - Density: 33.34/km^{2} (86.35/sq mi)
- Website: http://www.siemysl.pl/

Gmina Siemyśl is a rural gmina (administrative district) in Kołobrzeg County, West Pomeranian Voivodeship, in north-western Poland. Its seat is the village of Siemyśl, which lies approximately 16 kilometres (10 mi) south of Kołobrzeg and 93 km (58 mi) north-east of the regional capital Szczecin.

The gmina covers an area of 107.44 square kilometres (41.5 sq mi), and as of 2006 its total population is 3,582.

== Villages ==
Gmina Siemyśl contains the villages and settlements of Białokury, Byszewo, Charzyno, Grabowo, Izdebno, Kędrzyno, Mącznik, Morowo, Niemierze, Nieżyn, Paprocie, Siemyśl, Świecie Kołobrzeskie, Trzynik, Unieradz, Wątłe Błota, Wędzice and Wszemierzyce.

== Neighbouring gminas ==
Gmina Siemyśl is bordered by the gminas of Brojce, Gościno, Kołobrzeg, Rymań and Trzebiatów.
