= Zieleniewo, Kołobrzeg County =

Zieleniewo
- Village
- Location within Poland
- Coordinates: 54°9′N 15°34′E
- Country: Poland
- Voivodeship: West Pomeranian
- County: Kołobrzeg
- Gmina: Kołobrzeg
- Population: 1,100

Zieleniewo [ʑɛlɛˈɲɛvɔ] (German: Sellnow) is a village in the administrative district of Gmina Kołobrzeg, within Kołobrzeg County, West Pomeranian Voivodeship, in north-western Poland. It lies approximately 2 km (1 mi) south of Kołobrzeg and 104 km (65 mi) north-east of the regional capital Szczecin. The village has a population of 1,100.

For the history of the region, see History of Pomerania.
