= Drzonowo, Kołobrzeg County =

Drzonowo
- Village
- Location within Poland
- Coordinates: 54°5′44″N 15°26′6″E
- Country: Poland
- Voivodeship: West Pomeranian
- County: Kołobrzeg
- Gmina: Kołobrzeg
- Population: 940

Drzonowo [dʐɔˈnɔvɔ] (German: Drenow) is a village in the administrative district of Gmina Kołobrzeg, within Kołobrzeg County, West Pomeranian Voivodeship, in north-western Poland. It lies approximately 12 km (7 mi) south-west of Kołobrzeg and 94 km (58 mi) north-east of the regional capital Szczecin.

For the history of the region, see History of Pomerania.

The village has a population of 940.
