= Waddle =

Waddle may refer to:

- Waddle, Pennsylvania, United States
- Waddle (surname), a surname

== See also ==
- Waddling
