= Acacia oshanesii =

Corkwood wattle
- In the Australian National Botanic Gardens

Conservation status
- Least Concern (IUCN 3.1)

Scientific classification
- Kingdom: Plantae
- Clade: Tracheophytes
- Clade: Angiosperms
- Clade: Eudicots
- Clade: Rosids
- Order: Fabales
- Family: Fabaceae
- Subfamily: Caesalpinioideae
- Clade: Mimosoid clade
- Genus: Acacia
- Species: A. oshanesii

Binomial name
- Acacia oshanesii F.Muell. & Maiden
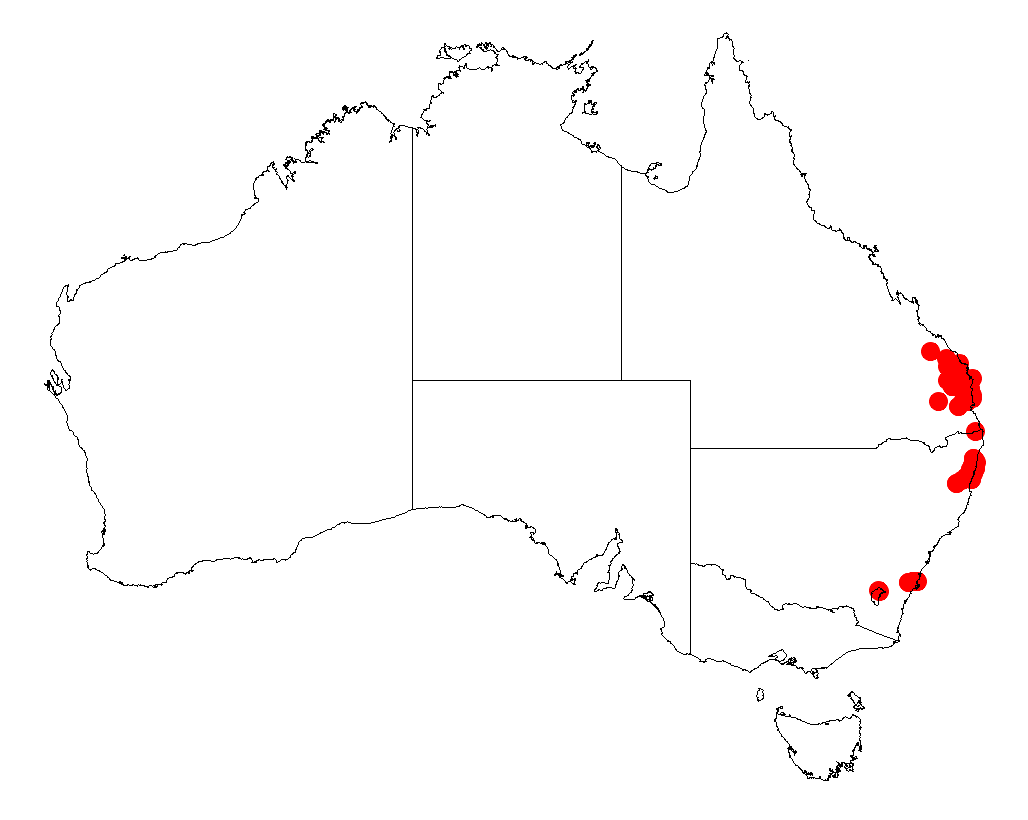
- Occurrence data from AVH

Synonyms
- Acacia arundelliana F.M.Bailey; Acacia decurrens var. ? leichhardtii Benth.; Racosperma oshanesii (F.Muell. & Maiden) Pedley

Species of legume

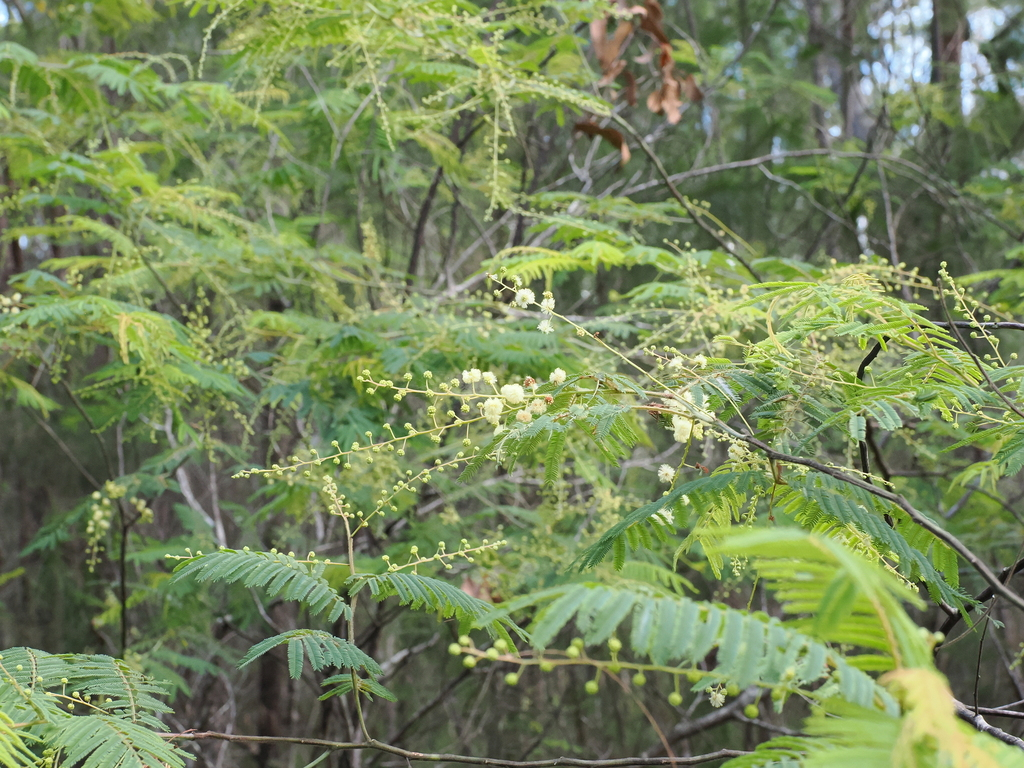
Habit in Mooloolah River National Park

Acacia oshanesii, commonly known as corkwood wattle, irish wattle, silver wattle or feather wattle, is a species of flowering plant in the family Fabaceae, and is endemic to eastern Australia. It is an erect, often diffuse shrub or tree with smooth bark, terete branchlets, bipinnate leaves, spherical heads of pale yellow or cream-coloured flowers and straight to curved, leathery pods.

== Description ==
Acacia oshanesii is an erect shrub or tree that typically grows to a height of up to 15 m (49 ft) and has smooth or slightly fissured bark. Its branchlets are terete, slightly angled flattened near the ends, and have soft, downy, yellowish hairs especially on the ridges. The leaves are bipinnate and sessile or on a petiole up to 3 mm (0.12 in) long, the rachis 50–120 mm (2.0–4.7 in) long, with 7 to 20 pairs of down-curved pinnae 10–47 mm (0.39–1.85 in) long, the lowermost pairs slightly shorter than the others. Each pair of pinnae has 14 to 40 pairs of glabrous, oblong to narrowly oblong pairs of pinnules 1.5–4 mm (0.059–0.157 in) long and 0.5–0.8 mm (0.020–0.031 in) wide. The flowers are borne in spherical heads in racemes or panicles in axils or on the ends of branches, each head on peduncles 3–5 mm (0.12–0.20 in) long with 12 to 25 pale yellow to cream-coloured flowers. Flowering occurs throughout the year, and the pods are straight to curved, more or less straight-sided, 30–140 mm (1.2–5.5 in) long, 7–12 mm (0.28–0.47 in), leathery, brownish black or blue-black and variably constricted between the seeds.

== Taxonomy ==
Acacia oshanesii was first formally described in 1893 by Ferdinand von Mueller and Joseph Maiden in the Proceedings of the Linnean Society of New South Wales from specimens collected by John O'Shanesy near Wide Bay. The specific epithet (oshanesii) in named after the collector or the type specimen.

== Distribution and habitat ==
Corkwood wattle grows in a variety of soil types including gravelly, clay and sandy to loamy in forest and rainforest, from near Maryborough in Queensland to Bellingen and Coff Harbour in New South Wales.

== See also ==
- List of Acacia species
