= Ustronie Morskie =

- Village
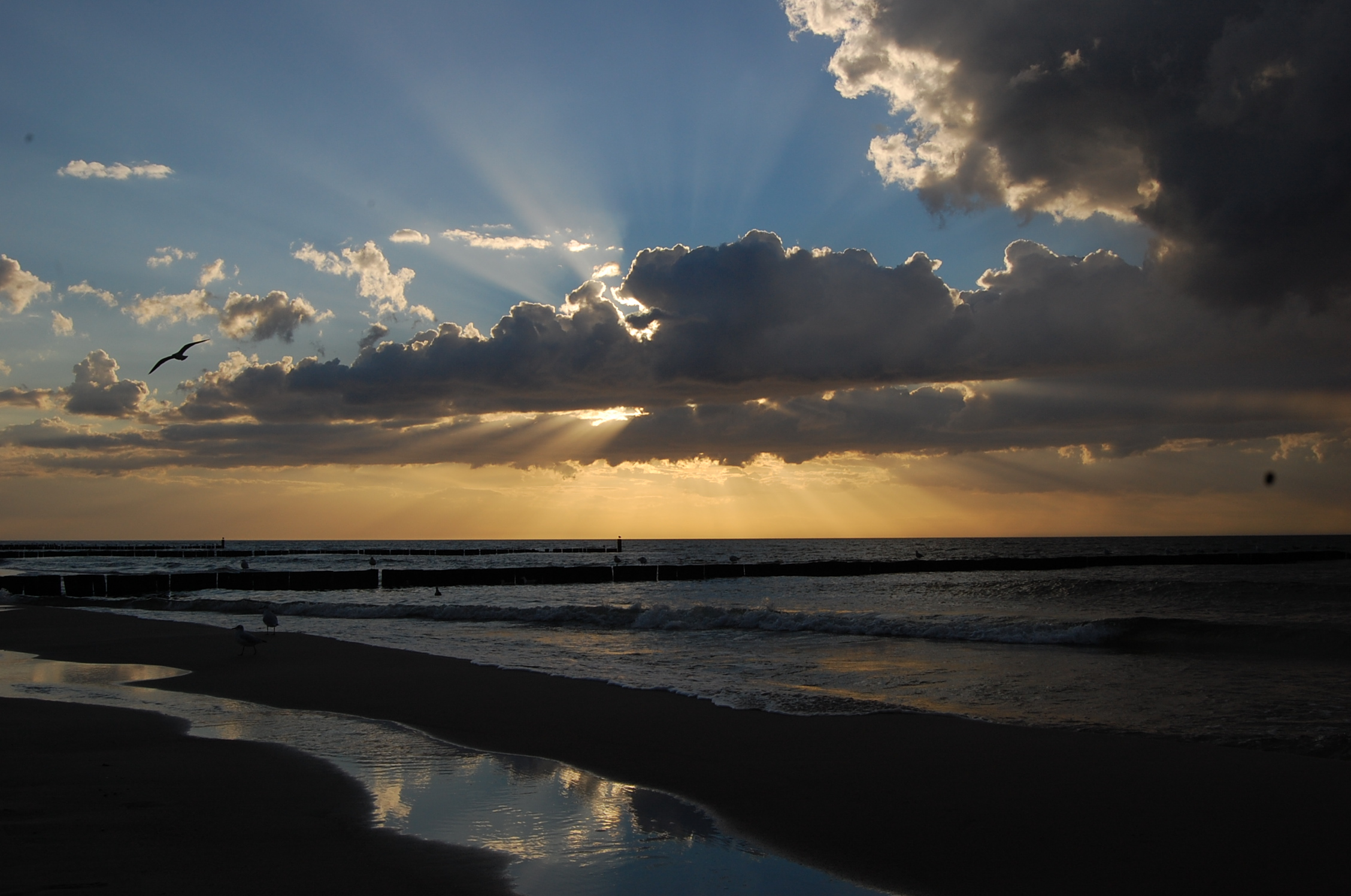
- Beach in Ustronie Morskie in the evening

- Flag Coat of arms

- Location within Poland
- Coordinates: 54°13′N 15°45′E
- Country: Poland
- Voivodeship: West Pomeranian
- County: Kołobrzeg
- Gmina: Ustronie Morskie

Population
  - Total: 2,241
- Time zone: UTC+1 (CET)
  - Summer (DST): UTC+2 (CEST)
- Postal code: 78-111
- Area code: (+48) 94
- Vehicle registration: ZKL
- Website: http://www.ustronie-morskie.pl

Ustronie Morskie [usˈtrɔɲɛ ˈmɔrskʲɛ] (German: Henkenhagen) is a village in Kołobrzeg County, West Pomeranian Voivodeship, Poland. It is the seat of the gmina (administrative district) called Gmina Ustronie Morskie. It lies approximately 14 km (9 mi) north-east of Kołobrzeg and 118 km (73 mi) north-east of the regional capital Szczecin. It is located on the Slovincian Coast, within the historic region of Pomerania.

Ustronie Morskie is a popular summer tourist destination with a beach, guesthouses and restaurants. A Neo-Gothic church of the Exaltation of the Holy Cross is located in Ustronie Morskie.

The village has a population of 1,800.

== Gallery ==
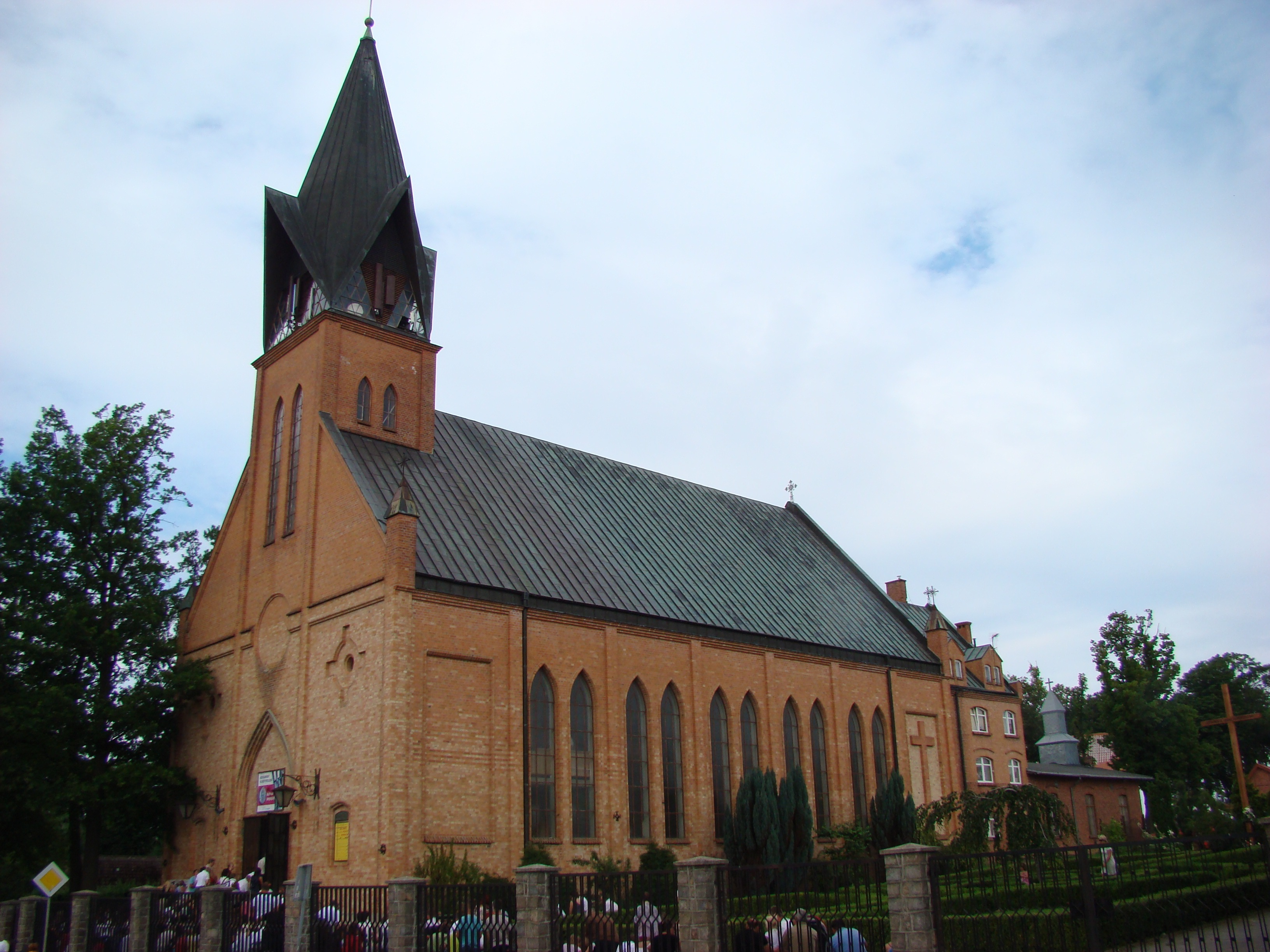
Exaltation of the Holy Cross church

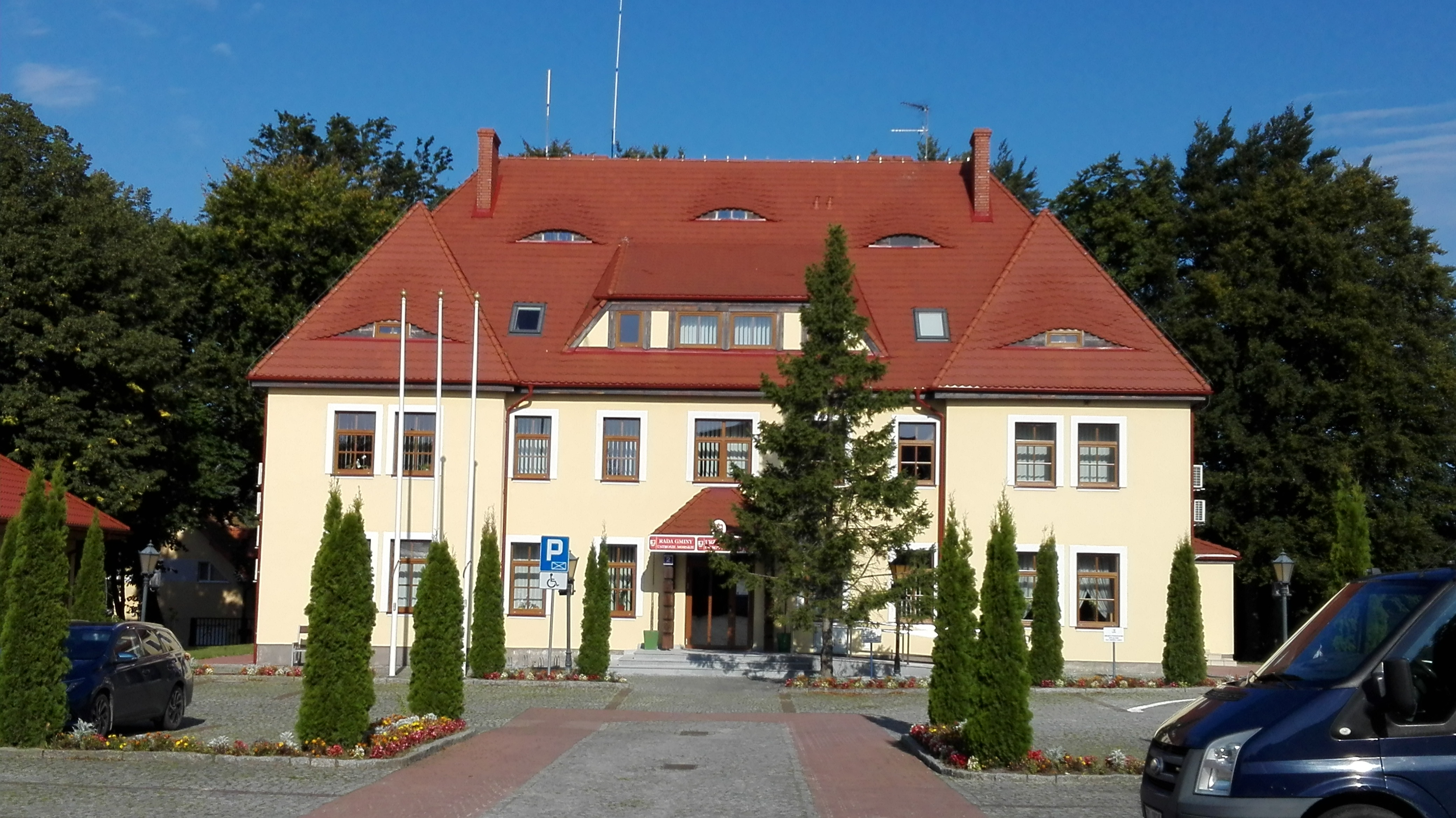
Gmina Ustronie Morskie office

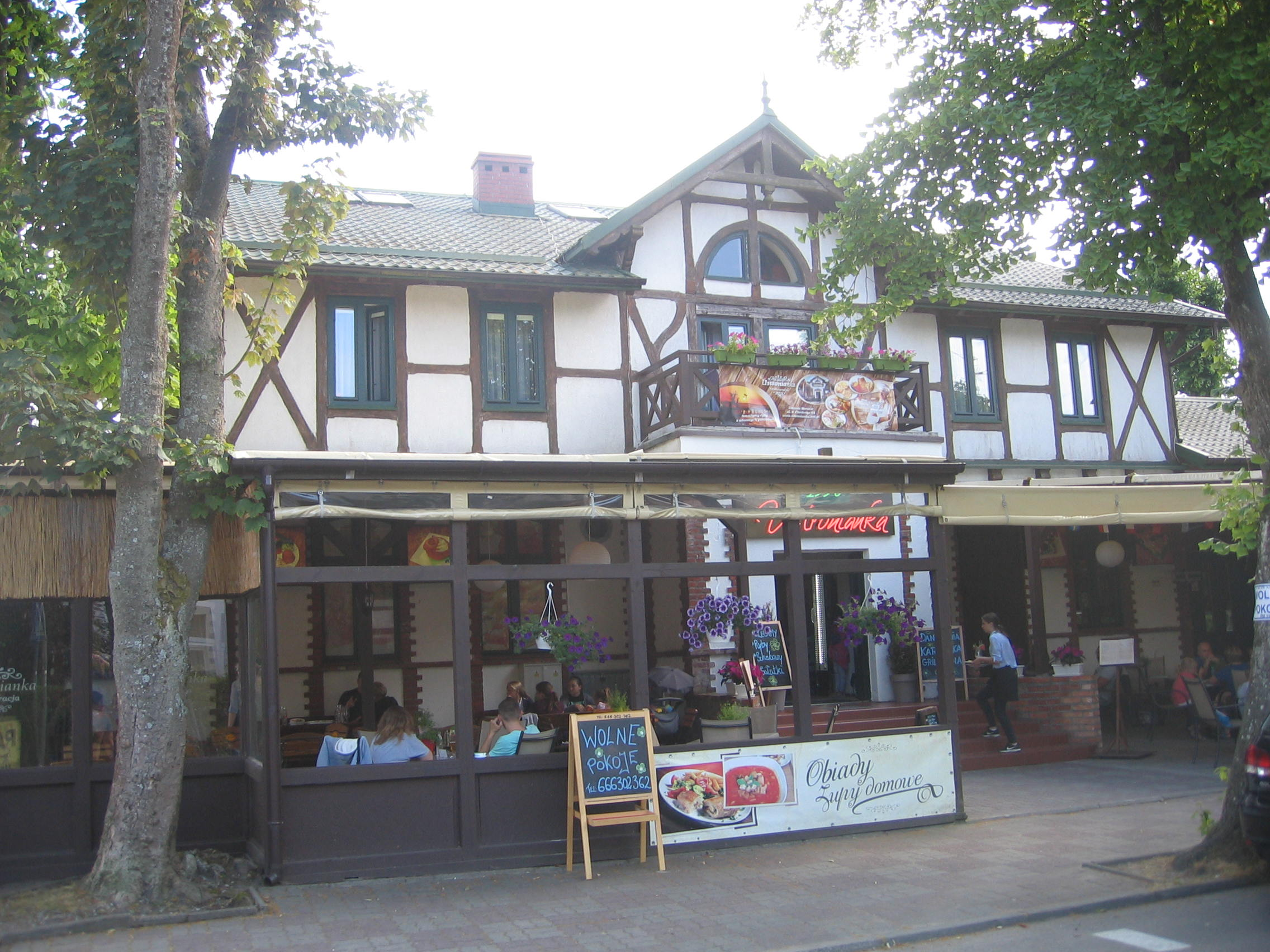
Restaurant in Ustronie Morskie

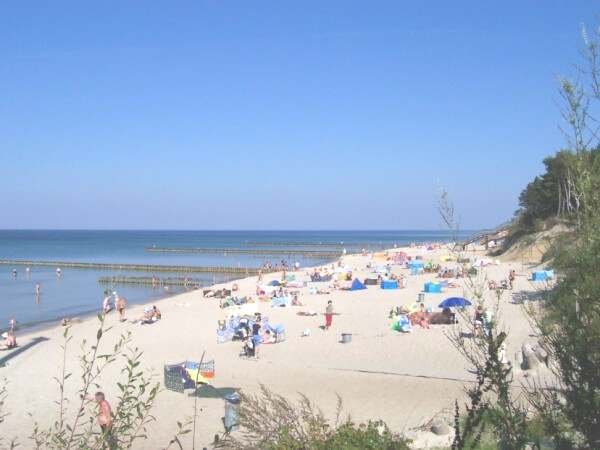
Beach in Ustronie Morskie
