= Siemyśl =

- Village
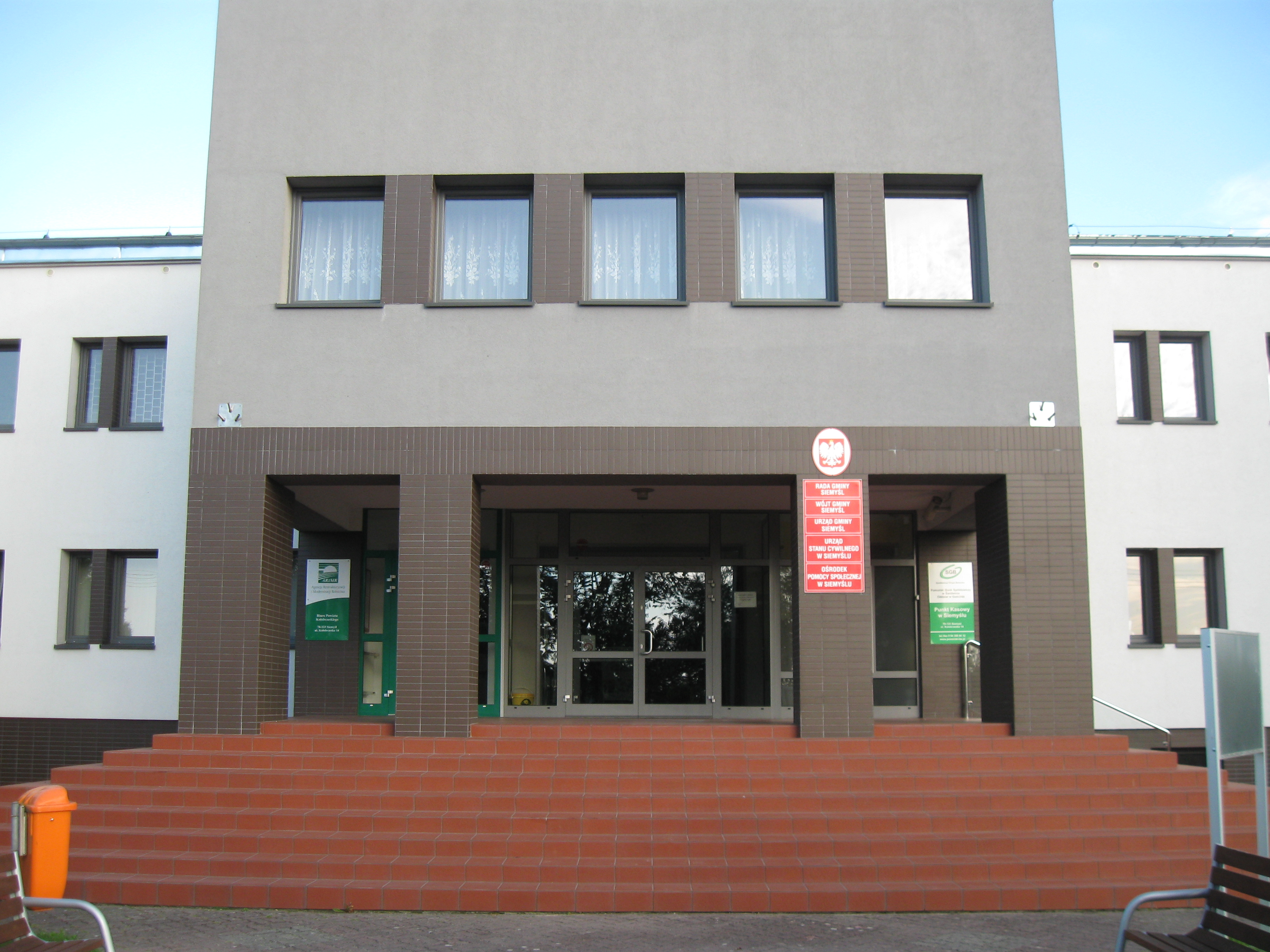
- Town Hall

- Location within Poland
- Coordinates: 54°1′42″N 15°31′55″E
- Country: Poland
- Voivodeship: West Pomeranian
- County: Kołobrzeg
- Gmina: Siemyśl
- Population: 510

Siemyśl [ˈɕɛmɨɕl] (German Simötzel) is a village in Kołobrzeg County, West Pomeranian Voivodeship, in north-western Poland. It is the seat of the gmina (administrative district) called Gmina Siemyśl. It lies approximately 16 km (10 mi) south of Kołobrzeg and 93 km (58 mi) north-east of the regional capital Szczecin.

For the history of the region, see History of Pomerania.

The village has a population of 510.
