= Rymań =

- Village
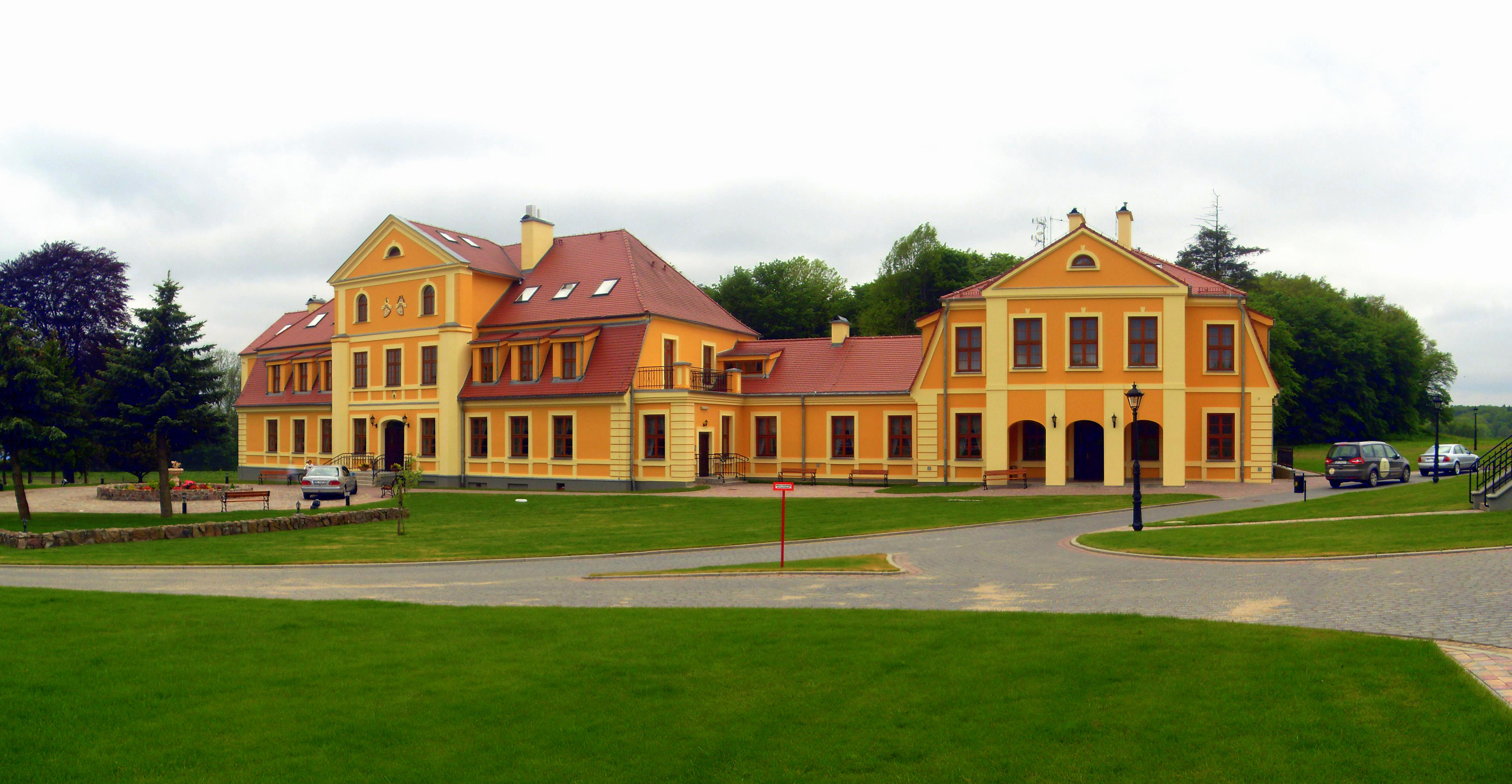
- Palace in Rymań

- Location within Poland
- Coordinates: 53°56′45″N 15°31′52″E
- Country: Poland
- Voivodeship: West Pomeranian
- County: Kołobrzeg
- Gmina: Rymań
- Population: 1,214

Rymań [ˈrɨmaɲ] (German: Roman) is a village in Kołobrzeg County, West Pomeranian Voivodeship, in north-western Poland. It is the seat of the gmina (administrative district) called Gmina Rymań. It lies approximately 25 km (16 mi) south of Kołobrzeg and 86 km (53 mi) north-east of the regional capital Szczecin.

For the history of the region, see History of Pomerania.

The village has a population of 1,214.
