= Kołobrzeg County =

Kołobrzeg County Powiat kołobrzeski
- County
- Flag Coat of arms

- Location within the voivodeship

- Division into gminas
- Coordinates (Kołobrzeg): 54°10′N 15°34′E
- Country: Poland
- Voivodeship: West Pomeranian
- Seat: Kołobrzeg
- Gminas: Total 7 (incl. 1 urban): Kołobrzeg; Gmina Dygowo; Gmina Gościno; Gmina Kołobrzeg; Gmina Rymań; Gmina Siemyśl; Gmina Ustronie Morskie

Area
  - Total: 725.86 km^{2} (280.26 sq mi)

Population (2006)
  - Total: 76,089
  - Density: 104.83/km^{2} (271.50/sq mi)
  - Urban: 44,794
  - Rural: 31,295
- Car plates: ZKL
- Website: www.powiat.kolobrzeg.pl

Kołobrzeg County (Polish: powiat kołobrzeski) is a unit of territorial administration and local government (powiat) in West Pomeranian Voivodeship, north-western Poland, on the Baltic coast. It came into being on January 1, 1999, as a result of the Polish local government reforms passed in 1998. Its administrative seat is Kołobrzeg, which lies on the coast 106 kilometres (66 mi) north-east of the regional capital Szczecin. Its only other town is Gościno.

The county covers an area of 725.86 square kilometres (280.3 sq mi). As of 2006 its total population was 76,089, out of which the population of Kołobrzeg was 44,794 and the rural population was 31,295.

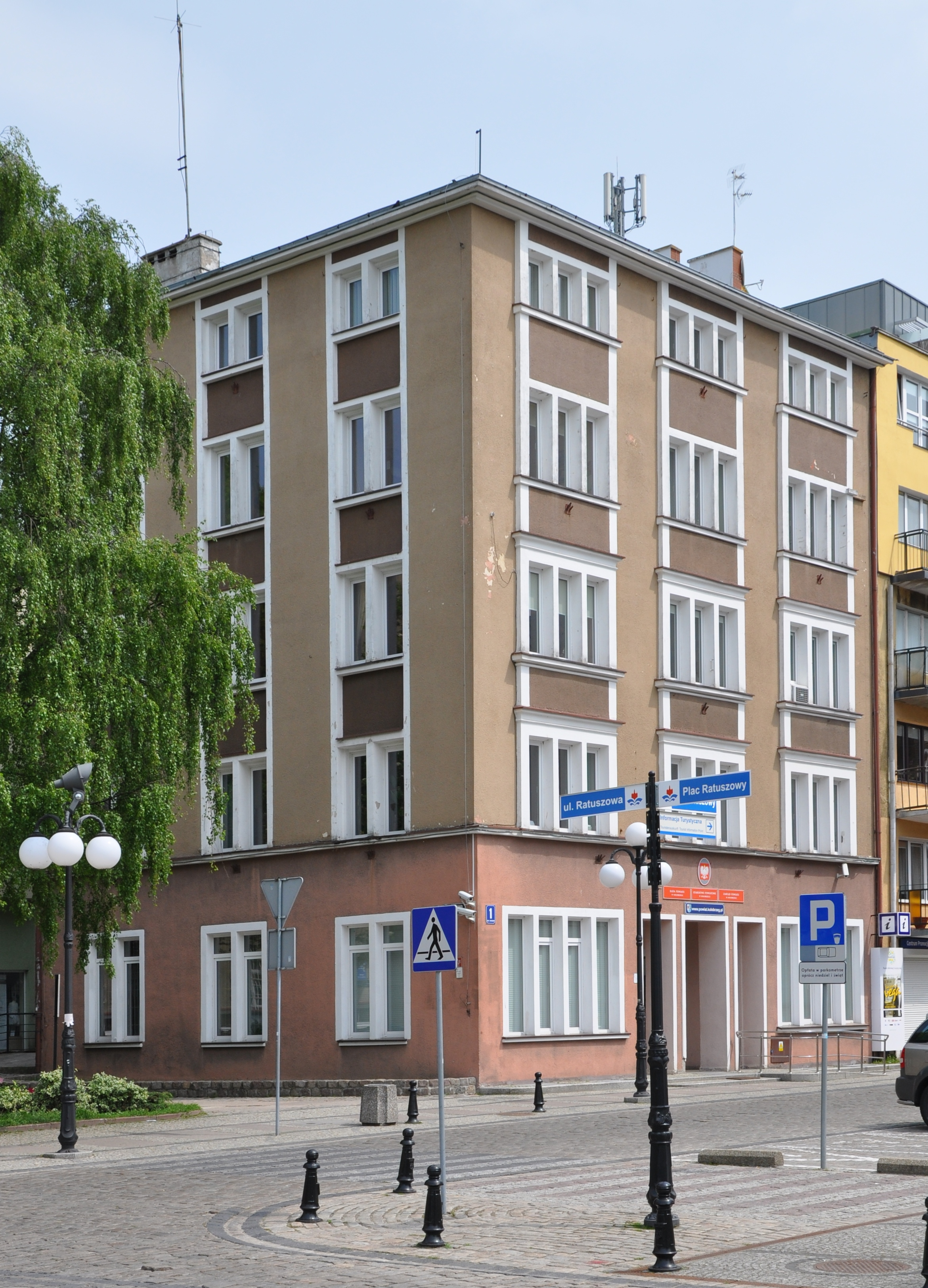
County seat (starostwo powiatowe)

== Neighbouring counties ==
Kołobrzeg County is bordered by Koszalin County to the east, Białogard County to the south-east, Świdwin County and Łobez County to the south, and Gryfice County to the south-west. It also borders the Baltic Sea to the north.

== Administrative divisions ==
The county is subdivided into seven gminas (one urban, one urban-rural and five rural). These are listed in the following table, in descending order of population.

Gmina	Type	Area (km^{2})	Population (2006)	Seat
Kołobrzeg	urban	25.7	44,794	
Gmina Kołobrzeg	rural	144.8	9,176	Kołobrzeg *
Gmina Dygowo	rural	128.6	5,605	Dygowo
Gmina Gościno	urban-rural	116.0	5,136	Gościno
Gmina Rymań	rural	146.1	4,183	Rymań
Gmina Ustronie Morskie	rural	57.3	3,613	Ustronie Morskie
Gmina Siemyśl	rural	107.4	3,582	Siemyśl
* seat not part of the gmina
