= History of Gryfice =

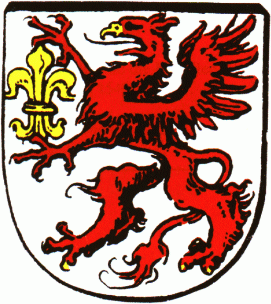
Pre-war coat of arms of Gryfice

Nova civitas (New city), today's Gryfice, was granted town privileges in 1262 by Duke Wartislaw III of the House of Griffin. The city was established under Lübeck law on the left bank of the lower Rega river. From 1262 to 1648, it belonged to the lands of the Pomeranian dukes, from the House of Griffin. From 1648 to 1701, it was part of Brandenburg-Prussia. From 1701 to 1918, it belonged to the Kingdom of Prussia (since 1871, part of the German Empire), and from 1918 to the state of Prussia within the German Reich. From 1919 to 1933, Gryfice belonged to the Weimar Republic, while from 1933 to 1945, it was part of Nazi Germany. From 1945 to 1952, Gryfice belonged to Rzeczpospolita, from 1952 to 1989 to the Polish People's Republic, and since 1989 to Rzeczpospolita.

Despite armed attacks from numerous robber barons, wartime devastation, and frequent fires, Gryfice developed quite dynamically. They reached their economic peak between the 14th and the mid-16th centuries. Later, even after World War II, they did not lose their significance in the region. The city plays an important role in the political, economic, and social life of the local community.

== Traces of pre-locational and locational settlement of the city ==
Research conducted by German and Polish archaeologists indicates that the Gryfice land was inhabited during the Neolithic period. Evidence of material culture from this period has been found in Bielikowo, Gąbino, Gosław, Pruszcz, and Strzykocin, which has been confirmed in later periods. Additionally, settlement in these areas was confirmed in later periods (the Bronze Age), including in Kołomąć, Kępa, Mojszewko, Rewal, Smolęcin, Wyszków, Cerkwica, Niedźwiedziska, Rogozina, Niedysz, Chomętowo, Skrobotowo, Rzęskowo, Wołczyn, Witno, and Trzebusz.

Studies based on sources indicate that these areas were inhabited by Germanic peoples in the 2nd century AD. Ptolemy's treatise – Geography (Greek) Γεωγραφικὴ Ὑφήγησις (2nd century AD) – lists among these peoples those who inhabited the areas of today's Western Pomerania and Gdańsk. Contemporary studies on the treatise (D. Stichtenoth) indicate that the areas from the Szczecin Lagoon to the east to the Wieprza river were inhabited by the Sidini. Their western neighbors were the Farodinians, and their eastern neighbors were the Rutiklians.

Archaeological research has not confirmed the continuity of settlement in these areas, reaching Gryfice back to the V period of the Bronze Age (Hallstatt period) – the Lusatian culture, or the later period – the Jastorf culture. (Note: These are the princely graves of the Lusatian group, dating back to the 4th century BC. Archaeological research has confirmed the temporal continuity of settlement from the 4th century BC to the 1st century AD.) Some researchers, based on traces indicating a developing early medieval settlement in this area between the 5th and 7th/8th centuries, speculated that the beginning of the town was given by three hamlets from around the 10th century, one of which (possibly a gord) could have formed the basis for the future location. The location of the town in an area developed before the 13th century was confirmed by contemporary archaeological research. Archaeologist Marek Dworaczyk excavated and described the remains of a settlement (hearths and artifacts) with strong influences of the Hallstatt culture (Bronze Age period, i.e., 10th–8th centuries BC) in the area of the present-day Treasury Office in Gryfice on Niepodległości Street. The settlement extended northeast towards the current Victory Square.

It is also not known what the nature and type of the settlement were at that time. However, it is known that it was inhabited by people of the Lusatian culture and temporarily penetrated by inhabitants of the nearby Lubieszewo. In the Old Town, surface surveys were conducted in the 1960s, and specialized archaeological research has been carried out for about 20 years. They were carried out during investment works (infrastructure retrofitting). Historical sources from the late Middle Ages were excavated in several parts of the Old Town. Right next to Wałowa Street, in its southern part (S), relicts of the city wall were excavated, and the sediment level of the moat was registered. Fragments of city fortifications were also excavated on Klasztorna Street. Further discoveries recorded cultural layers on Niepodległości Street (14th–15th century), while on Ruta Street, surveys and linear excavations revealed fragments of wooden pavement, which was made of planks and beams. According to archaeologists, they constituted part of the street and fragments of residential and economic buildings (13th–14th century).

Marek Dworaczyk, after analyzing the existing archaeological research, summarized the knowledge about the beginnings of Nova civitas as follows:

In the light of the data available today (...) Gryfice arose on the so-called "raw root," in a relatively sparsely populated area. It seems that the primary intention of founding the town in this area was both settlement and economic intensification in this part of Pomerania.

== Middle ages ==
In the early Middle Ages, the territories of the Gryfice land were inhabited by the tribes of the Western Pomeranians. These were circles of influence, according to newer research – the Wolinians, Prissani, and Brzeżans (deriving from Lechitic tribes, the same as the Veleti), and later, until the mid-13th century, the Kashubians, (Note: According to T. Wróblewski, by 1246 the Kashubians had settled the area east of the Parsęta river.) and not, as previously erroneously suggested, the Severians. (Note: These tribes were advocated by Ryszard Wołągiewicz, among others. Modern researchers, including K. T. Witczak, deny this information. The Siewierz people were interested in the areas on the Desna, Sula and Seim (Ukraine). J. Mościcki, on the other hand, placed the Severians among the Polish tribes in the Siewierz area.) Remnants of early medieval settlements are hillforts in Lubin, Prusinowo, Trzygłów, and Witno.

During the times of Mieszko I and Bolesław I the Brave, these lands were briefly annexed to the Polish state. In 1121 (or 1119), the Battle of Niekładz (Latin: Naclam) took place in the Gryfice land, in which Bolesław III Wrymouth defeated the forces of Western Pomerania led by the dukes Wartislaw I and Swietopelk I. In the spring of 1124, at the behest of Duke Bolesław Wrymouth, a mission of Bishop Otto of Bamberg arrived at the lower Rega. In the nearby Clodonie (Latin) (probably today's Kłodkowo), the Wends (Slavs) from the area were baptized without any resistance. Folklore also states that the teachings of the new faith were carried out in a place called "Apostołów", land lying between today's Gryfice and Trzygłów.

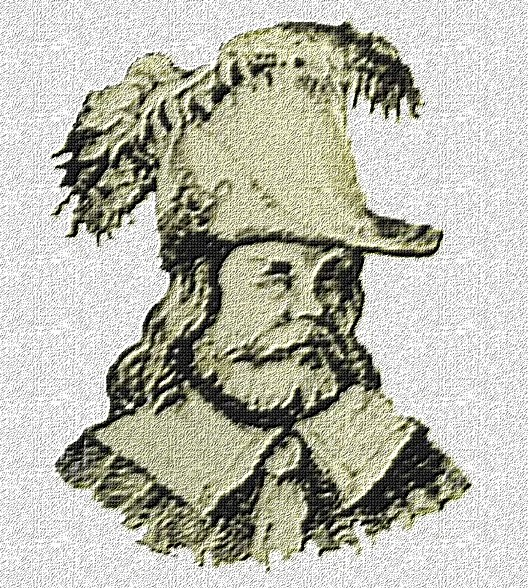
Duke Wartislaw III

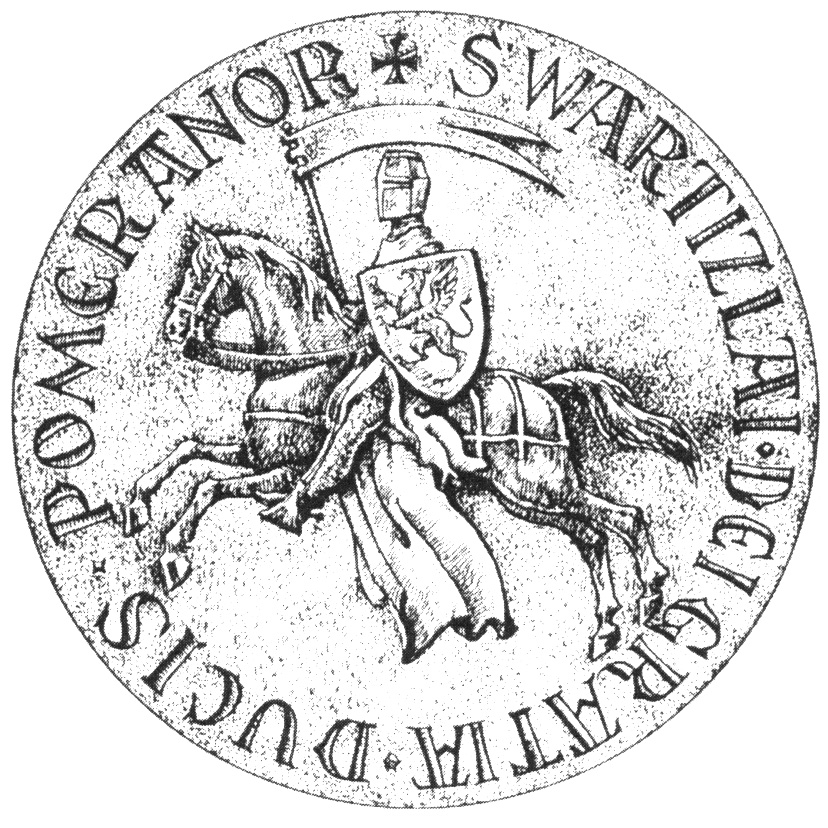
Seal of Wartislaw III from 1242

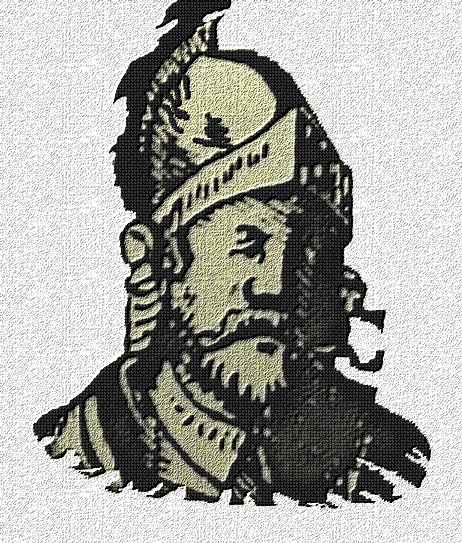
Duke Barnim I

In the mid-13th century, the rulers of Pomerania were the princes from the Pomeranian House of Griffin, Barnim I and Wartislaw III, who encouraged settlement in these areas to strengthen their power. Barnim I, the Duke of Szczecin, ruling the eastern areas, settled mainly German population here, while Wartislaw III, the Duke of Demmin, ruling the western areas, encouraged Dutch and Danish settlers to settle. From 1234, Barnim I and Wartislaw III competed with each other in founding cities. Wartislaw founded Greifswald, Demmin, and Kołobrzeg. In 1262, he issued a town charter based on Lübeck law, in which the settlement (composed of three villages) received town privileges and 100 lans of land in the vicinity of the lower Rega river. The town charter designated the city's name as Nova civitas supra Regam (New city above the Rega). Lokator of the city, Jakob von Trebetow, received 20 lans of land and the task of founding the city. After the death of Wartislaw III, the owner of his lands became Barnim I, who confirmed the grants of location and rights. From his time comes the name of the city – Civitat Griphemberch super Regam (Gryfia Góra – city above the Rega) from 21 September 1264. The locality received customs rights, forest clearance, navigation on the Redze river and coastal waters, temporary tax exemption (for 10 years), enabling it to become significantly wealthier.

In the course of the 13th century, the significance of the center increased. After the town's founding, a rural gmina was established in Gryfice (an important administrative link), which took over the former functions of the pre-location settlement. (Note: Sources indicate that in 1261 Pomeranian Duke Barnim I, following the model of Magdeburg, introduced equal rights for Jews in his state, who could also hold office. However, it is not known whether they participated in the local community of Gryfice. The first mentions of Jews come as late as 1692 and in the mid-18th century when 7 Jewish families were mentioned.) The dukes of Szczecin entrusted the city with a significant portion of taxes, courts, and jura regalia. The center was subordinate to the castellania of Kamień Pomorski. The first merchants, settlers in Gryfice, were residents of Gryfia (today's Greifswald in Germany). The influx of Germans was gradual and did not cause drastic changes in local governing spheres. Merchants organized the purchase of profitable products, including grains, wax, hides, resin, hemp, meat, and honey. Goods were exported to counterparties in Lübeck, and from there to further European recipients. However, the basis for the city's development was native trade and the development of local craftsmanship. Numerous sołectwos, mills, and taverns were established. Gryfice's export goods were associated with annual markets held in the city. The largest of these included St. Gawel's Fair (October 10), honey markets (September 30), and poultry markets.

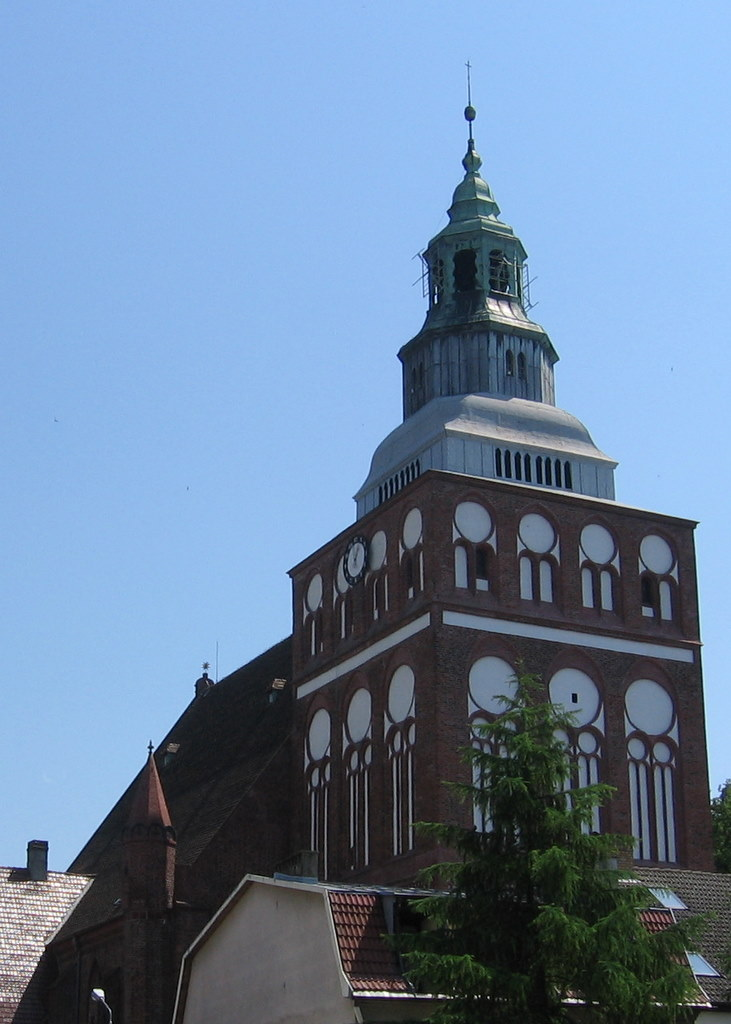
The tower of St. Mary's Church

At the end of the 13th century, the construction of the brick St. Mary's church with three naves began, and in 1300, the construction of defensive walls surrounding the city. Their total length reached 650 meters with a span of 200–350 meters. The city fortifications were enriched with 3 gates (High Gate with a foregate, Stone Gate, and Rega Gate with a barbican), 3 shooting towers (Powder Tower, Bridge Tower, and Mill Tower), numerous bastions, and a moat. The municipal council consisted of 9 to 12 councilors. Every year on St. Michael's Day (September 29), 1/3 of the council was changed. The authorities took over lower judiciary functions. In 1316 and 1357, the city entered into alliances against robbers who conducted raids, plundered, and attacked neighboring villages. These alliances restored the normalization of life and economic development.

At the turn of the 13th and 14th centuries, Gryfice had about 500 inhabitants. In the city center, near the main market square, a massive Gothic town hall was erected, which served various functions. The first mention of the mayor of Gryfice dates back to 1398. It was Hinze Slede, who served in this capacity until 1419. The town hall housed cloth halls and the seat of the lay court. In the basement of this building was the municipal prison with a dungeon, carcer subterranensis. Since 1327, the city had the right to impose punishment (gallows, stake, sword, and executioner's axe). Next to the town hall was the "weigh house", where butchers and bakers paid taxes. Religious life flourished. In the 13th century, a Franciscan monastery was established here, along with an adjoining church (on Bracka and Klasztorna streets). In the following century, the city already had 5 churches with almshouses and hospitals. (Note: The first church was the parish church, the second was the Franciscan monastery church, the third was St. Spirit's, and the fourth was St. George's. The fifth church in Gryfice was St. Gertrude's Church, built in 1388 in front of the High Gate. All the churches were Catholic.)

In one of the documents from 1386, a Latin school in Gryfice was mentioned, commonly referred to as the oldest "Latin" school in Pomerania. (Note: The first source information about a school in Western Pomerania dates back to 1089. In Trzebiatów, 19 km from Gryfice, a Latin school was established in 1328.) The position of this school was not high. The rector (rector scolarium), Johannes Parsow, was denied the title dominus and was only referred to as "master". His students were called "apprentices of the teaching art". They formed the church choir and were obliged to participate in three consecutive services, funerals, and assistance to the sick. The school operated under the patronage of the St. Mary's church. According to H. Berghaus, such a school in Gryfice was only established in 1426.

Next to the splendid houses of the patricians and knights, buildings made of wood and clay, covered with reeds or straw, were erected. Gryfice had two guilds – merchants and brewers. Craftsmanship was represented by numerous guild organizations. Craftsmen were responsible for transporting supplies for the princely court, maintaining fortification equipment, cleaning moats, and providing armed protection for the city. Besides merchants and craftsmen, the city was inhabited by a large number of commoners, engaged in the heaviest work related to construction, transportation, and navigation. They were also employed in herding municipal and private cattle herds. The wealth of the merchants determined their position in the city and strengthened the power of this group in Gryfice's social life.

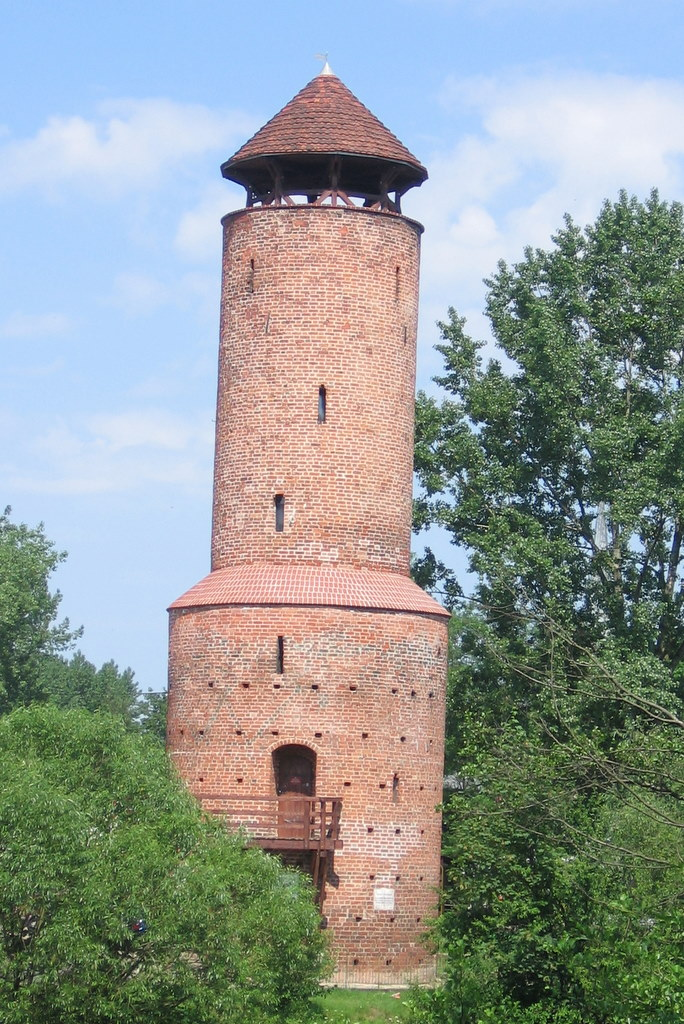
Powder Tower

Maritime trade and navigation on the Rega river developed. Probably in the mid-14th century, Gryfice became an associate member of the Hanseatic League (1365), (Note: J. Mitkowski believes that Gryfice was not a direct member of the Hanseatic League. It was supposed to be subordinate to the port city of Kołobrzeg. The terms of Gryfice's membership in the Hanseatic League were kept on the same terms as with other full members.) although for evading regulations regarding fish markets in Scania, the city was expelled from the league for three years (1366). Membership was restored for participating in the war between the league and the Danish king (1368–1370). In the years 1394–1401, the city provided two ships with an 80-man crew to combat pirates, known as the "Victual Brothers".

In the 15th century, Gryfice three times joined the alliances of Pomeranian cities (1427, 1471, and 1481). The city provided assistance, especially financial, to the ruling dukes in disputes over succession and in suppressing noble revolts. In the struggle for the primacy of the burghers in the city's political life, Gryfice contributed to the weakening of the nobility. (Note: The union was established in 1418. It was initially composed of Słupsk, Darłowo and Sławno. The union was expanded to include other cities in 1427.)

In 1464, Otto III granted Gryfice the privilege of minting its own currency, which the city never utilized. It was one of the last documents issued by the Duke of Szczecin before his death.

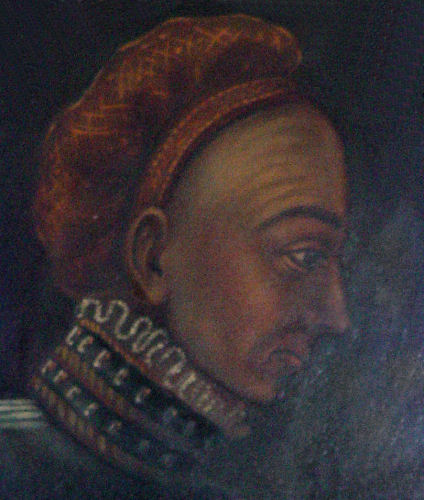
Duke Bogislaw X

In the 15th century, there were several disputes over fishing rights and trade with Trzebiatów, located north of Gryfice, which attempted to impose tariffs on Gryfice ships traversing the Rega (similarly to what happened with the Norbertine monastery in Białoboki in the 14th century). In 1449, Trzebiatów attempted to block the river for all ships coming from the south, leading to an escalation of the conflict. Bogislaw X clarified the situation, ending the forty-year period of conflict between the two cities along the lower Rega (1488).

The latter half of the 15th century brought organizational changes to the Gryfice school. In the founding document of 1477, the duties of the rector of the Latin high school (German: Lateinschulen), Leonardus, were formulated. The city council referred to the rector as "our city servant" (German: unserer Stadt Denere). From then on, the school became a municipal institution. The teacher's salary was 90 grzywnas (half of the teacher's income was covered by the students). By the end of the 15th century, the school employed two teachers – the rector and the cantor.

== Early modern period ==
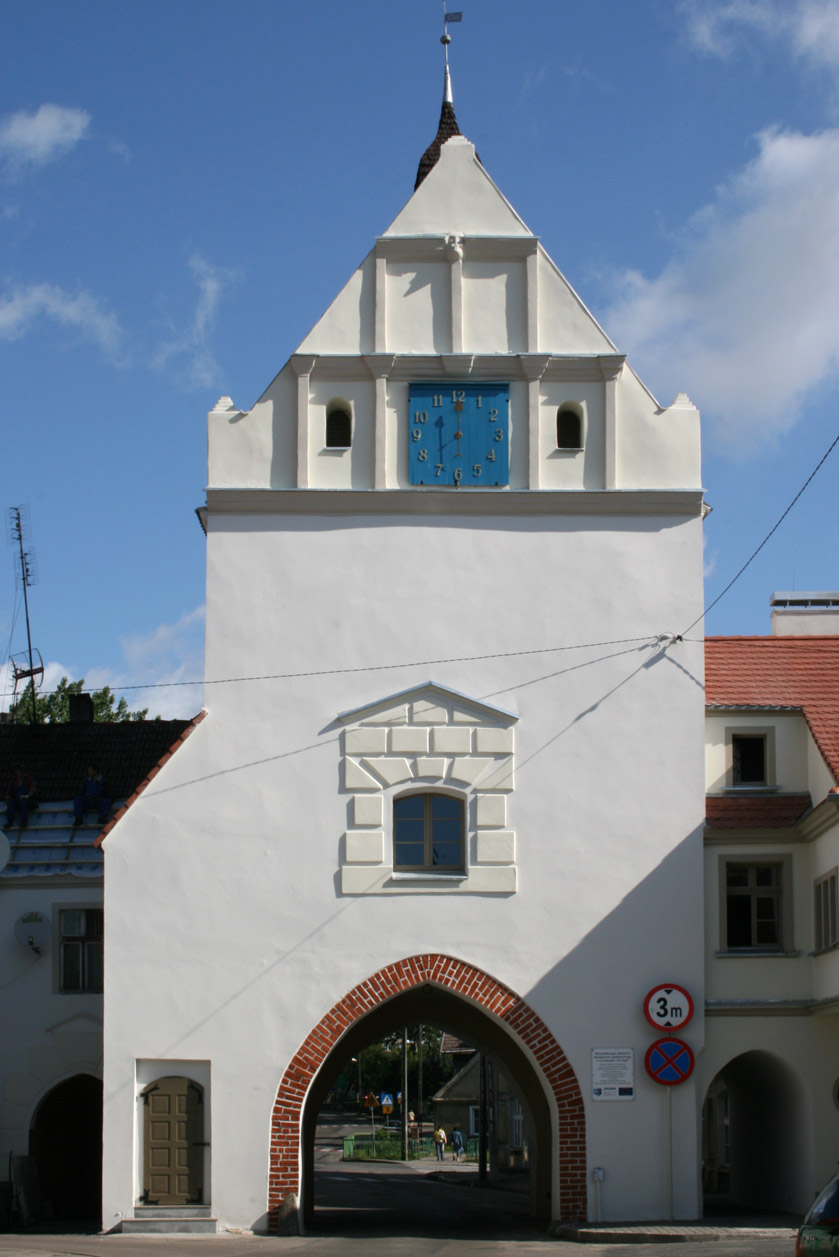
Stone Gate in Gryfice

In the early 16th century, the population of Gryfice exceeded 2,000 inhabitants. The Low German name of the city, Griphemberch, gradually transformed into Griffenberge. (Note: The German name of the city is given, among others, by E. Lubinus on the Great Map of the Duchy of Pomerania in 1618.) In 1534, the parish church became the property of the Lutheran church. This was a result of the gradual introduction of the new religion to the Pomeranian territories. The residents of Gryfice leaned towards the Reformation, initiated by Martin Luther in 1517. There were many reasons for this – disputes with the Norbertines of Białoboki, close contacts with the center of Protestant thought in Trzebiatów, resentment towards the papacy caused by a papal court ruling from 1450 (related to the conflict with the Norbertines of Białoboki over free navigation and trade on the Rega river), competition from monks in trade, crafts, and agriculture, as well as strong influences from supporters of the new church. In 1525, the city council seized the church treasury, and ten years later, it took over all the assets and properties of the monasteries. Over the course of a hundred years, the city experienced a second wave of Germanization, which, in addition to important offices, also affected the church. (Note: The mastery of the town council and guild authorities by Germans, the introduction of the German language in town books and merchant records do not at all indicate the rapid Germanization of Gryfice.)

After 1534, following the Reformation, changes occurred in education. A new curriculum was introduced in the municipal school, where German, Latin, and Greek were taught. It envisaged the establishment of three classes and the employment of three teachers: a rector, a sub-rector, and a cantor. In 1580, a school for girls was opened there.

In the 16th century, ethnic movements took place. A wave of German settlers arrived in place of peasants fleeing to the Polish-Lithuanian Commonwealth.

In 1538 and 1554, there was a renewed escalation of conflict with Trzebiatów. It was caused by Gryfice residents not delivering the undersupply for the renovation of breakwaters and the construction of ships, which were too large compared to the lock capacity. The conflict ended in 1589. (Note: In 1686 there was already a final conflict between Gryfice and Trzebiatów. The dispute concerned timber floating down the Rega river. The matter was settled through mutual negotiations.) The passage of Brunswick troops through Gryfice in the 1560s (during the Northern Seven Years' War) caused extensive damage and losses in the city's economy. As a result, there was an economic regression lasting until the second half of the 17th century. In 1595 and 1620, there were rebellions by dissatisfied craftsmen who demanded a share in governing the city. Their aspirations were not realized. In the 16th and 17th centuries, many witch trials took place in Pomerania, including Gryfice. Women accused of practicing black magic and spreading superstitions were charged. The shooting guild began its activities in 1603.

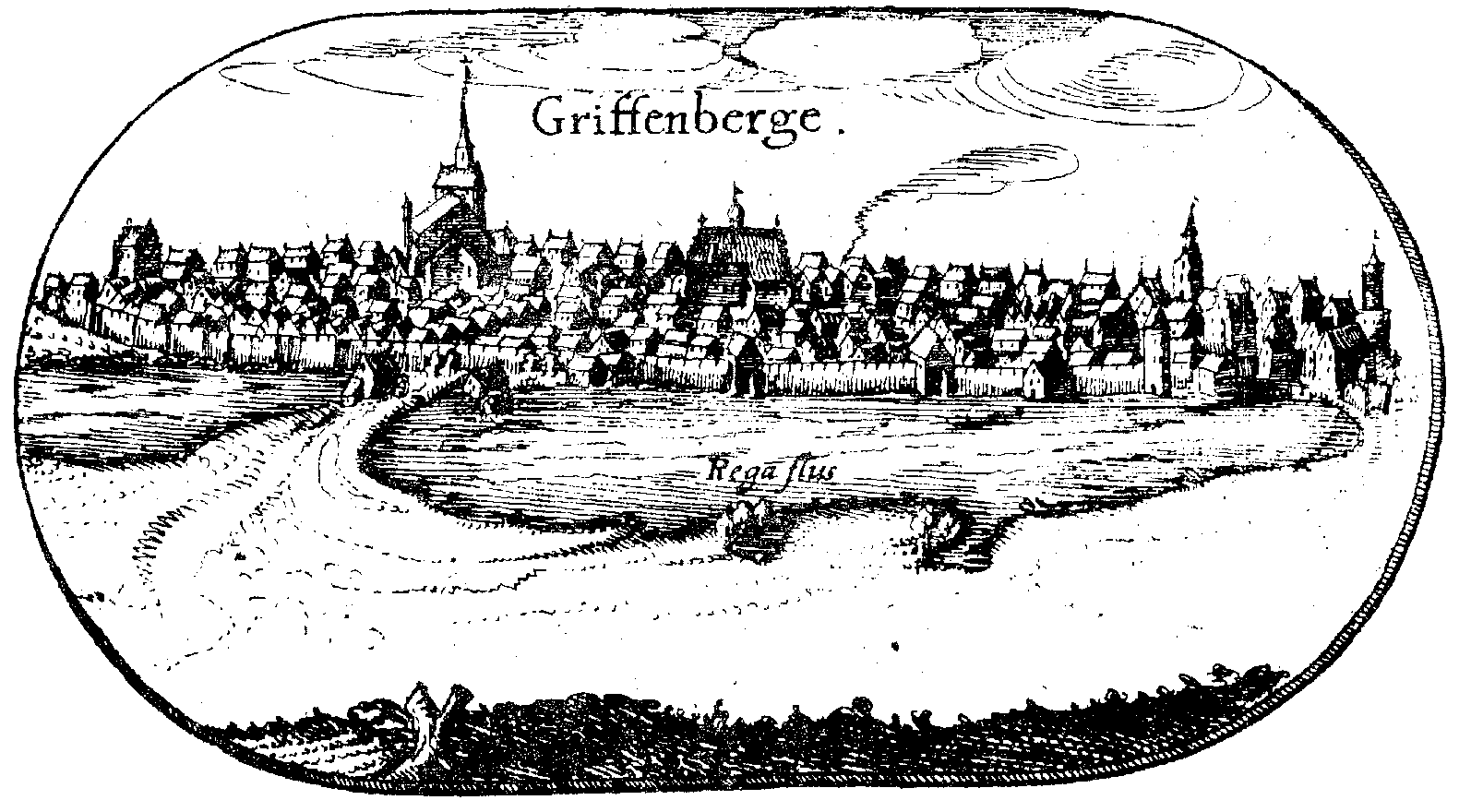
Panorama of Gryfice according to J. Wolfart on the Great Map of the Pomeranian Duchy by Lubinus (1618)

In 1618, the Thirty Years' War began, disrupting the development of the city. On 4 December 1627, formations of Albrecht von Wallenstein entered Gryfice. Three companies of the imperial cuirassier regiment were quartered there. In addition to the expenses for maintaining the garrison, the people of Gryfice suffered enormous losses due to looting and arson. Numerous murders and rapes terrorized the local population. The occupiers seized weapons and ammunition from the local arsenal. After imposing a new contribution of 1200 guilders on the city in 1629, a complaint was filed at the imperial court, as a result of which the cuirassiers left the city. (Note: The census of Gryfice's property from that time attested to the town's wealth. The town had 131 houses, 189 kennels, 89 cellars, 4 mills, 2 inns, 13 villages and 36 hamlets.) Repression was also avoided the following year when Italian mercenary troops were stationed in Gryfice. Due to the spreading plague, the population decreased by about 75%. The decrease in the city's population was also caused by numerous residents fleeing from the occupier and oppressive taxation. Imperial troops plundered surrounding villages and the city until the arrival of Swedish troops in August 1630. The Swedes acted as official allies of the Duke of Szczecin. Gryfice experienced another period of disasters and destruction. At that time, 7,000 Swedish, Irish, and Scottish soldiers were quartered in the city and its surroundings.

In 1637, the last Griffin, Bogislaw XIV, died. There were concerns about the annexation of the country to Brandenburg-Prussia. Annexation was guaranteed by succession agreements from 1493 and 1571. Due to the "hard law of war", the troops demanded increasingly new supplies of foodstuffs, which severely strained the productive capabilities of the population. From 1643, partisan activity began under Colonel Matthias von Krockow (a fanatical enemy of the Swedes). The population of nearby villages felt this most acutely. For a significant sum of money, the city bought itself out of further raids. The last years of the Thirty Years' War led to visible impoverishment of the city. It no longer resembled a thriving center of trade and production from the Middle Ages. The wealthiest fortunes collapsed (including the guild of clothiers). By the Peace of Westphalia in Osnabrück in 1648, the city was incorporated into Brandenburg-Prussia. The new authorities sought to win over the Pomeranians. A Pomeranian collegiate parliament was established, which also included representatives from Gryfice. One of them was given the honorary title of landrat. In the mid-17th century, the reconstruction of the city began, which was interrupted by the new Second Northern War, also known as the "Swedish Deluge" (1655–1660).

In 1657, cavalry units under Stefan Czarniecki approached Gryfice in pursuit of the Swedes. (Note: H. Riemann's loose conclusion about the stay of Czarniecki's cavalry at Gryfice was refuted by E. Rymar.) Numerous bandit raids accompanied the imposed contributions. Despite the losses caused by military actions, the city's situation improved after Frederick William switched sides to the anti-Swedish coalition. Trade routes with Polish and Brandenburgian lands were revived. The city suffered immense losses due to fires and epidemics. The biggest fire occurred in 1658, consuming the entire southwest part of the city. Among the buildings destroyed was the St. Mary's Church. Another fire in 1668 once again devastated most of the city. Commemorating these events was the annual ceremony called the "Festival of Fire", which was observed in Gryfice until the 18th century. In the 17th century, the city expanded with the addition of suburbs, Kamień Pomorski and Trzygłów, allowing the residents to diversify their sources of income. Gryfice was known as a city associated with overseas trade, but the production of linen textiles played a more significant role, for which Gryfice was also renowned.

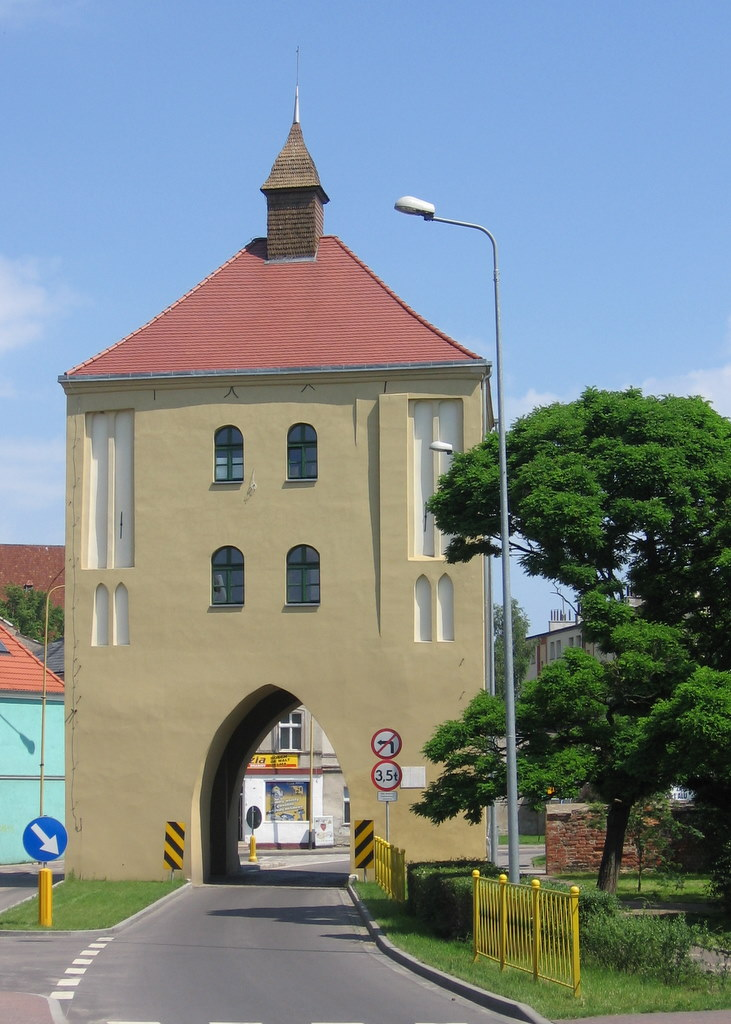
High Gate in Gryfice

In 1699, the distinguished historian Friedrich von Dreger was born in Gryfice. He published over 3,200 publications and documents related to the history of Pomerania, which were collected in a collection called Codex Pomeraniae Diplomaticus, commonly known as the Dreger Codex. The publisher died early, in 1750.

After 30 years of peace in Gryfice, Russian soldiers appeared. Along with the troops of Peter the Great, Polish and Saxon soldiers of Augustus II the Strong passed through Gryfice. This 9-year period of warfare led to the re-devastation of the city. The municipal system was reformed in 1713, with many aspects of city life subordinated to military commissariats. In 1723, the Gryfice County was established. It was one of 19 counties directly subordinate to the Military Chamber and Royal Domains. As part of the administrative reform, there was a slight change in the city's name from Griffenberge to Greiffenberg.

In the second half of the 18th century (during the Seven Years' War), the city was occupied three times by the forces of Empress Elizabeth of Russia. In 1761, there was a concentration of Prussian forces (about 12,000 soldiers) between Gryfice and Karlino. They were confronted by a Russian corps (about 35,000 soldiers). The battle took place under the walls of the city of Gryfice. Artillery bombardment destroyed numerous fortifications and caused fires in the city itself. After the surrender of the Prussian garrison, the city was occupied by the Imperial Russian Army until 1762.

In the 18th century, there was an economic revival. The city had 2 mills, 2 inns, and derived income from 1000 lans of land, 10 villages, and 5 folwarks. In 1790, a brickworks was built. The cause of the revival was government patents granted to foreign craftsmen (mid-18th century), which encouraged settlement in the Gryfice area and the city itself. Immigrants were granted all municipal and guild rights, free plots for building houses, building materials, hereditary property rights, tax exemptions, interest-free loans, and eventually high earnings. After the establishment of a garrison here in 1714, the officer corps gradually assumed the role of the local patriciate. Woolen fabric weaving factories continued to operate in the city.

== Modern period ==
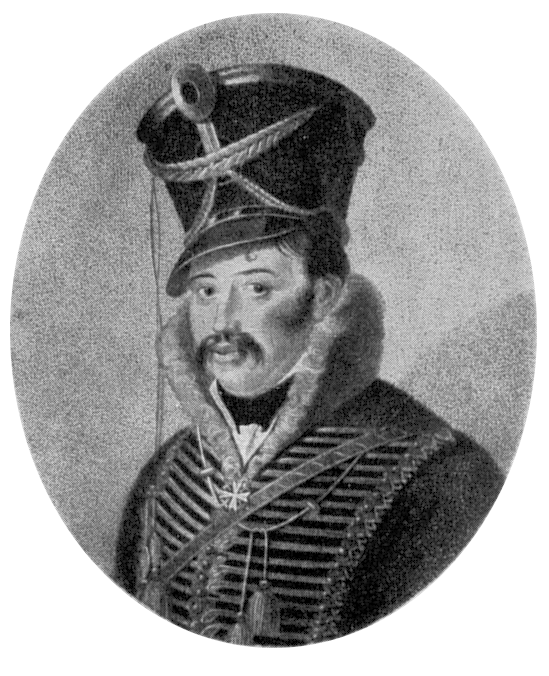
Ferdinand von Schill

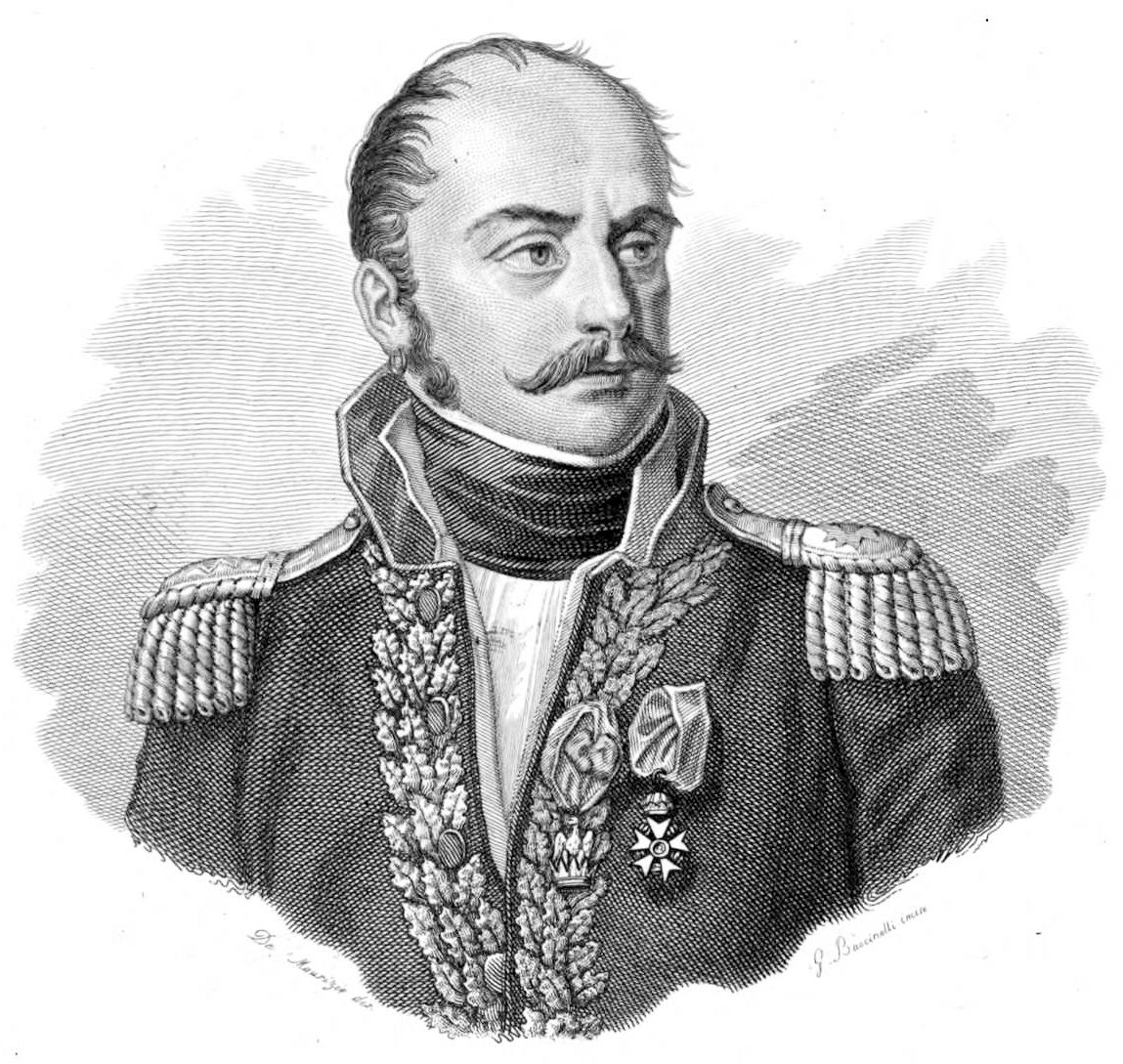
General Pietro Teulié

At the beginning of the 19th century, the city once again found itself in the midst of military actions, this time by Napoleonic France. The Gryfice Landrat von Wrichen began conscripting recruits. This action was interrupted by the appearance of a French detachment, which occupied the city on 8 November 1806. After receiving supplies for the army, the Napoleonic forces left the city and headed eastward. Gryfice then saw the arrival of Ferdinand von Schill's partisan units, who brutally suppressed popular uprisings against the Prussians and conducted terrorist actions. F. von Schill fortified and militarized the city, formed squadrons of "black dragoons", and stationed infantry in Gryfice's fortifications. General Jan Dąbrowski ordered Colonel Franciszek Garczyński to "scatter the rebels", as he referred to Schill's formations. Open conflict only arose when F. von Schill was defeated near Nowogard and when the French-Italian corps of General Pietro Teulié arrived in Gryfice, relieving the Poles. F. von Schill withdrew because he was unable to repel the enemy's overwhelming force. The French committed numerous acts of plunder, robbery, and rape. French troops, numbering 7,000, remained in the city until 14 November 1808.

From the beginning of the 19th century, the population increased to around 3,000 inhabitants. (Note: Pre-World War II data.) This led to the expansion of the city, giving rise to a new district – Gryfice's New Town. Since 1816, as a result of administrative reforms (1815–1818), the city became the seat of a powiat in the Region of Stettin of the Province of Pomerania. (Note: The date 1818, from the completion of the administrative reform, appears in German literature.) The city was renamed Greifenberg in Pommern. In contrast to the former municipium in Gryfice, a municipal self-government was established. Its body was the magisterial college, elected by municipal deputies. The mayor headed the magistrate, assisted by aldermen. The magisterial college dealt with the city's property, regulatory, and patronage matters. Medieval privileges were abolished, and the old guild system and monopolies disappeared. Opportunities for further economic development of the city were created. Trade was revived, and inns and taverns experienced their "golden days". However, the development of productive forces progressed very slowly.

From 1830, the expansion of the school network began. Schools were attended by youth from merchant and artisan families. In addition to the gymnasium established in Gryfice in 1852, named after Frederick William I, (Note: One of the school's first students was Professor Albert Wangerin, a German mathematician, born on 18 November 1844 in Greifenberg/Pommern (today: Gryfice). He graduated from the school in 1862, at which time it acquired the status of a secondary school (German: RealGymnasiums).) two elementary schools operated within the city (the first mention of them dates back to 1811). The first was the Public City School (German: Allgemeine Stadtschule), consisting of 4 boys' and 4 girls' classes, with over 500 children attending. The school was led by a rector with university education, who was also a preacher at the St. Mary's Church. The second elementary school was the "free school" (German: Freischule), with 2 mixed-sex classes, attended by an average of over 150 children.

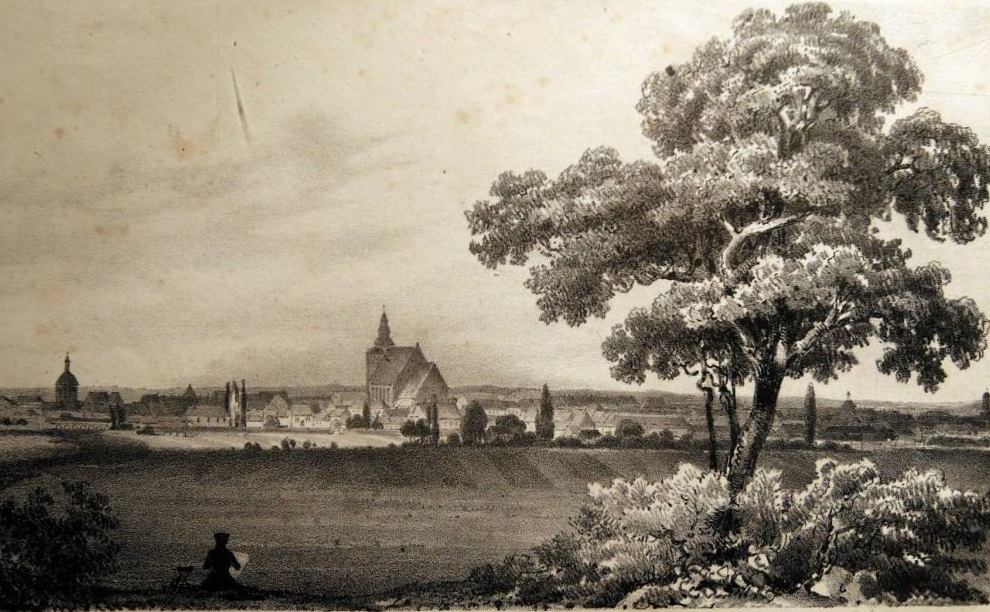
Gryfice in 1846

The cultural life gained momentum through the emergence of associations formed there. In the mid-19th century, the first Gryfice newspapers appeared. In 1843, the Greifenberger Kreisdrucken (published three times a week), in 1867, the Greifenberger Zeitung, and in 1869, the Greifenberger Kreis-Blatt. During the Springtime of Nations, the city and the region seethed with revolutionary events. Alongside the activities of reactionary elements in the Gryfice County, there were also factors supporting the revolution. Economic slogans were raised, and demonstrations were organized to support them. Under Prussian rule, the city descended into the role of a small provincial center. Agricultural economy in the vicinity of Gryfice was also neglected.

In 1862, the city celebrated the 600th anniversary of its municipal rights. Hermann Riemann outlined the monograph of the city, History of the City of Gryfice (German: Geschichte der Stadt Greifenberg in Pommern). (Note: Due to his merits for the city, posthumously one of the streets was named after him. Today it is M. Rodziewiczówna Street. From the topography of the town of Gryfice in 1930.) There was increased interest in archaeology, leading to the discovery of a "treasure" – large coins buried during the pre-Colonial period of the city. In the 1870s, graves from the Lusatian culture period were discovered near Polesin. Historical artifacts and former city fortifications were saved from demolition. The city's architecture still features half-timbered buildings. Only a few residents built their villas on the outskirts of the city. In the latter half of the 19th century, a synagogue (Note: In 1880, the Jewish community of Gryfice numbered 146 people, and there was a Jewish cemetery in the town in addition to the synagogue.) (Note: Frederick William III promulgated an edict in 1812 that granted the Jewish population full equality. All restrictions on Jews in Prussia were canceled, and they became full citizens of the state, formally equal with others. In addition, they were given the freedom to settle freely in all localities, the freedom to choose a profession, and to acquire and own any property.) and a half-timbered church of St. John (German: St. Johanniskirche) were built. The church was demolished decades later. A new neo-Gothic brick church was built on its site (today, Nowy Świat Street) between 1911 and 1913.

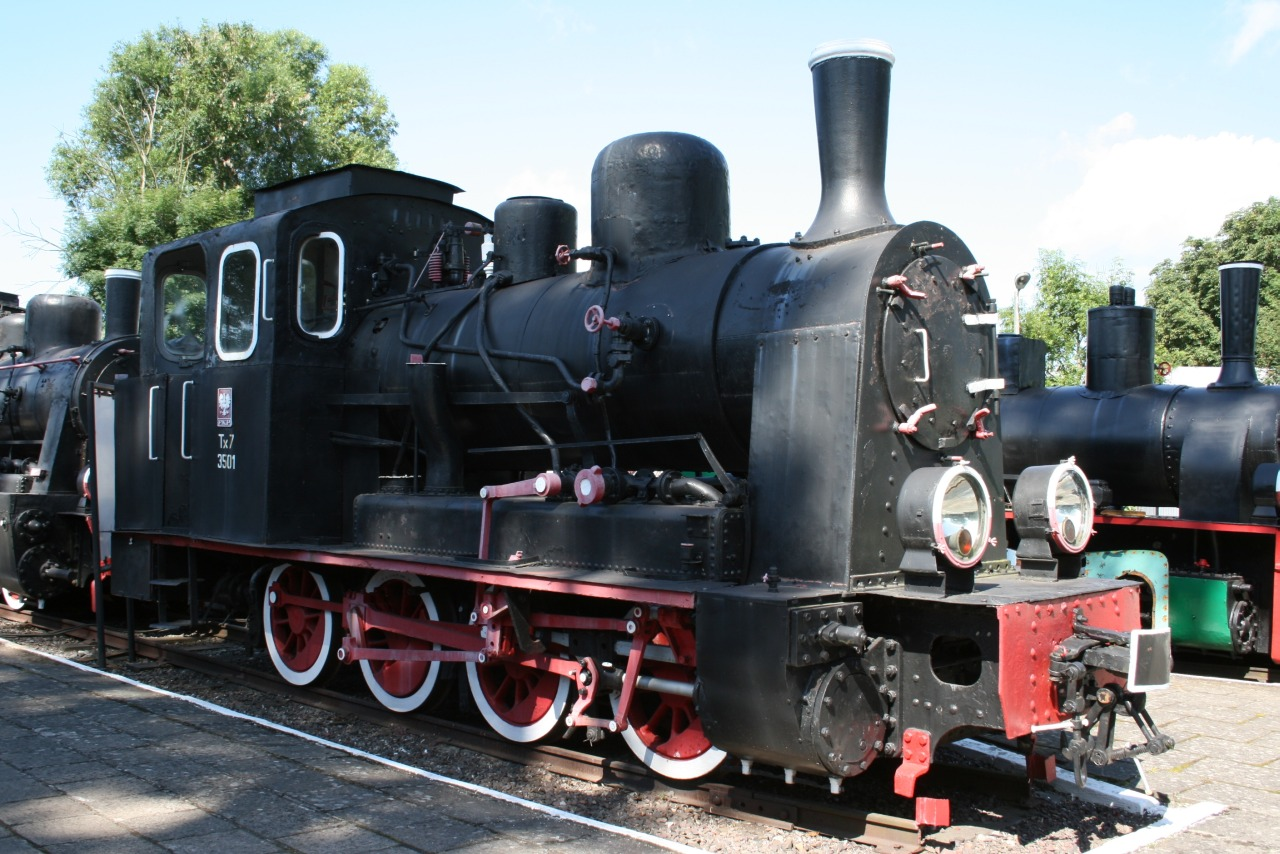
Tx7-3501 steam locomotive at the Permanent Exhibition of Pomeranian Narrow Gauge Railways in Gryfice

Only the turn of the 19th and 20th centuries brought further economic development to the city. Within its territory, a sugar refinery, a ceramic and furnace products factory, a starch factory, and a marmalade factory were built. In 1882, Gryfice gained rail connection with the construction of the Dąbie–Kołobrzeg line, significantly facilitating the transport of agricultural products to larger cities and ports. In 1896, the construction of the first narrow-gauge railway line through Popiele to Niechorze was completed. Two years later, the line to Dargosław via Tąpadły was opened. In 1901, a newly built line connected Gryfice with Golczewo, and in 1913, a railway to Kołomąć was launched. Both lines had a track gauge of 750 mm, which was changed to 1000 mm in 1900. In 1911, a reinforced concrete bridge was put into use, connecting the city center with the right bank of the city.

The early 20th century was marked by the discovery of princely kurgans in nearby Lubieszewo (from 1908 to 1925), classified as part of the so-called prince graves of the Lubieszewo group from the 1st century BCE to the 2nd century CE (Gustow group).

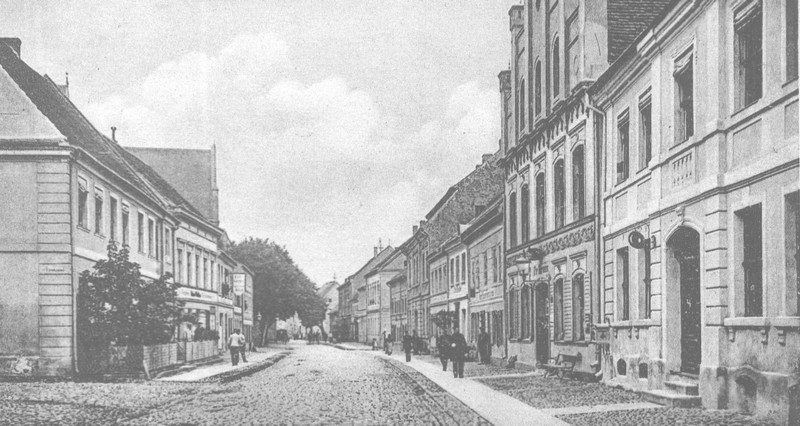
The buildings on Wojska Polskiego Street in 1910

Despite the intensified emigration of Gryfice's population to overseas countries and more developed centers, the city continued to develop economically in the period preceding the outbreak of World War I. In 1913, the population exceeded 7,300. Workers flowed into Gryfice, finding employment in the local sugar refinery and surrounding estates. Their number reached several hundred. During World War I, the city was attributed with economic growth. Sparse data from those years do not allow to determine the extent and areas of social life in which this growth occurred; however, historiography suggests that it was primarily in the agricultural sector.

== Interwar period ==
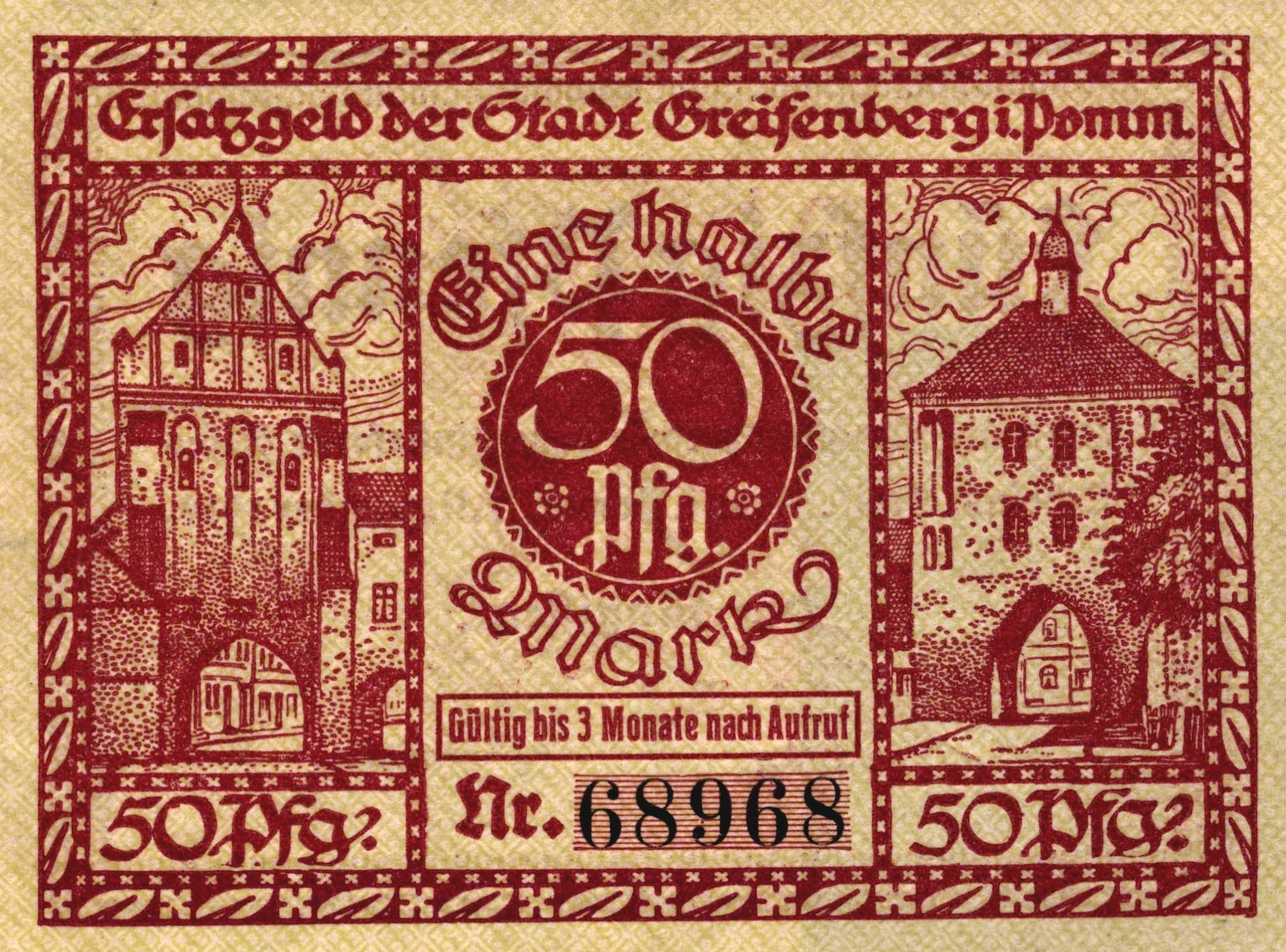
Gryfice's notgeld from 1919

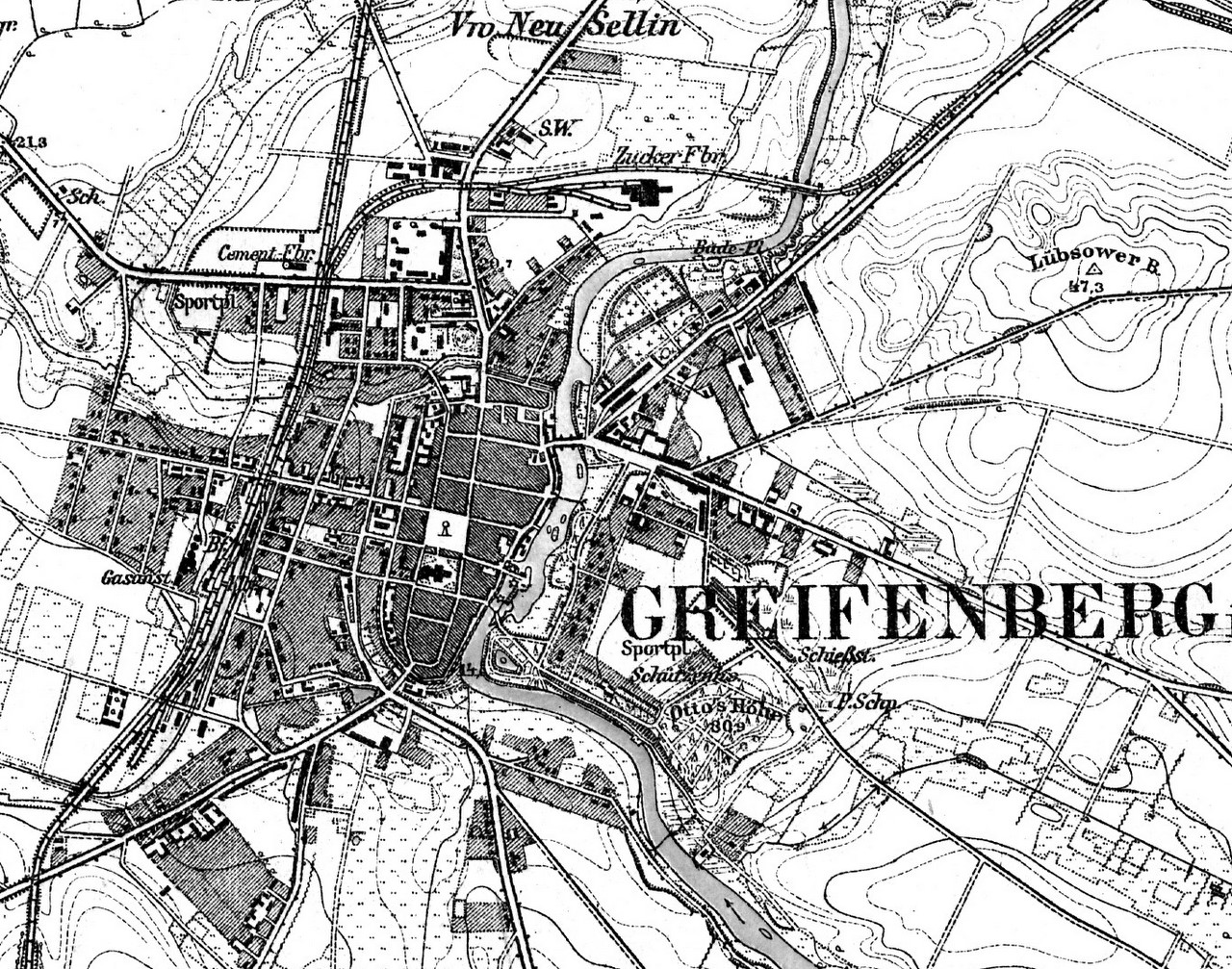
Plan of Gryfice from 1929

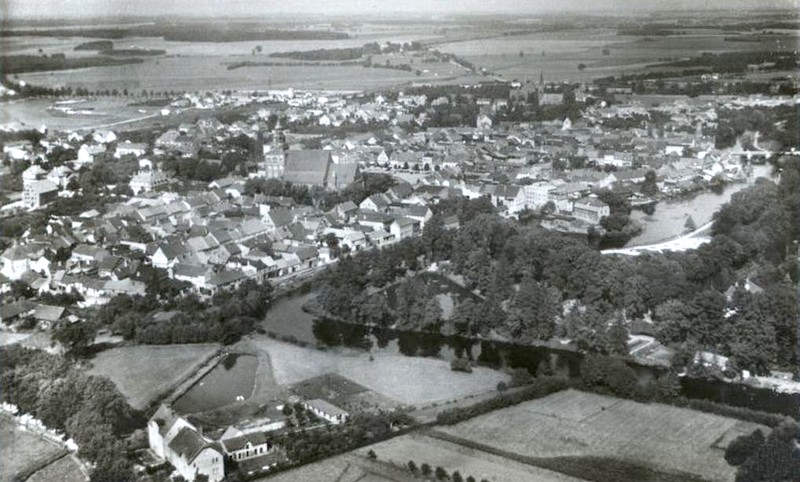
Panorama of Gryfice in 1940

In the years 1919–1920, authorities became concerned about revolutionary movements among the urban and rural proletariat. A two-day strike in Trzebiatów in June 1919 resonated widely in Gryfice. Acts of terror, murders, and rapes occurred in surrounding villages. After the suppression of the revolution, a new period of Prussian rule ensued, represented by the Junker class.

In 1932, a new Catholic church was built in Gryfice, on today's Nowy Świat Street. The painting of Our Lady of Częstochowa, consecrated there on 16 November 1932, was a gift from Polish seasonal workers. (Note: This church was the only Catholic church in a radius of about 50 km. Today it is dedicated to the Sacred Heart of Jesus in Gryfice.) Permits for seasonal work for Polish workers were gradually restricted. In their defense, a Polish union of agricultural workers was established there in 1933.

After Adolf Hitler came to power in Germany and the Nazi Party won local government elections, Nazi Party members occupied leadership positions in the Gryfice administration. The so-called Kreisleitung of the Nazi Party (district leadership) in Gryfice consisted of 25 units managing district affairs. The headquarters were located in Trzebiatów. Gryfice lost its role as the district seat. At the head of the bureaucratic machinery in Gryfice was Landrat von Holstein (subordinate to Kreisleiter F. Ohm).

The actions of the Nazi Party were directed against the Jewish population living in the city. In 1933, there were only 68 Jews in Gryfice. Their number had been gradually decreasing since the mid-1920s. Individuals of Jewish faith were harassed through police surveillance of Jewish organizations and individuals. In 1935, they were deprived of their civil and public rights. (Note: In 1935, the Nuremberg Laws on Reich Citizenship and the Protection of German Blood and German Honor were passed. These laws effectively deprived the Jewish population of their public and civil rights.)

Intensification of agriculture and expansion of military facilities began. The Nazis established labor service formations (Reichsarbeitsdienst) and a district peasant association (Kreisbauernschaft), and credit facilities were launched. Efforts were made to counteract the so-called "flight from the East" of peasants and workers. The party's revisionism was directed against employed Poles. On one hand, there were fears of "Slavs" seasonally employed in the city and its surroundings, but on the other, the necessity of economic development led to changes in attitude towards this issue. However, numerous repressive actions against local Polish activists and employees of the Polish consulate who visited the city were noted in Gryfice itself.

The 1930s brought significant changes to the media market. Newspapers that had been published up to that point collapsed. The developing propaganda of the Nazi Party began extensive cooperation with the Kreiszeitung für den Kreis Greifenberg (from 1935 onwards), which served as the propaganda mouthpiece of the local Nazi Party.

During the interwar period, there were two major industrial plants here – a potato flake factory and a sugar refinery. There was also a factory for fruit processing and a cement plant, and the textile industry center was developing. As a result of industrial development, the city simultaneously increased its population. During the last German census, Gryfice had 10,805 inhabitants. In 1938, as a result of administrative changes related to the incorporation into the new administrative region of Pomerania in Piła, Gryfice was annexed to the Region of Köslin. This situation lasted until 1945.

In 1938, the liquidation of Jewish property intensified, known as "Aryanization". (Note: Aryanization (German: Arieserung) meant hostility and dislike of Jews and admiration for Adolf Hitler.) The synagogue on Poetensteig Street (now 3 Maja Street) was taken over by the Nazi Party during the so-called Kristallnacht. (Note: The synagogue was closed after the so-called Kristallnacht and used as warehouses. The building was demolished on 30 January 1986.) (Note: From the topography of the city of Gryfice in 1930.) At the same time, the Jewish cemetery located on Turnerstraße Street (now Sportowa Street) was destroyed and liquidated. After November 1938, the Nazi authorities began the forced purchase of Jewish properties and shares in companies, which, according to the law, passed into non-Jewish hands or became state property.

As part of the preparations for war, food reserves were organized in Gryfice, intensifying agriculture to the limit of its capabilities. In the eve of the war, units of the Wehrmacht were concentrated here, forming part of Army Group North, commanded by General Field Marshal Fedor von Bock.

== World War II and the capture of the city ==
On 1 September 1939, World War II began, once again changing the face of the city. After the end of the September Campaign, a greater number of prisoners were brought to Gryfice and employed in the city and its surroundings. Following them, larger numbers of inhabitants from the General Government began to arrive along the Rega river, seized in street roundups and forcibly recruited from the Kielce and Lublin regions. They were employed on the rural estates near Gryfice and in the industry within the city.

From mid-1943 onwards, residents from areas threatened by air raids began to arrive in Gryfice. The city was not a target of such attacks as it was located in a purely agricultural area and had no strategic significance. From January 1945 onwards, massive migrations of the German population began. Gryfice lay on one of the three main routes used by organized evacuation convoys and groups of disoriented refugees from the east.

On 1 March 1945, as part of the East Pomeranian offensive, Soviet troops from the 1st Belorussian Front began to attack the German Army Group Vistula, which defended Pomerania. The alarm in Gryfice was only announced on the night of March 4–5, 1945. In the midst of great confusion, mass evacuation from the city began. Not everyone managed to leave the city. Although the escape had been ongoing since March 2, all narrow-gauge trains and military vehicles were overcrowded. About 6,000 people remained in Gryfice, hiding in their homes. The decision was made to surrender the city without a fight, although the Military City Commandant reported preparations for defense.

On March 5, around 3:00 PM, the first units of the 5th Independent Guard Motorcycle Regiment (commanded by Lt. Col. Anatol Muraczew) began to appear. There were no regular battles at that time because German units were leaving the city in panic, and the remaining inhabitants of Gryfice were afraid for their lives. On that day, the Soviets executed about 30–40 people. Battles with German units only occurred on March 7 when German soldiers attacked the city from the direction of Smolęcin. They fought on the eastern outskirts, then in the area of the sugar refinery and barracks, towards Trzebiatów.

German troops (commanded by Colonel Joachim Hesse and Major Fritz Sann) were completely driven out of the city in the afternoon. The 30 Soviet soldiers and 13 Polish soldiers killed in the fighting were buried in two graves in the Gryfice market square. Civilian population also took part in the fighting and was shot by Soviet troops alongside the prisoners.

On March 8, around 7:00 PM, soldiers from the 1st Independent Warsaw Cavalry Brigade appeared in Gryfice. As Polish units entered Gryfice, the city was still burning. The fires were started by the Russians (including throwing grenades into buildings, pouring gasoline and oil on tenements), and at that time the entire Old Town was on fire, and 318 objects were burnt down. During the occupation of the city, soldiers committed numerous rapes, murders, and robberies against the civilian population. As a result of the fighting, the city was 40% destroyed.

From March 9 to April 9, 1945, Gryfice was the headquarters of the First Polish Army. From here, battles of Polish units for Kołobrzeg were directed, among other operations. The military command of the Soviet Union took over power.

== Polish Gryfice ==
=== Between 1945 and 1950 ===
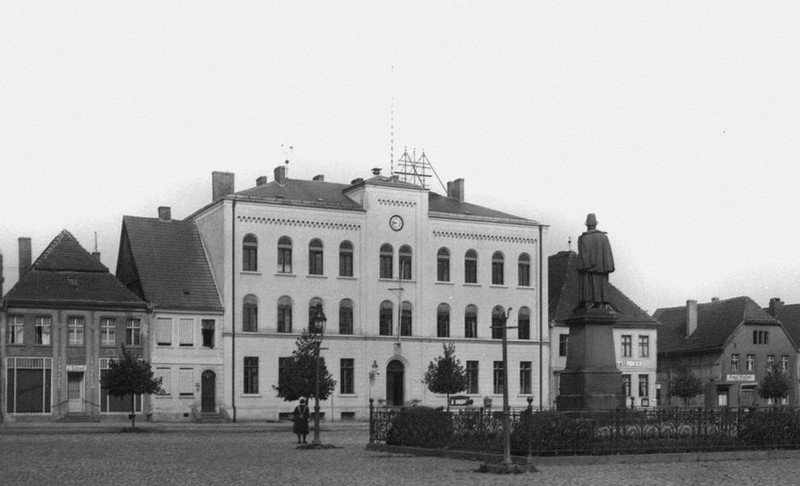
City Hall building in 1938

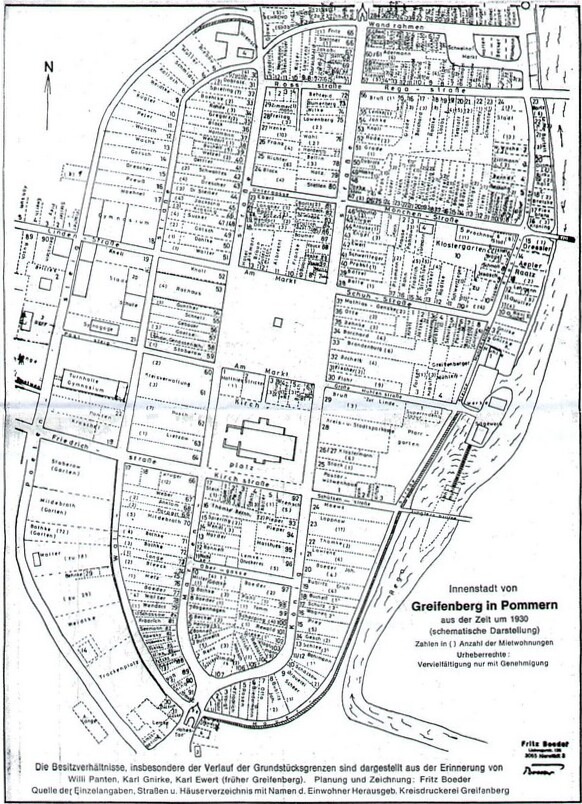
Plan of the Old Town (Gryfice) from 1930

Soviet military commandant Major Łukin, a few days after the city was captured, began to organize Polish administration using local Poles who were brought back to Gryfice from forced labor or returning from Germany. Mieczysław Tacher was appointed mayor. After his resignation on 1 April 1945, Wacław Brustmen was nominated, but the mayor's authority was limited. The poor security situation prompted the commandant to establish a Polish municipal militia. The final abolition of the Soviet military command in Gryfice occurred on 12 July 1945, which, in turn, led to a deterioration in public security (improvement occurred a few months later, with the establishment of the District Public Security Bureau in September 1945). From June 1945 to June 1946, Polish authorities temporarily used the name Zagórze for the city.

Despite the lack of an international decision regarding the lands beyond the Oder river and the Baltic Sea, the Government Plenipotentiary Office for the Western Pomerania Region formed an administrative operational group for the Zagórze district. Kazimierz Borzęcki was appointed as the government plenipotentiary (starosta). The group arrived in Gryfice on 18 May 1945. A few days later, the provincial command of the Citizens' Militia sent 10 officers to the city. According to the starosta's report, there were about 4,000 Germans and 150 Poles in the city, mainly from Mogilno. Three months after W. Brustmen's appointment, Tadeusz Radomski was appointed deputy mayor, effectively leading the city council's work. In agreement with the military commandant, the Deutschenrat (under Polish office control) was established. The city council became a Polish-German body, where most officials were Germans, and Poles held managerial positions. The Polish character of the administration began to emerge only as Polish settlers arrived.

After W. Brustmen's dismissal (he was arrested by the military on June 10), the mayor became Płóciewniczak, who chaired the Gryfice Advisory Council, one of the few established in Western Pomerania. Its main tasks included ensuring the increase and consolidation of Polish ownership (suspended in September, reactivated in January 1946 on different principles). On 25 September 1945, Eugeniusz Zych was appointed mayor, delegated by Lt. Col. Leonard Borkowicz. He held this position until 18 December 1945, when he was nominated for a similar position in Trzebiatów.

The process of resettling the Polish population to Gryfice began in May 1945. Planned settlement of Polish and trans-territorial settlers took place in October. According to data from December 1945, around 3,600 people had already been resettled to Zagórze. Depatriation of the German population began on 2 August 1945. Some families left voluntarily, departing the city after it was occupied by Soviet troops. The action of forced expulsions ended on 30 July 1948. Further deportations continued under the slogan of "family reunification". According to the census of 31 December 1948, only 13 Germans (0.14% of the city's population) remained in the city. By the end of 1948, Gryfice had become a multi-ethnic city, dominated by Poles with an influx of Ukrainian, Belarusian, and Lithuanian settlers.

In late autumn 1945, central authorities decided to relocate the 1st Warsaw Cavalry Division to Gryfice and transfer the district authorities to Trzebiatów. Due to numerous protests, this decision was revoked. Thanks to this, the city maintained its status as a district center. Since 2 August 1945 (Potsdam Conference), the announcement of the expulsion of Germans caused some of them to voluntarily express their desire to leave. The German residents of the city were expelled by 1946.

The only social representative body was the Inter-Party Consultative Commission. Representatives of various political parties arrived in Gryfice along with the first settlers. Among these parties, the Polish Western Union and the People's Party, later transformed into the United People's Party, were predominant. The District Office of Information and Propaganda oversaw mass propaganda campaigns. The Consultative Commission provided a political direction to the local community, organized social life, and resolved inter-party friction. At the initiative of the commission, numerous social organizations were established, including the Committee for the Care of Demobilized Soldiers, the Committee for the Care of the Graves of Polish Soldiers, and the Society of Friends of the Soldier.

Early on, sports and cultural life were organized. The Zagórze Sports Club was established, featuring several sports sections including football, athletics, volleyball, motorsports, and cycling. Cultural subsections included the Stage Enthusiasts Circle, a string orchestra, a male choir, and a vocal quartet. The Capitol cinema became the focal point for cultural life and also served as the local radio station headquarters.

Polish education in Gryfice began its work on 4 September 1945. Classes were held at the 1st Polish Public Primary School (the former German girls' school building on 3 Maja Street, now Gymnasium No. 2). The school admitted its first 64 students. Soon, the educational base was expanded to include the State Gymnasium and High School established on 12 December 1945. Józef Pańkowski was its organizer and first director. Although the school commenced operations on 1 November 1945, the official approval for the institutions' activities was issued by the education board on 12 December 1945.

In Gryfice, there were the Social Welfare Department (providing care for orphans and war invalids), Polish Red Cross, Social Care Home, a kindergarten, and 2 transit points of the State Repatriation Office. Due to the real threat of an epidemic, a makeshift medical clinic was organized, followed by the opening of a hospital in July 1945.

Gryfice suffered from a severe lack of drinking water, electricity, and gas, so efforts were made to restore these utilities. Communication within the city and with the rest of the country was organized through horse-drawn and motor transport (due to the lack of telephone and telegraph communication). The first telephones started operating at the end of 1945. Communication was improved by launching a narrow-gauge railway in July 1945. The normalization of life in the city was accompanied by the transfer of additional production facilities by the military, including a flakes factory, marmalade factory, mill, and sugar refinery. Craft workshops were established, and a cooperative movement emerged – the Consumers' co-operative, Industrial-Agricultural co-operative, Peasants Mutual Aid Association, and Dairy co-operative, as well as co-operative sectors, known as parceling-settlement co-operatives. As a result of their activities, 253 families settled in the city (1947–1949). The first production cooperatives were established on their land. In June 1946, the municipal authorities once again changed the name of the city from Zagórze to Gryfice.

New residents of post-war Gryfice had to overcome many difficulties in terms of provisioning, accommodation, and communication. However, in the first post-war year, the foundations for the efficient functioning of the city in almost all areas of life were already laid. Local priests also actively participated in this process, providing special assistance to those most in need of support and help. Particularly noteworthy is the activity of the local parish priest, Stanisław Rut, (Note: Father Stanisław Rut (a member of the Congregation of Christ the King), lived from 1910 to 1972. He began his ministry in Gryfice in 1946. He was an organizer of religious life and charitable activities for the poor, and he initiated the establishment of a day-care center for 125 children in 1947. He was repressed and arrested by the communist authorities in the 1950s. He was buried in 1972 at the municipal cemetery in Gryfice.) and the branch of Caritas in Gryfice.

The guidelines from 15 April 1946 for the Recovered Territories initiated the establishment of national councils. Initially, the authorities of the councils belonged to the government's plenipotentiary. In the Gryfice County, the national councils were established at the end of the calendar year. Until their establishment, the function of the national councils was performed by the head of general administration and the Inter-Party Consultative Commission. On 29 September 1946, the County Organizational Committee of the County National Council was established. Its first meeting took place on October 12. The council consisted of 38 councilors. Wacław Wierciński (Polish Socialist Party) was appointed Chairman of the County National Council in Gryfice, and Tadeusz Bedera (Polish Workers' Party) was appointed Vice Chairman. The executive body of the council was the County Department. Three committees worked alongside the council: social control, educational, and budgetary. Zygmunt Pogoda became the first county head in Gryfice. The Municipal National Council in Gryfice was established on 17 December 1946, and the communal councils at the beginning of 1947.

=== Between 1950 and 1970 ===
The infamous events known as the "Gryfice incidents" marked the early 1950s in the history of Gryfice. In 1950, cases of using force to enforce planned grain deliveries from farmers, so-called "kulaks", occurred in the Gryfice County. The aim of these actions was to obtain the required grain supplies and prepare for the collectivization of villages. Party and administrative officials, members of the Union of Polish Youth, public security and police officers, as well as "grain trios" and "youth brigades" (light cavalry brigades), participated in the violation of the rule of law. The involvement of the state administration in the violation of the rule of law involved the so-called "regulation", which included the seizure of land previously legally granted to some farmers in exchange for fallow land (in accordance with directives from county political authorities). The grain trios, with the involvement of the Security Service and the police, conducted unlawful inspections, engaged in theft and vandalism of farmers' property. Pressure was exerted and the so-called "kulaks" were harassed, and in few cases, they were arrested.

Before the climax of the Gryfice incidents in 1951, there were abuses in grain procurement. Farmers were unlawfully deprived of over 7 tons of grain. This collectivization campaign caused a true exodus of peasants from the Recovered Territories and a decrease in agricultural production. After the resolution of the Central Committee of the Polish United Workers' Party on 16 May 1951, condemning the Gryfice events, the situation calmed down, although intimidation and beatings of peasants continued, but not on such a scale. On 25 May 1951, with the involvement of the media, a show trial was held by the Supreme Court, which recognized the grievances of 7 affected farmers. They were ordered to be compensated for the losses they suffered. Another 11 farmers were compensated from a special fund of the Provincial National Council in Szczecin. Party and youth activists involved in the case were expelled from the party and organizations and sentenced to several years in prison.

In the 1950s, new workplaces emerged, including in rural areas. The agricultural cooperative sector quickly expanded. Between 1950 and 1955, there were already 65 co-operatives in the Gryfice County, comprising 1,628 farms covering 18,094 hectares of agricultural land. However, all co-operatives were liquidated in 1957. (Note: They were replaced by agricultural circles. In 1957 there were 7 of them, with 155 members.)

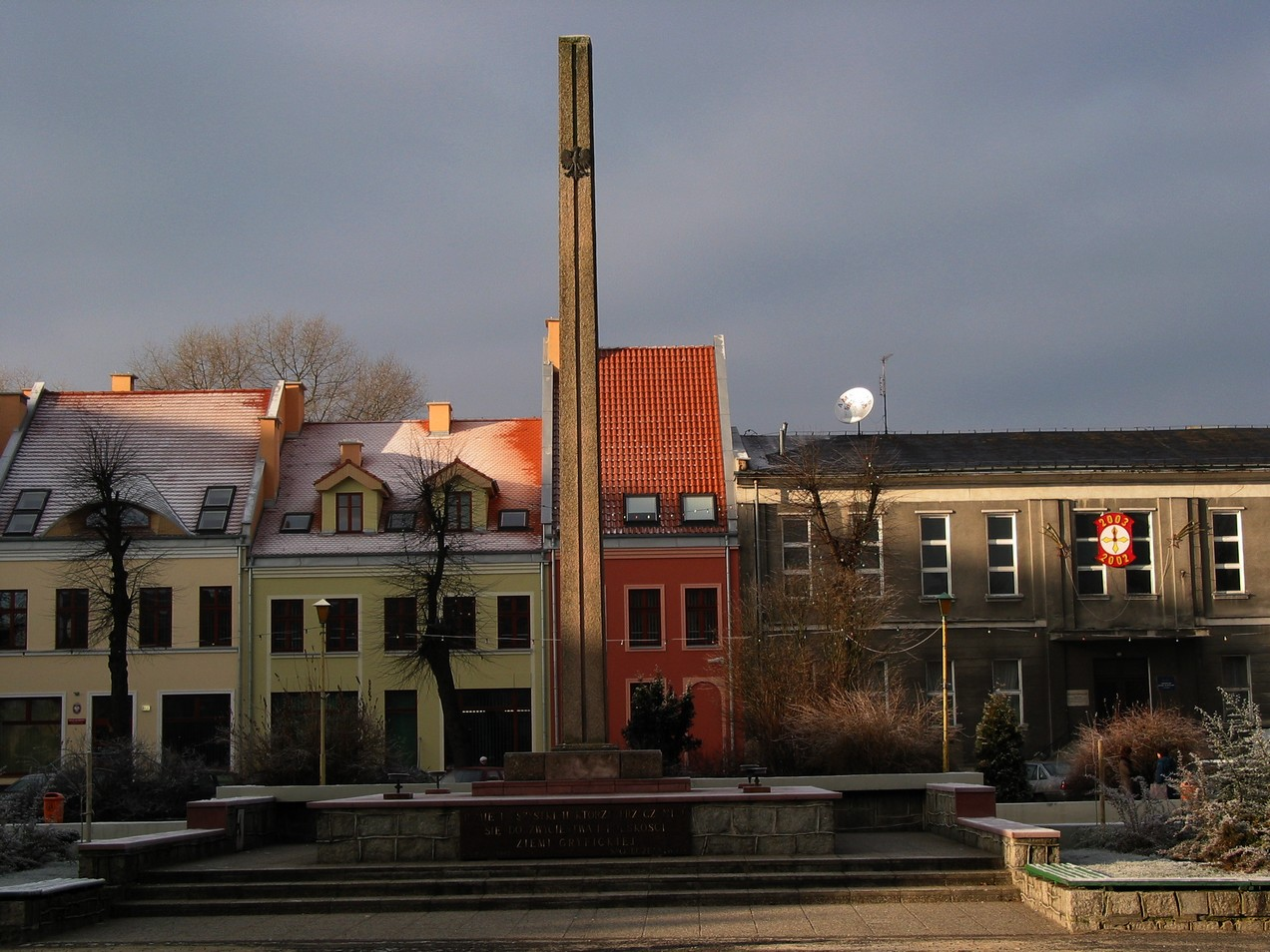
Obelisk on Victory Square in Gryfice (2002)

In 1953, the Victory Obelisk was unveiled in Victory Square, commemorating Soviet and Polish soldiers who died in the battles for the city in 1945.

In 1954, exhumations were carried out of 30 Soviet and 13 Polish soldiers buried in Victory Square from the period of World War II. The remains of the Soviet soldiers were transported to the war cemetery in Kamień Pomorski, while those of the Polish soldiers were taken to Siekierki near Oder river.

The population of the city reached its pre-war level in 1955, with over 10,000 inhabitants. There was an increased demand for new residential premises. Construction of new apartments in Gryfice began in 1958. The new buildings were primarily erected in the city center, where war damage was most severe. The first 2 residential blocks were made available for occupancy in 1960 (by the end of 1965, 1,186 living quarters were put into use).

In the meantime, the Inter-Plant Housing Co-operative Kolejarz was established in 1961, which was transformed four years later into the Nad Regą Housing Co-operative. The first co-operative tenant apartments were built as early as 1967. The co-operative expanded its activities to Trzebiatów and Płoty. By the end of 1975, 9 buildings with 354 residential units were constructed in Gryfice. In 1960 and 1967, two primary schools were built and put into operation (now Primary School No. 3 and Primary School No. 4).

The years 1950–1960 were characterized by significant developmental dynamics, except for the regression in 1956. This regression was influenced by the reduction in population influx and the erroneous economic policy towards small towns (elimination of private trade and craftsmanship).

In 1962, the city celebrated its 700th anniversary of granting municipal rights. Two years later, the Gryfice Cultural Society was established, which mobilized organizationally talented residents to work for the city. The society aimed to disseminate knowledge about the region, organize leisure and recreation, promote culture and support artistic creativity, as well as develop the cultural, educational, tourist, and recreational base. Thanks to many years of efforts and cooperation with the Institute of History at the University of Szczecin, the society has published 4 historical publications titled Ziemia Gryficka (in 1971, 1973, 1987, and 1993). These are the main sources of knowledge about the history of the city and the Gryfice region.

From 1962 to 1966, investments were directed towards mechanizing field work. Approximately 55% of the total expenditure was allocated to mechanization. Special attention was paid to new production co-operatives established as part of the further stage of agricultural co-operativization (such as SP Smolęcin, Łopianów, etc.). Individual farming developed relatively well. In 1966, the Agricultural Construction Company was established. This allowed for the allocation of more funds for construction and assembly investments, implementation of the housing construction program, construction of livestock buildings, and other utility buildings. Gryfice received over 10% of the total monetary funds allocated for investments in cities at the provincial level. The city was classified in the I group of urban development.

By the end of 1968, 1,905 living quarters had been put into use, and several hundred more were renovated and rebuilt. There were already 41 industrial plants in Gryfice (including 9 private ones). The largest ones were: the sugar refinery, Industrial Plants of the Local Industry, Gryfice Industrial Plants, the County Co-operative of Multibranch Services, and a tile factory. The city had a sewage network of over 15 km, a water supply network of 6 km, and a gas network of over 21 km. Additionally, it had a hotel, an expanded educational base (4 kindergartens and 4 primary schools, a high school, and an economics technical school).

=== Between 1970 and 1990 ===
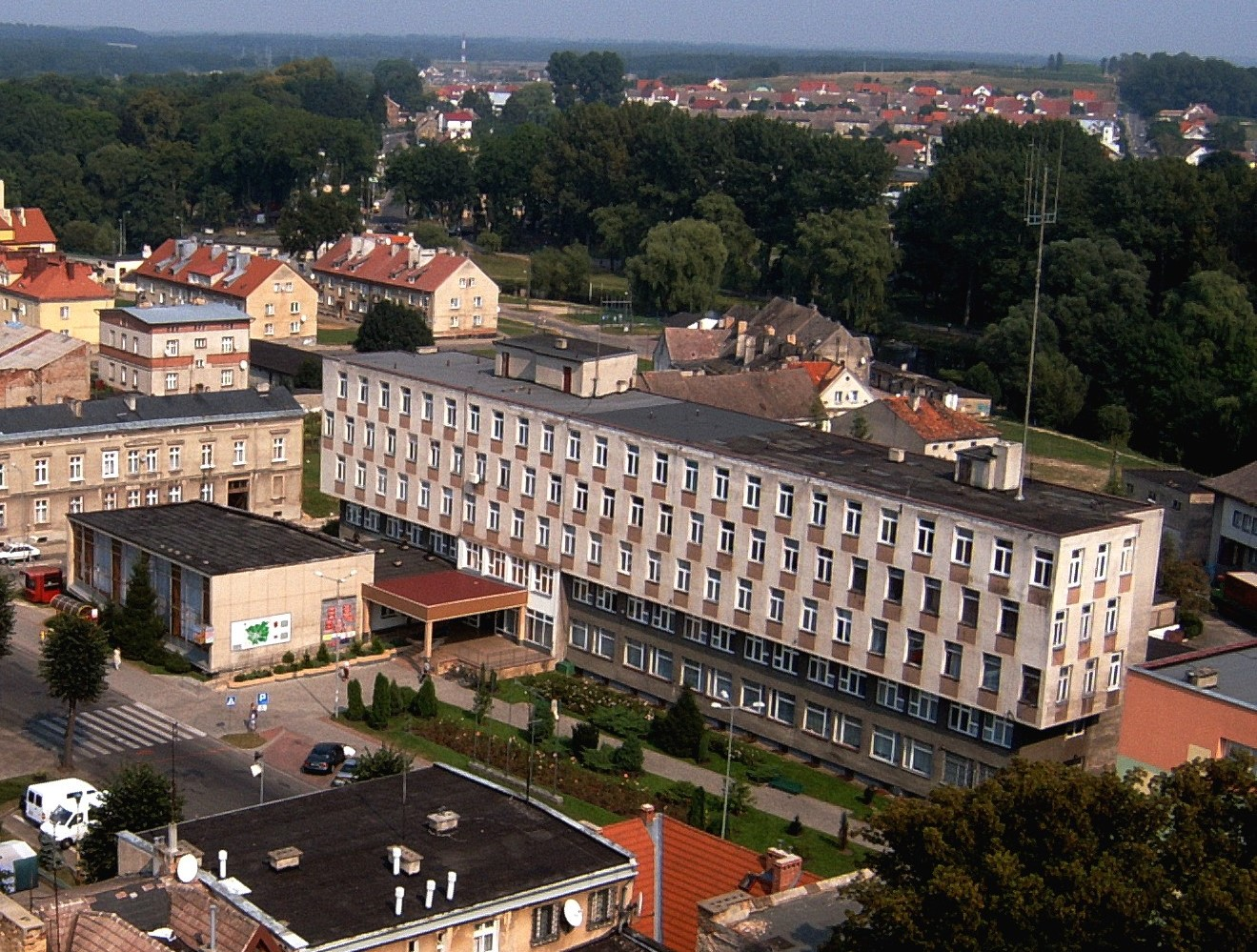
Municipal Office in Gryfice

Since 1970, Gryfice has been the headquarters of the 26th Anti-Aircraft Brigade OPK. In the same year, the current town hall building was put into use. In 1970, thanks to the efforts of the county authorities, a decision was made by the provincial authorities to build a district hospital in Gryfice – a facility with a full profile. The construction investment of the district hospital was entrusted to the Stargard General Construction Company. There was also an increase in funds allocated for major renovations. There was a revival in the individual construction sector.

In Gryfice, youth organizations operated (Polish Scouting and Guiding Association, Union of Socialist Youth, Union of Rural Youth) (since 1976, the last two as Polish Socialist Youth Union, from 1973 to 1981 affiliated with Federation of Socialist Unions of Polish Youth), as well as sports clubs – including sports shooting Baszta, football Sparta, table tennis, competitive cycling, volleyball (in the 1980s), and chess. Numerous organizations, societies, and associations also existed in Gryfice. In 1976, the garrison club with a modern cinema Meteoryt was opened. It was located in the city park, by the Rega river. The club became another center of cultural life in Gryfice (closed in 2003 and demolished a few years later).

The turn of the 1970s and 1980s was a period of worsening economic situation in the country. Informal workers' and employees' unions emerged, showing solidarity with the main centers in the country. They began an open fight against the existing system of power. In defense of workers' rights, the Solidarity trade union was established, joined by a group of oppositionists from Gryfice (including Artur Balazs, an employee of the Seed Center in Gryfice, later interned). Almost all professional groups in Gryfice took part in street protests and strikes.

On 13 December 1981, after the introduction of martial law, tanks, armored vehicles, military patrols, and police appeared on the streets of Gryfice. It marked the beginning of an almost 5-year period of economic stagnation in the city. The lack of basic goods intensified dissatisfaction. The introduction of "food ration cards" aimed to regulate food items and normalize social life. Economic improvement only occurred after 1986.

The construction of the hospital was completed in 1982, and three years later – on 12 April 1985 – a ceremony was held in Gryfice to mark the completion of the investment for the district health care center and to name it after professors Julia and Witold Starkiewicz, pioneers of Gryfice healthcare.

=== Between 1990 and 2010 ===
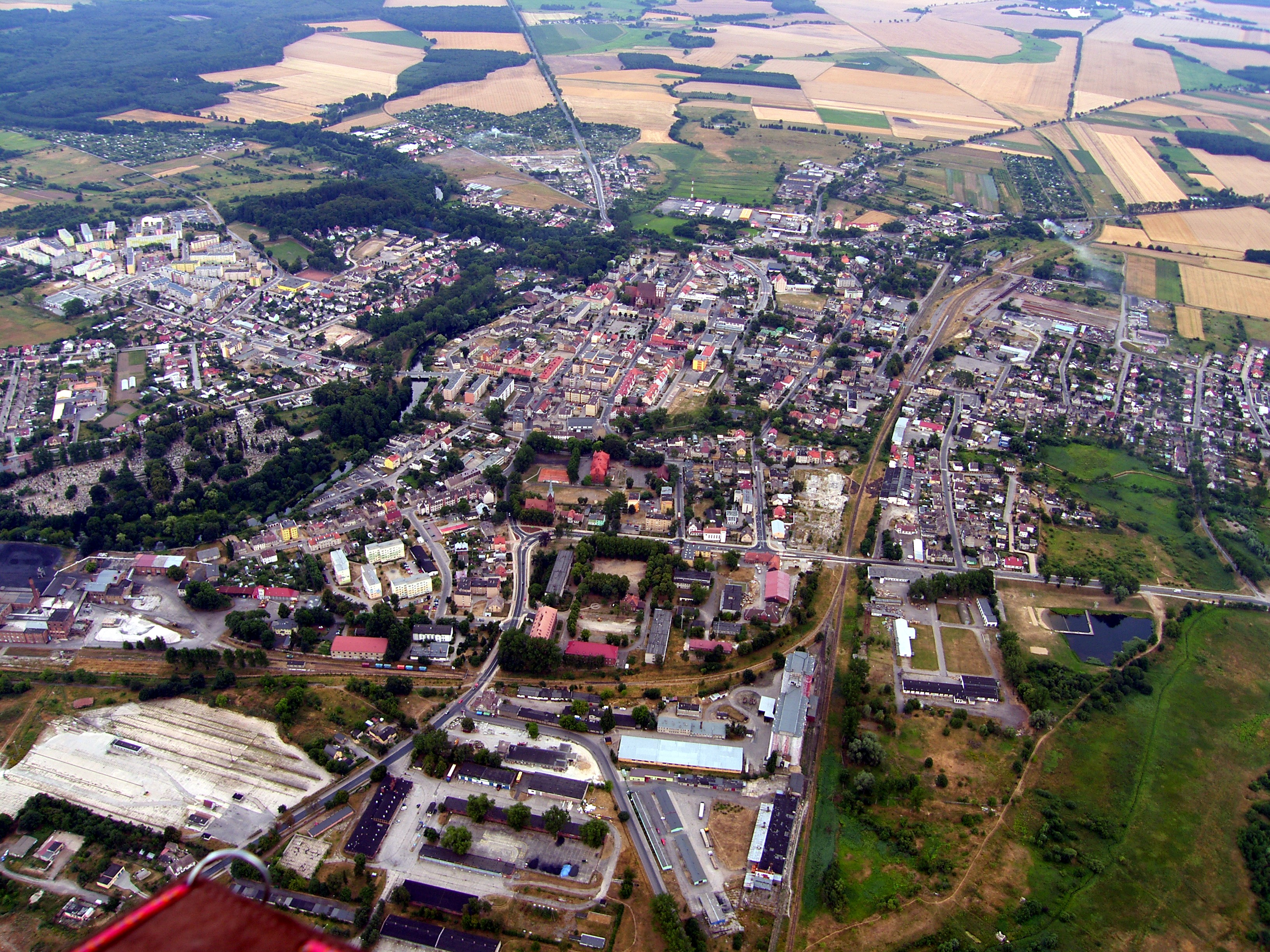
An aerial view of Gryfice in 2007

In the 1990s, a wide-scale development of services, private trade, and small-scale manufacturing began, contributing to the city's growth during the difficult period of state transformation. Many retail and gastronomic outlets went bankrupt, unable to cope with the pace of currency devaluation and high interest rates on bank loans. As a result of the bankruptcy of many post-communist enterprises, massive unemployment emerged, sometimes reaching over 30% of the working-age population (according to data from March 2004–24.3%).

Gryfice became a center for the production of agricultural and food products. The largest production facilities during this period were Gryfice Sugar Refinery and the State Grain and Milling Plants in Gryfice. The city was involved in grain processing and wood processing. Production of acrylic bathtubs began, (Note: Pool SPA (manufacturer of acrylic bathtubs).) as well as paper and hygiene products. (Note: Centrum International (manufacturer of paper and hygiene products).) The rich deposits of peat in the vicinity of Gryfice started to be utilized. The local road transport market and high-tonnage fleet services also expanded. (Note: Expanding the operations of the PKS Gryfice enterprise.)

There was a development of media in Gryfice. New periodical titles emerged, and in 1996, a Catholic radio station – Radio Fala (now Radio Plus Gryfice) was established. The West Pomeranian Regional Television was also founded, broadcasting its program on the cable network.

According to data from the Central Statistical Office from 2008, Gryfice reached its highest population in 1997, with 18,177 inhabitants.

As a result of educational reforms, two secondary schools were established: Secondary School No. 1 named after the Soldiers of the Home Army and Secondary School No. 2 named after Nicolaus Copernicus. An urban amphitheater was built on the Błonia of the City Park after the closure of the inactive fountain and the utilization of some grassy areas.

At the beginning of the 21st century, the bridge made of reinforced concrete connecting the city center with the right bank of the city was reconstructed. The bridge was adorned with four griffins, referring to the history of the city and the House of Griffin lineage of Western Pomerania. (Note: Four griffins adorned the reinforced concrete bridge in its original version. After World War II, they were dismantled and lost. They were found by a local collector of material relics, Jerzy W. Grycmacher, in the nearby village of Trzygłów. They were renovated and restored, after which they were placed on the rebuilt bridge.) At the end of 2001, the military unit was disbanded. Thanks to European Union's funds, the city's monuments were restored (as part of the revitalization of cultural heritage sites), numerous road sections were rebuilt, and traffic flow was improved. A new municipal cemetery was built.

After Poland's accession to the European Union on 1 May 2004, significant emigration of the population from the city and neighboring areas to Western European countries began. (Note: In Gryfice, in January 2004, the number of unemployed people was 2494 (23% of the working-age population), in March 2008, 1432 people (13.2%), i.e. from January 2004 to March 2008 there was a 9.8% drop in unemployment. For comparison: in the Gryfice district, there was a decrease in the number of unemployed by 4326 people (14.8%) in the same period. The data pertains to the registered unemployed. Note: The decline in unemployment is not related to the creation of the number of jobs.) After the dissolution of the military unit, the municipal authorities became interested in spatial development of the barracks area. Public utility institutions and a branch of a higher education institution, the West Pomeranian Business School, were relocated there (at the intersection of Nowy Świat and J. Piłsudski streets). New workplaces were established, and buildings were acquired for communal housing resources.

On the 90th anniversary of Poland's independence regained on November 18, a commemorative stone was ceremonially unveiled. The stone was dedicated to Marshal Józef Piłsudski and was located in the square at 11 Listopada Street, with a plaque (and bust) honoring "Marshal Józef Piłsudski, the reviver of independent Poland". (Note: On December 5, 2007, the Social Committee for the construction of a monument to Marshal Józef Pilsudski was established, on the initiative of Capt. Grzegorz Burcza, chairman of the Association of Friends of Gryfice.) (Note: The base of the monument is formed by a glacial erratic, known as Scandinavian gneiss, weighing 13 tons (created approximately 1.5 billion years ago).)

From 1945 to 1998, the city belonged to the Szczecin Voivodeship, and after the administrative reform of the state in 1999, it became part of the West Pomeranian Voivodeship. Gryfice became the seat of the county again.

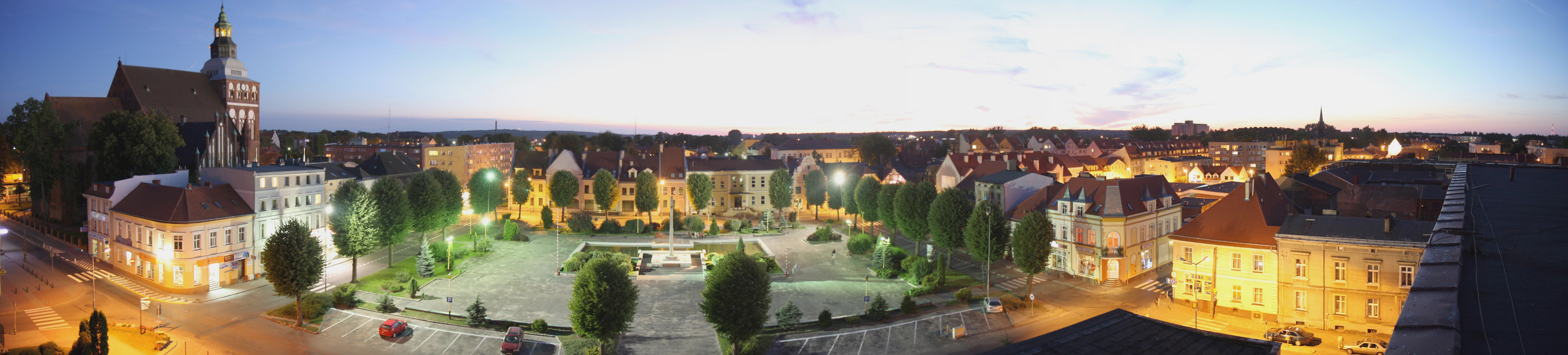
View of Victory Square in the evening (2008)

== Bibliography ==
=== Sources ===
- State Archive in Szczecin. District Office of Information and Propaganda in Zagórze, sign. 1.
- State Archive in Szczecin, Territorial Department of Planning and Communications, Presidium of the District People's Council in Gryfice, Report dated 25.10.1956, Org. No. 90.
- State Archive in Szczecin, Branch in Płoty. Gryfice County Office, sign. 45, 109, 443.
- State Archive in Szczecin, Provincial Office in Szczecin, sign. 109, 443, 776.
- State Archive in Szczecin, Provincial Economic Planning Commission/Provincial Office in Szczecin, annex 1, T. 81, Szczecin 1949.
- Bulletin of the Government Plenipotentiary for the Western Pomerania District 1945, Vol. 3, Szczecin 1945.
- Boeder, F. (1930). Innenstadt von Greifenberg in Pommern aus der Zeit um 1930 – (schematische Darstellung). Greifenberg/Pommern: Kessinger Publishing.
- Deutsche Tageszeitung. Translated by Dopierała, B. 12 April 1920.
- Pańkowski, J. (1987). Pamiętniki Józefa Pańkowskiego, organizatora oświaty w Gryficach w latach 1945–1950.
- Państwowa Straż Ochrony Zabytków (1987). Sprawozdanie za lata 1983–1986. Szczecin: Edyta Gajek.
- Urząd Gminy Gryfice (2004). "Wykaz stanowisk archeologicznych w ramach strefy W. I., AZP: 21-12/8, 19-11/52, 21-11/25, 19-10/49" [List of archaeological sites within the W. I. zone, AZP: 21-12/8, 19-11/52, 21-11/25, 19-10/49]. Plan Rozwoju Lokalnego dla Gminy Gryfice 2004–2006 i 2007–2013 [Local Development Plan for the Gryfice Commune 2004–2006 and 2007–2013] (Report) (in Polish). Gryfice.
- Urząd Gminy Gryfice (2005). Strategia gminy Gryfice na lata 2005–2020 [Gryfice commune strategy for 2005–2020] (Report) (in Polish). Gryfice.
- Office of Information and Propaganda in Zagórze, files L. Dz. og. 57, Zagórze 1945.

=== Online sources ===
- Starostwo powiatowe w Gryficach (SEZAM). "Spisy ludności" (in Polish). Archiwum Państwowe w Szczecinie, Oddział w Płotach. No. 1/0, card A. Archived from the original on 2013-10-29.
- Prümers, R. (1881). Pommerches Urkundenbuch. part I (in Latin). Vol. II. Stettin: Commission bei Th. von der Rahmer.
- Internetowy System Aktów Prawnych. "Rozporządzenia Rady Ministrów z dn. 29 maja 1946 r., w sprawie tymczasowego podziału administracyjnego Ziem Odzyskanych (Dz.U., rok 1946, nr 28, poz. 177)" (in Polish).
- Internetowy System Aktów Prawnych. "Ustawa z dn. 24 lipca 1998 r. o wprowadzeniu zasadniczego trójstopniowego podziału terytorialnego państwa (Dz.U., rok 1998, nr 96, poz. 603)" (in Polish).

=== Studies ===
- Berghaus, H. (1870). Landbuch des Herzogthums Pommern und des Fürstenhums Rügen Enthaltend Schilderung der Zustände dieser Lande in der zweiten Hälfte des 19 Jahrhunderts. part 6. Vol. I, II. Anklam: Dietze.
- Błonko, T. (1971). "Sytuacja gospodarcza w powiecie gryfickim w roku 1945". In Białecki, Tadeusz (ed.). Ziemia Gryficka 1969. Szczecin: Gryfickie Towarzystwo Kultury w Gryficach.
- Bosse, H. (1936). "Schills heldenmütiger Kampf um Naugard". Unser Pommerland. Vol. 7–8.
- Burger, W. S. (1983). "Ludowcy w radach narodowych i administracji Pomorza Zachodniego w latach 1945–1949". Przegląd Zachodniopomorski (1–2). Szczecin.
- Butzlaff, H. (1982). "Geschichte des Friedrich-Wilhelm-Gymnasium in Greifenberg/Pommern". Beiträge zur Greifenberg-Treptower Geschichte (vol. 5). Vol. 1. München: Kaffee - Handels - Aktiengesellschaft HAG, Bremen.
- Cieśliński, A. (1999). Ks. Stanisław Rut (1910-1972) chrystusowiec. Gryfice: Biblioteczka Parafialnego Oddziału Akcji Katolickiej.
- Cieśliński, A. (2001). "Obraz Matki Boskiej powrócił do kościoła". Zeszyty Gryfickie. Gryfice: Gryfice. ISBN 83-917078-0-6.
- Cieśliński, A. (1987). "W 20-lecie Gryfickiego Towarzystwa Kultury – o przeszłości i przyszłości stowarzyszenia". In Kozłowski, K. (ed.). Ziemia Gryficka 1945-1985. Gryfice: Gryfickie Towarzystwo Kultury w Gryficach.
- Czubryt-Borkowski, Czesław; Czarnocki, Zygmunt; Rada Ochrony Pomników Walki i Męczeństwa (Poland), eds. (1988). Przewodnik po upamiętnionych miejscach walk i męczeństwa: lata wojny 1939-1945 (4th ed.). Warszawa: Wydawn. "Sport i Turystyka". ISBN 978-83-217-2709-7.
- Dopierała, B. (1960). "Ostflucht na Pomorzu Zachodnim i jego ekonomiczne oraz społeczne podłoże". In Ślaski, K. (ed.). Pomorze Zachodnie. Nasza ziemia ojczysta. Poznań: Bajki-Grajki.
- Dworaczyk, M. (2010). "Gryfice – stare czy nowe miasto nad Regą? Głos archeologa w dyskusji". In Majewska, A. (ed.). Pomorze wczoraj – dziś – jutro: miasta i miasteczka pomorskie: materiały = Pommern Gestern, Heute, Morgen: pommersche Städte und Städtchen: Materialien. Stargard: Pruszcz Gdański. ISBN 978-83-61508-14-4.
- Dworaczyk, M. (2005). "Od epoki kamienia do okresu rzymskiego". XIV Sesja pomorzoznawcza. part 1. Gdańsk: Muzeum archeologiczne. ISBN 83-85824-27-8.
- Golczewski, K. (1962). "Miasto Gryfice i powiat na przełomie lat 1944–1945". Szczecin, miesięcznik Pomorza Zachodniego (3). Szczecin.
- Hornik, B. (1971). "Węzłowe problemy rolnictwa powiatu gryfickiego". In Białecki, Tadeusz (ed.). Ziemia Gryficka 1969. Szczecin: Gryfickie Towarzystwo Kultury w Gryficach.
- Kantzow, T. (1908). Gaebel, G. (ed.). Pomerania, Eine pommersche Chronik aus dem sechzehnten Jahrhundert. Vol. I. Stettin: Ulan Press.
- Keyser, E. (1939). Deutsches Städtebuch. Vol. I. Stuttgart: Stuttgart.
- Kozaryn, J. (1973). "Przeobrażenia społeczno-gospodarcze powiatu gryfickiego w latach 1946–1968. Próba charakterystyki". In Białecki, Tadeusz (ed.). Ziemia Gryficka 1970-1971. Szczecin: Gryfickie Towarzystwo Kultury w Gryficach.
- Kratz, G. (1865). Die Städte des Provinz Pommern. Berlin: Wentworth Press.
- Labuda, Gerard (1969). "Charakterystyka językowa Pomorza słowiańskiego; zagadnienia jedności językowej Pomorza ze Słowiańszczyzną połabską i Polską". Historia Pomorza. part 1. Vol. I. Poznań: Poznańskie.
- Lasek, S. (1971). "Wybrane problemy życia kulturalnego w powiecie gryfickim w latach 1945–1956". In Białecki, Tadeusz (ed.). Ziemia Gryficka 1969. Szczecin: Gryfickie Towarzystwo Kultury w Gryficach.
- Lachnitt, W. (1947). Pod znakiem Gryfa. Szczecin: Polskie Pismo i Książka.
- Leciejewicz, Lech (1960). Pomorze Zachodnie – Nasza Ziemia Ojczysta. Poznań: Bajki-Grajki.
- Lesiński, H. (1985). "Rozdrobnienie feudalne 1237–1478". In Labuda, Gerard (ed.). Dzieje Szczecina. Vol. II. Warsaw – Poznań: PWN.
- Macholak, J. (1987). "Rok 1945 w Gryficach". In Kozłowski, K. (ed.). Ziemia Gryficka 1945-1985. Gryfice: Gryfickie Towarzystwo Kultury w Gryficach.
- Maliszewska, M. (1987). "Moje miasto". In Kozłowski, K. (ed.). Ziemia Gryficka 1945-1985. Gryfice: Gryfickie Towarzystwo Kultury w Gryficach.
- Marzec, C. (1987). "Bezpośrednie przyczyny i przebieg wydarzeń gryfickich w 1951 roku". In Kozłowski, K. (ed.). Ziemia Gryficka 1945-1985. Gryfice: Gryfickie Towarzystwo Kultury w Gryficach.
- Miklos, S. (1973). "Rolnictwo powiatu gryfickiego w latach 1945–1970". In Białecki, Tadeusz (ed.). Ziemia Gryficka 1970-1971. Szczecin: Gryfickie Towarzystwo Kultury w Gryficach.
- Mitkowski, J. (1946). Pomorze Zachodnie w stosunku do Polski. Poznań: IZ.
- Mościcki, J. (2001). Polska Popielidów. Słubice: Chałupnictwo "Zadra". ISBN 83-915374-0-4. OCLC 69584154.
- Muras, S. (1971). "Partie i stronnictwa polityczne w powiecie gryfickim w latach 1945–1948". In Białecki, Tadeusz (ed.). Ziemia Gryficka 1969. Szczecin: Gryfickie Towarzystwo Kultury w Gryficach.
- Opieka, W.; Podralski, J. (1987). "Dzieje Spółdzielni Mieszkaniowej „Nad Regą" w Gryficach". In Kozłowski, K. (ed.). Ziemia Gryficka 1945-1985. Gryfice: Gryfickie Towarzystwo Kultury w Gryficach.
- Polak, B. (2002). "Cena wygranej". Biuletyn Instytutu Pamięci Narodowej. 1 (12). Warsaw.
- Poniatowska, A.; Drewniak, B. (1961). Polonia szczecińska (1890-1939). Poznań: Poznańskie.
- Rymar, Edward (1986). "Pierwsza wyprawa Stefana Czarnieckiego na Pomorze Zachodnie (1657 r.)". Mówią wieki. 5. Warsaw.
- Rymar, Edward (2005). Rodowód książąt pomorskich. Szczecin: Książnica Pomorska im. Stanisława Staszica. ISBN 83-87879-50-9. OCLC 69296056.
- Rzeszowski, S. (1962). "Ważniejsze momenty dziejów Gryfic". Szczecin, miesięcznik Pomorza Zachodniego (3). Szczecin.
- Rzeszowski, S. (1971). "Z dziejów Gryfic". In Białecki, Tadeusz (ed.). Ziemia Gryficka 1969. Szczecin: Gryfickie Towarzystwo Kultury w Gryficach.
- Sekuła, B. (1965). "Odbudowa i rozbudowa miast i osiedli Pomorza Zachodniego w latach 1945–1965". Przegląd Zachodnio-Pomorski (3). Szczecin.
- Siuchniński, M., ed. (1967). Miasta polskie w tysiącleciu. Vol. II. Wrocław: Życie Warszawy.
- Spors, J. (1988). Studia nad wczesnośredniowiecznymi dziejami Pomorza Zachodniego XII-połowa XIII w. Słupsk: Zachodniopomorski.
- Strzelczyk, J. (2000). Odkrywanie Europy. Poznań: Wyd. Poznańskie. ISBN 83-7177-010-3. OCLC 830260742.
- Szczaniecki, M. (1960). "Ramy terytorialne rozwoju historycznego Pomorza Zachodniego". In Ślaski, Kazimierz (ed.). Pomorze Zachodnie. Nasza ziemia ojczysta. Poznań: Poznańskie.
- Ślaski, Kazimierz (1969). "Nazwy Pomorza i Prus w okresie od 1772 do 1919 roku". In Labuda, Gerard (ed.). Historia Pomorza. part 1. Vol. I. Poznań: Poznanskie.
- Ślaski, Kazimierz (1954). Przemiany etniczne na Pomorzu Zachodnim w rozwoju dziejowym. Prace Instytutu Zachodniego. Poznań: Instytut Zachodni.
- Ulrich, A. (1990). Chronik des Kreises Greifenberg in Hinterpommern. Dötlingen: Woedtke, Selbstverl. d. Verfassers.
- Wachowski, K.; Labuda, G. (2000). Słowiańszczyzna Zachodnia. Poznań: Wyd. PTPN. ISBN 83-7063-271-8. OCLC 749228272.
- Wehrmann, M. (1927). Geschichte von Land und Stadt Greifenberg (Kreis Greifenberg). Greifenberg/Pommern: Weichert.
- Wehrmann, M. (1992). Geschichte von Pommern. Vol. 2. Augsburg: Lindenbaum Verlag. ISBN 3-89350-112-6.
- Wołągiewicz, Ryszard (1994). Lubieszewo, Materiały do studiów nad kulturą społeczności Pomorza Zachodniego w okresie od IV w. p.n.e. do I w. n.e. Szczecin: Muzeum Narodowe.
- Wołągiewicz, Ryszard (1971). "Z badań archeologicznych w Lubieszewie nad osadnictwem w późnej starożytności i wczesnym średniowieczu". In Białecki, Tadeusz (ed.). Ziemia Gryficka 1969. Szczecin: Gryfickie Towarzystwo Kultury w Gryficach.
- Wesołowska, S. (2001). "Szkic do dziejów szkolnictwa w Trzebiatowie od XIV wieku do czasów współczesnych". In Łysiak, W. (ed.). Trzebiatów – historia i kultura II. Poznań: Eco. ISBN 83-87437-08-5.
- Wiśniewski, J. (1985). "Początki układu kapitalistycznego 1713–1805". In Labuda, G. (ed.). Dzieje Szczecina. Vol. II. Warsaw – Poznań: Państwowe Wydawnictwo Naukowe.
- Witczak, K. T. (1993). "Dwa studia nad Geografem Bawarskim". Kwartalnik Historyczny. LIX.
- Wróblewski, T. (1960). "Etnograficzny zarys Pomorza Zachodniego". In Ślaski, K. (ed.). Pomorze Zachodnie – nasza ziemia ojczysta. Poznań: Poznańskie.
- Żak, P. (2007). "Gryfice i Trzebiatów w latach II wojny światowej. Zajęcie miast przez Armię Czerwoną". In Kochanowska, J. (ed.). Trzebiatów – spotkania pomorskie – 2006 r. Wołczkowo near Szczecin: In Plus. ISBN 978-83-89402-50-9.
- Żukowski, M. (1987). "Informacje o powstaniu i działalności zespołu opieki zdrowotnej w Gryficach". In Kozłowski, K. (ed.). Ziemia Gryficka 1945-1985. Gryfice: Gryfickie Towarzystwo Kultury w Gryficach.

=== Online studies ===
- "Emigracja Polaków w latach 2004–2006". eGospodarka.pl. Archived from the original on 2015-04-02.
- "Opis miasta Gryfice". ePolska.pl. Archived from the original on 2008-12-11.
- Lahitte, J. "Cmentarze żydowskie w Polsce. Gryfice".
- Mieczkowski, J. "Z dziejów Żydów na Pomorzu Zachodnim". Archived from the original on 2015-06-21.
- Opęchowski, M. "Cmentarze żydowskie na Pomorzu Zachodnim. Stan zachowania, problemy konserwatorskie". part 1. Archived from the original on 2016-05-04.
- "O stanie bezrobocia". Powiatowy Urząd Pracy w Gryficach. Archived from the original on 2008-09-09.
- Rajman, J. (2009). "Grody kasztelańskie a średniowieczne miasta (z genezy pomorskich miast)". Słupskie prace geograficzne nr 6 (PDF). Archived from the original (PDF) on 2011-07-07.
- Riemann, Hermann (1862). Geschichte der Stadt Greifenberg in Pommern: eine Gedächtnissschrift zum sechshundertjährigen Jubiläum der Stadt (in German). Greifenberg/Pommern: Toepler.

=== Press studies ===
- Bieniek, D. (1999). "Marzec 1945 w Gryficach i okolicy". Okazjonalny Magazyn Historyczny, Dwutygodnik Gryficki. Gryfice.
- Jarząb, W. "Historie miasta Greifenberg". Gryfickie Echa (12 (2006), 17-22 (2008)). Gryfice.

=== Online press studies ===
- "Prawosławna Parafia Zaśnięcia Przenajświętszej Bogurodzicy w Gryficach". Strona oficjalna gryfickiej cerkwi.
