= Smolęcin, Gryfice County =

Smolęcin
- Village
- Location within Poland
- Coordinates: 53°52′27″N 15°14′24″E
- Country: Poland
- Voivodeship: West Pomeranian
- County: Gryfice
- Gmina: Gryfice

Smolęcin [smɔˈlɛnt͡ɕin] (German: Schmalentin) is a village in the administrative district of Gmina Gryfice, within Gryfice County, West Pomeranian Voivodeship, in north-western Poland. It lies approximately 6 km (4 mi) south-east of Gryfice and 67 km (42 mi) north-east of the regional capital Szczecin.

Before 1637 the area was part of Duchy of Pomerania. For the history of the region, see History of Pomerania and History of Gryfice.
