= Gryfice incidents =

1950s scandals in Poland

The Gryfice incidents were events in the early 1950s in the Gryfice County, concerning abuses of power by the authorities against farmers during a planned grain purchase campaign. The abuses were not limited to Gryfice County.

In 1950, there were cases of coercion in Gryfice County during the enforcement of planned grain deliveries from farmers – the so-called kulaks. The aim of these actions was to obtain adequate agricultural quotas and prepare for the collectivization of the countryside. Employees of the Polish United Workers' Party and administrative officials, activists of the Union of Polish Youth, officers of the Security Office and the Citizens' Militia, as well as "grain trios" and "youth brigades" (light cavalry brigades) participated in the violation of the law. Between 1948 and 1956, the political authorities of the time emphasized that the basis for the collectivization of the countryside was the principle of voluntary association. Economic coercion, administrative and political pressure, including criminal repression, were used. The events ended with a show trial on 25 May 1951 in Gryfice.

== Collectivization of the Gryfice countryside ==
=== From the Cominform to the Episcopate ===
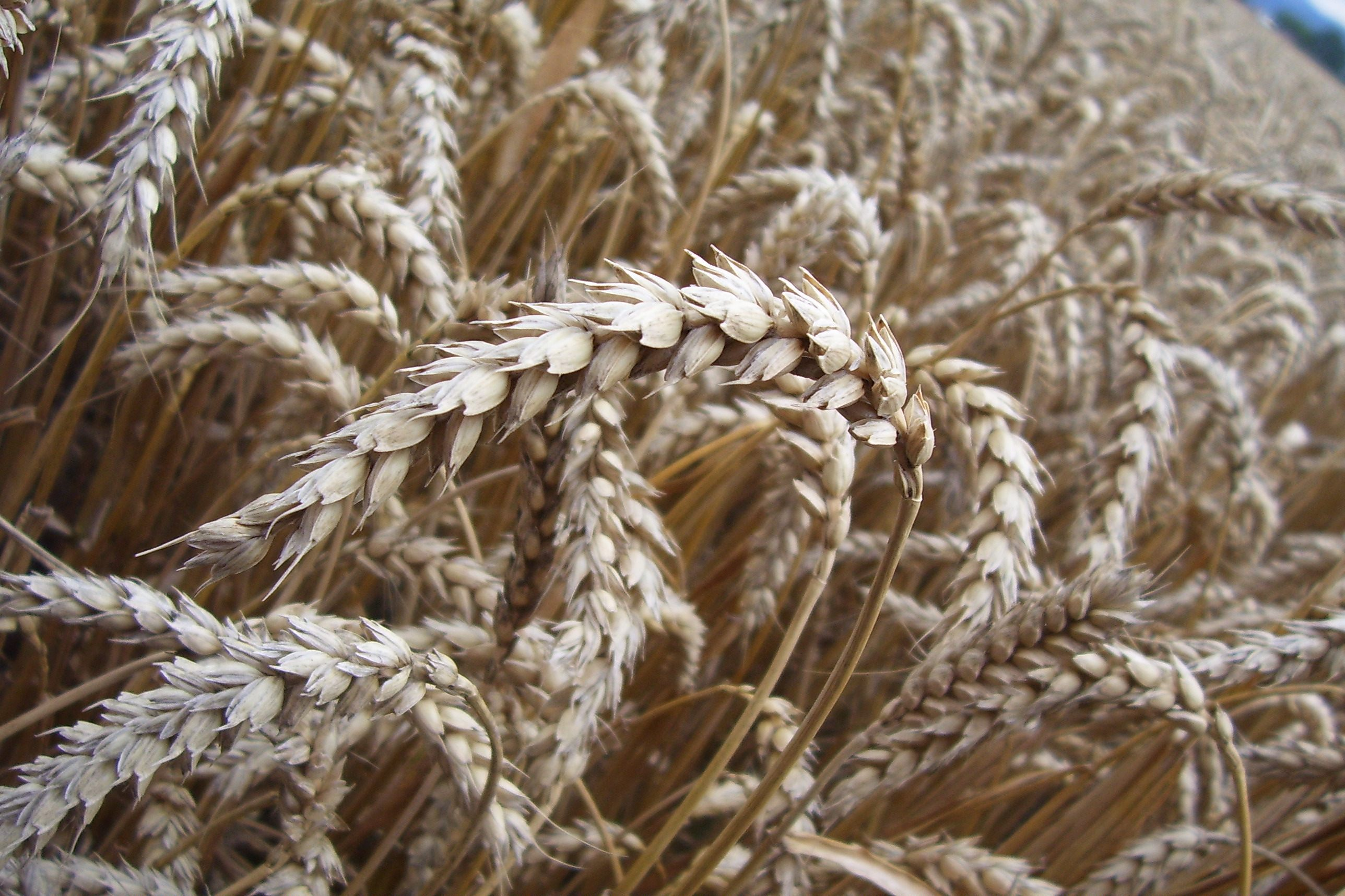
Wheat, one of the grains subject to compulsory deliveries

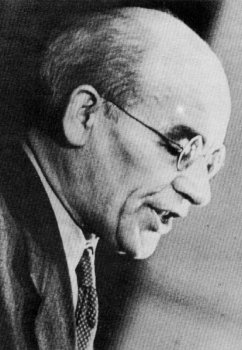
Władysław Gomułka, First Secretary of the Central Committee of the Polish Workers' Party, opponent of collectivization in Poland

The collectivization of agriculture in Poland was initiated by a decision of the 7th Plenum of the Central Committee of the Polish Workers' Party. The meeting took place from 31 August to 3 September 1948. After the removal of Władysław Gomułka, the position of party secretary general was taken over by Bolesław Bierut, a former Comintern official and NKVD functionary. The decision regarding collectivization was based on a resolution of the Cominform, adopted in June 1948 in Bucharest, which initiated the process in all countries of the communist bloc, with the collectivization of the countryside started on the explicit orders of Joseph Stalin. The actions of the communist authorities were legitimized by the United People's Party on 10 February 1950, and by the Polish Episcopate, after consultation with the government, on 14 April 1950.

=== Anti-kulak propaganda ===
Propaganda played an important role in the policy of rural collectivization. With the help of the mass media – the press, radio, posters, leaflets, and local public address systems – a formal attack was launched against farmers, who were called kulaks. In 1949, party activists decided that a kulak was a peasant who owned a 15-hectare farm.

In Poland, 10% of all farmers belonged to this category. During the 7th Plenum of the Central Committee of the Polish Workers' Party in 1948, Hilary Minc divided the Polish countryside into classes, categorizing peasants as poor, middle class, and kulaks. Those who had a tiled roof on their farm or were good at managing it were also included in the kulak group. Political propaganda assumed that kulaks should be dispossessed (for hiding and destroying crops), deprived of all their property, and their farms incorporated into the program of rural collectivization or State Agricultural Farms.

=== Cooperativisation process in the Gryfice countryside ===
By 1950, the effects of cooperativization in rural areas were insignificant. In 1949, only 243 production cooperatives were established in the country. Comprehensive measures were taken to support the collectivisation drive. Four anti-kulak laws were enacted, imposing mandatory deliveries of grain, potatoes, milk, and livestock. The collectivization process took place in two stages:

- Stage I: 1949–1951, known as direct coercion. It was characterized by the arrest of peasants who opposed collectivization. The intensity of pressure and repression varied depending on the resistance of the peasants in Gryfice. "Grain trios", with the cooperation of the Security Office and the Citizens' Militia, carried out illegal searches, and stole and vandalized farmers' property. Physical force was also used; the so-called kulaks were harassed, and in many cases arrest warrants were issued.
- Stage II: 1951–1954, known as indirect coercion, in which fiscal policy and a system of compulsory deliveries were used. Additional tax burdens brought farmers to economic ruin and forced them into collectivization.

In 1950, 7 cooperatives were operating in Gryfice County, covering a total area of 2,356 ha – just 3.34% of agricultural land. The total area of the county at that time was 101,800 ha. Of this, 70,400 ha was under cultivation (arable land 50,000 ha, orchards 300 ha, meadows 13,900 ha, pastures 6,200 ha). By 1955, 65 cooperatives had been established, grouping 1,628 farms and covering 18,094 ha of agricultural land. Cooperatives at that time farmed 25.7% of the agricultural area. The agrarian system in Western Pomerania was regulated by a circular of the Ministry of Recovered Territories of 15 July 1945, which established area norms for settlers. The proper agrarian system and settlement in Western Pomerania were governed by a decree of 6 September 1946, under which 90% of the land was to be occupied by individual farms and 10% by state farms. Those who joined cooperatives were predominantly economically disadvantaged peasants who had received land through subdivision during the land reform of 1944–1948, including through parcellation and settlement in the Recovered Territories in the period 1944–1945. Four types of cooperative were established:

- Land Cultivation Associations, characterised by common ownership of land while retaining private ownership of individual farm components – machinery, tools, and so on;
- Agricultural Cooperative Teams, characterised by common ownership of land without farm livestock;
- Agricultural Production Cooperatives, characterised by common ownership of land together with both dead and live stock; part of the stock, along with farm buildings and tools, remained at the disposal of cooperative members;
- Agricultural Cooperative Associations, with characteristics similar to those of Agricultural Cooperative Teams.

From 28,277 ha occupied by farms in 1950, individual agricultural holdings fell to 8,288 ha by 1955. The rural cooperativisation campaign conducted in this manner caused a decline in agricultural production. In the 1950s, the process of fragmentation of individual farms became apparent as a result of collectivisation. Records of the Presidium of the Gryfice County People's Council show that farms shrank by an average of 2.2 ha. The stated basis for this was mass applications from peasants to reduce the size of their farms in accordance with political directives. A process of surrendering farms to the state treasury was also recorded.

At the 8th Plenum of the CC PZPR in October 1956, the methods of rural cooperativisation were condemned. W. Gomułka stated that cooperatives that had been established under coercion could be dissolved. In 1957, all cooperatives in Gryfice County were dissolved and replaced by agricultural circles. In 1957 there were 7 of these, with 155 members. A new phase of cooperativisation of Gryfice agriculture began in August 1963, when a Production Cooperative was established in Smolęcin, followed by further ones in subsequent years.

== Gryfice affair ==
=== Official regulations ===
The collectivization process in the Gryfice County began in 1949, when the state administration started to implement a "regulation" program consisting in taking away land previously legally granted to some farmers in exchange for agricultural fallow land (in accordance with the directives of the county political authorities). The first secretary of the County Committee of the Polish United Workers' Party in Gryfice actively participated in the collectivization campaign. From November 1950, his activities were supported by a representative of the Central Committee and inspired by activists of the Voivodeship Committee in Szczecin. The activists of the County Board of the Union of Polish Youth in Gryfice were also involved in the collectivization of the countryside.

In 1950, abuses occurred during the purchase of grain, when over 7 tons of grain were unlawfully taken from farmers. Court penalties were imposed on resistant peasants, sometimes resulting in arrests. For example, a farmer from Trzebusz was arrested and sentenced to 5.5 years in prison in February 1951 for trading in foreign currency. The reason for the accusation was said to be the $2 found in his apartment. Unofficially, it was about the farmer's resistance to collectivization, while accounts from the family and witnesses indicated that the farmer had fulfilled his mandatory deliveries to the state.

=== Youth brigades ===
The County Board of the Union of Polish Youth in Gryfice – from which "grain trios" and "youth brigades" (assisted by employees of the State Machine Center) later emerged – began searching for grain. Several villages were selected for this purpose and dozens of searches were carried out in residential and farm buildings. During the campaign, farmers were imprisoned in separate buildings. Sometimes physical violence was used against them, and they were also intimidated. There were cases of property damage, especially to agricultural machinery and equipment, hooliganism, and theft.

=== Complaint by the affected farmers ===
In April 1951, the Central Committee of the Polish United Workers' Party received a complaint from three affected farmers and a letter of complaint from a Gryfice militiaman, Sergeant B. Cieślak, who condemned the actions of the "mobile brigade" and interceded on behalf of his brother Ignacy, a farmer from Chomętowo. The letters were among 38 files of peasant complaints from Poland found by Prof. D. Jarosz in the Agricultural Department of the Central Committee. Among the complainants was likely a former soldier of the First Polish Army. This information was forwarded to the Voivodeship Committee in Szczecin and the County Committee in Gryfice. In order to investigate the abuses, a commission was appointed to assess the material losses on site. Its members included the first secretary of the Polish United Workers' Party in Gryfice, a representative of the Central Committee, and the county prosecutor. After assessing the extent of the damage and interviewing the victims, the members of the "light cavalry brigade" were ordered to be arrested. They were released the next day after the intervention of their families.

On 3–4 May, another inspection was carried out. The commission of the Central Committee, chaired by A. Alster, recommended the arrest of the main perpetrators of the abuses after reviewing the evidence. The representative of the Central Committee, the deputy head of the Economic Department of the County Committee in Szczecin, the first secretary of the County Committee in Gryfice, the then head of the County Office of Public Security, and activists of the Union of Polish Youth were also detained. There were also cases of intimidation of peasants and physical violence, though on a smaller scale than before.

=== Show trial ===
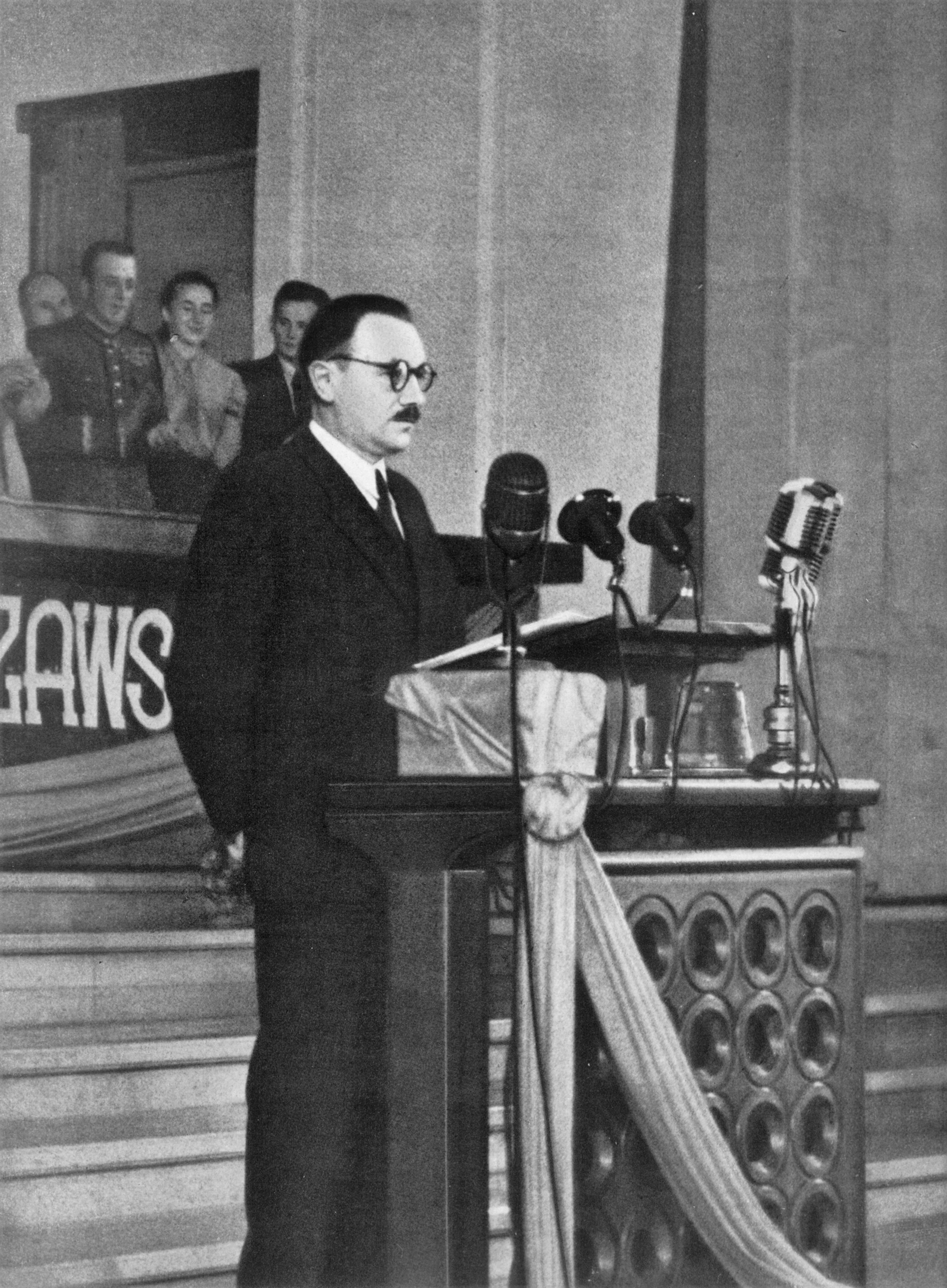
Bolesław Bierut, President of Poland, First Secretary of the Central Committee, and advocate of collectivization

On 25 May 1951, a show trial was held by the Supreme Court with the participation of the media, in which the grievances of seven affected farmers were recognized. They were ordered to be compensated for their losses. According to H. Minc's concept, these farmers were of middle class, with agricultural areas ranging from 7 to 11 hectares and farms kept in good condition, while according to the Presidium of the Voivodeship National Council, one farmer was a schemer and speculator, and the others were negatively disposed towards collectivization.

The Public Prosecutor General also acquitted all the arrested farmers, overturning the earlier verdicts. Another 11 were paid compensation from a special fund of the Presidium of the Voivodeship National Council in Szczecin. The lack of source data makes it impossible to determine whether the Gryfice trial took into account compensation for the remaining 11 farmers. According to unofficial information, they filed claims for compensation after the events were publicized by the press. The presidium paid it from government subsidies to compensate for the losses incurred by farmers in Gryfice.

=== Aftermath ===
The resolution of the Central Committee of the Polish United Workers' Party of 16 May 1951 officially condemned the events in Gryfice. On 24 May 1951, the Political Bureau of the Central Committee expelled all the accused from the party, though they were readmitted after 1956. In accordance with the guidelines, the County Committee in Gryfice was also dissolved. The party activists of the time were stripped of their functions and received penalties, including the removal from office and expulsion from the party of the First Secretary of the Voivodeship Committee in Koszalin, Jan Kozłowski. During a meeting of the executive Voivodeship Committee in Szczecin on 27 May 1951, the activities of "youth brigades" (the so-called "light cavalry brigades") in Gryfice County were also condemned. According to Prof. D. Jarosz, the Central Committee asked provincial committees to assess the progress of collectivization. All of them issued appropriate resolutions on the abuses of power. A report on the activities of the youth brigades in Gryfice was delivered by J. Pryma, then First Secretary of the Voivodeship Committee in Szczecin. The next stage of collectivization was also suspended for several months. According to Prof. D. Jarosz, this period lasted approximately 6 months.

The publication of the events in Gryfice in the national media sparked agricultural protests against abuses in other regions of Poland and widespread resignations from cooperatives. A subsequent resolution of the Central Committee from September 1951 on the events in Drawsko was not announced. However, in a circular letter of 29 September 1951, the Public Prosecutor General recommended initiating criminal proceedings against the "ringleaders" who were inciting people to leave the cooperatives.

== Bibliography ==
- Kaczorowski, Andrzej W. (2009). "Rozprute sztandary. Z Franciszkiem Gryciukiem, Antonim Kurą i Mateuszem Szpytmą rozmawia Andrzej W. Kaczorowski" [Torn Banners: Andrzej W. Kaczorowski in Conversation with Franciszek Gryciuk, Antoni Kura, and Mateusz Szpytma]. Biuletyn Instytutu Pamięci Narodowej (in Polish). 10–11 (105–106).
- Marzec, C. (1987). "Bezpośrednie przyczyny i przebieg wydarzeń gryfickich w 1951 roku" [The Immediate Causes and Course of the Gryfice Events of 1951]. In Kozłowski, K. (ed.). Ziemia Gryficka 1945–1985 [Gryfice Land 1945–1985] (in Polish). Gryfice: Gryfice Cultural Society.
- Miklos, S. (1973). "Rolnictwo powiatu gryfickiego w latach 1945–1970" [Agriculture in Gryfice County, 1945–1970]. In Białecki, Tadeusz (ed.). Ziemia Gryficka 1970-1971 [Gryfice Land 1970-1971] (in Polish). Szczecin: West Pomeranian Institute.
- Polak, Barbara (January 2002). "Cena wygranej. O problemach wsi w PRL z Tomaszem Berezą, Leszkiem Próchniakiem, Ryszardem Śmietanka-Kruszelnickim, rozmawia Barbara Polak" [The Price of Victory: On the Problems of the Countryside in Polish People's Republic with Tomasz Bereza, Leszek Próchniak, Ryszard Śmietanka-Kruszelnicki, Interviewed by Barbara Polak]. Biuletyn Instytutu Pamięci Narodowej (in Polish). 1 (12).
- Pronobis, Witold (1996). Polska i świat w XX wieku [Poland and the World in the 20th Century] (in Polish). Warsaw: Editions Spotkania. ISBN 83-86802-11-1.
