= Witno =

- Village
- Location within Poland
- Coordinates: 53°56′40″N 15°3′45″E
- Country: Poland
- Voivodeship: West Pomeranian
- County: Gryfice
- Gmina: Gryfice

Witno [ˈvitnɔ] (German: Wittenfelde) is a village in the administrative district of Gmina Gryfice, within Gryfice County, West Pomeranian Voivodeship, in north-western Poland. It lies approximately 10 km (6 mi) west of Gryfice and 67 km (42 mi) north-east of the regional capital Szczecin.

For the history of the region, see History of Pomerania.
