= Kołomąć =

- Village
- Location within Poland
- Coordinates: 53°52′7″N 15°7′1″E
- Country: Poland
- Voivodeship: West Pomeranian
- County: Gryfice
- Gmina: Gryfice

Kołomąć [kɔˈwɔmɔnt͡ɕ] (German: Koldemanz) is a village in the administrative district of Gmina Gryfice, within Gryfice County, West Pomeranian Voivodeship, in north-western Poland. It lies approximately 8 km (5 mi) south-west of Gryfice and 62 km (39 mi) north-east of the regional capital Szczecin.

In Kołomąć, there are ruins of the church, the chapel, and a German cemetery.

== See also ==
- History of Pomerania
