= Trzebusz =

- Village
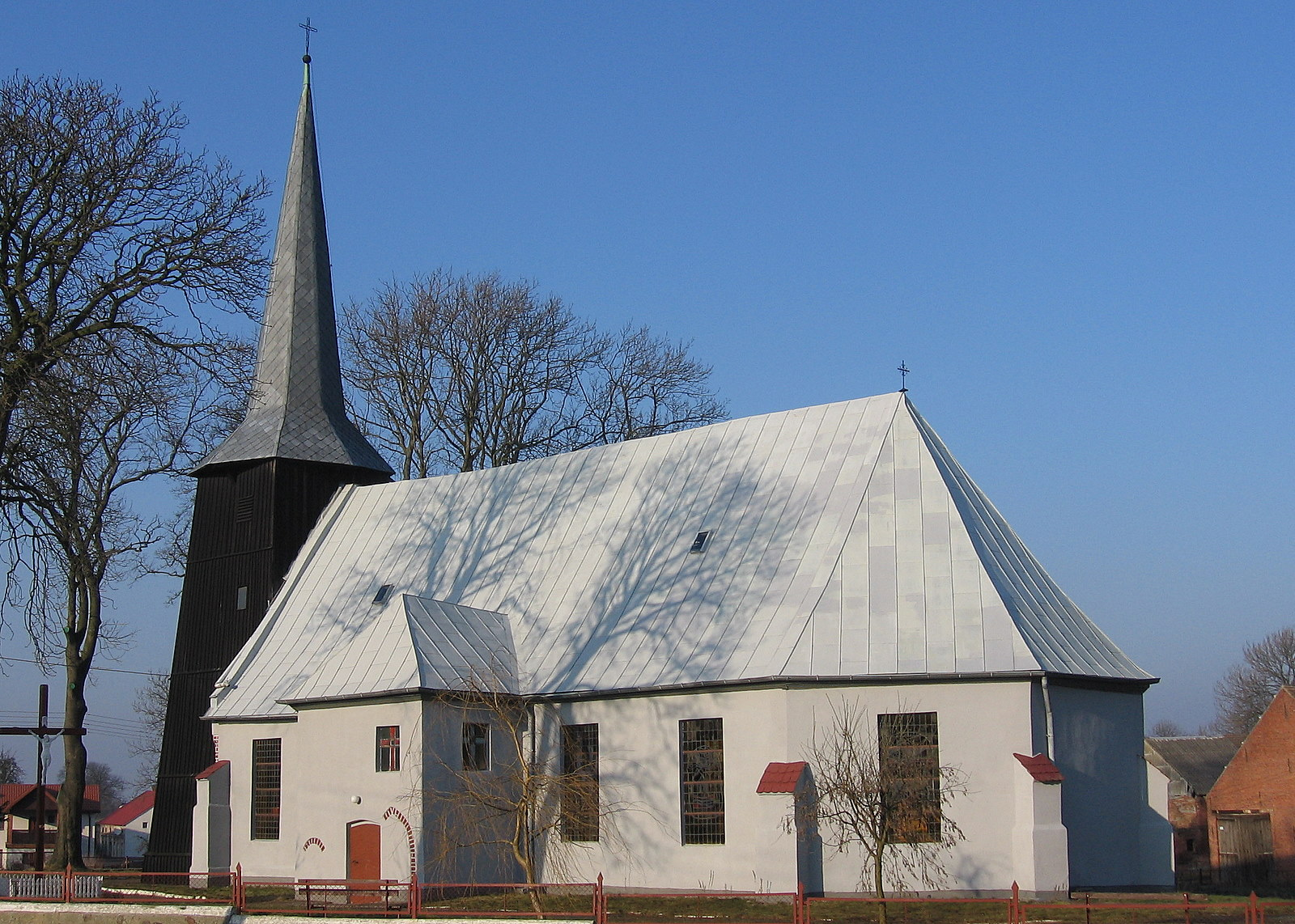
- Church of Saint Joseph

- Location within Poland
- Coordinates: 54°5′29″N 15°15′52″E
- Country: Poland
- Voivodeship: West Pomeranian
- County: Gryfice
- Gmina: Trzebiatów

Population
  - Total: 693

Trzebusz [ˈtʂɛbuʂ] (German: Triebs) is a village in the administrative district of Gmina Trzebiatów, within Gryfice County, West Pomeranian Voivodeship, in north-western Poland. It lies approximately 4 km (2 mi) north of Trzebiatów, 21 km (13 mi) north of Gryfice, and 88 km (55 mi) north-east of the regional capital Szczecin.

The village has a population of 693.

== See also ==
- History of Pomerania
