= Voivodeship road 105 =

Road in Poland

Voivodeship Road 105
- Droga wojewódzka nr 105

Route information
- Maintained by Zachodnio Pomorski Zarząd Dróg Wojewódzkich
- Length: 40 km (25 mi)

Major junctions
- From: Świerzno
- To: Rzesznikowo

Location
- Country: Poland
- Regions: West Pomeranian Voivodeship

Highway system
- National roads in Poland; Voivodeship roads
| ← DW 104 | → DW 106 |

Voivodeship road 105 (Polish: Droga wojewódzka nr 105, abbreviated DW 105) is a route in the Polish voivodeship roads network. The road is located in the north of the West Pomeranian Voivodeship, its 40 km length links Świerzno with the National Road 6 near Rzesznikowo. The road runs through three powiats: Kamień County (Gmina Świerzno), Gryfice County (Gmina Gryfice and Gmina Brojce) and Kołobrzeg County (Gmina Rymań).

== Important settlements along the route ==
- Świerzno
- Gryfice
- Brojce
- Rzesznikowo

== Route plan ==
| km | Icon | Name | Crossed roads |
|---|---|---|---|
| x | | Kamień Pomorski | — |
| x | | Trzebiatów | — |
| 0 | | Świerzno | |
| 9 | | Level crossing for the Gryfice Wąsk - Pogorzelica Gryfice | — |
| 14 | | Level crossing for the Gryfice Wąsk - Pogorzelica Gryfice | — |
| 17 | | Level crossing for the Railway Line 402 | |
| 18 | | Gryfice | |
| x | | Bridge over the river Rega | — |
| 20 | | Level crossing for the Trzebiatów Wąsk - Gryfice Wąsk | — |
| 30 | | Brojce | — |
| 31 | | Level crossing for the Trzebiatów Wąsk - Gryfice Wąsk | — |
| 40 | | Rzesznikowo | |
| x | | Kołbaskowo | — |
| x | | Pruszcz Gdański | — |
