= Voivodeship road 103 =

Road in Poland

Voivodeship Road 103
- Droga wojewódzka nr 103

Route information
- Maintained by Zachodnio Pomorski Zarząd Dróg Wojewódzkich
- Length: 36 km (22 mi)

Major junctions
- From: Kamień Pomorski
- To: Trzebiatów

Location
- Country: Poland
- Regions: West Pomeranian Voivodeship
- Major cities: Kamień Pomorski

Highway system
- National roads in Poland; Voivodeship roads
← DW 102	→ DW 104

Voivodeship road 103 (Polish: Droga wojewódzka nr 103, abbreviated DW 103) is a route in the Polish voivodeship roads network. The route runs in the north of the West Pomeranian Voivodeship for 36 km which links Kamień Pomorski with Trzebiatów. The route runs through two powiats (Gmina Kamień Pomorski and Gmina Świerzno.

== Major cities and towns along the route ==
- Kamień Pomorski
- Mokrawica
- Świerzno
- Ciećmierz
- Paprotno
- Cerkwica
- Chomętowo
- Trzebiatów

== Route plan ==
km	Icon	Name	Crossed roads
x		Dziwnówek	—
x		Parłówko	—
0		Kamień Pomorski	
		Świerzno Roundabout	
21		Level crossing	—
24		Cerkwica	
36		Trzebiatów	
x		Misdroy	—
x		Kołobrzeg	—
x		Mrzeżyno	—
x		Płoty	—
