= Lusowo, West Pomeranian Voivodeship =

Lusowo
- Village
- Location within Poland
- Coordinates: 53°54′20″N 15°24′12″E
- Country: Poland
- Voivodeship: West Pomeranian
- County: Gryfice
- Gmina: Płoty

Lusowo [luˈsɔvɔ] (German: Lüssow) is a village in the administrative district of Gmina Płoty, within Gryfice County, West Pomeranian Voivodeship, in north-western Poland. It lies approximately 15 km (9 mi) north-east of Płoty, 14 km (9 mi) east of Gryfice, and 77 km (48 mi) north-east of the regional capital Szczecin.

For the history of the region, see History of Pomerania.
