= Pruszcz, Gryfice County =

Pruszcz
- Village
- Location within Poland
- Coordinates: 53°58′0″N 15°18′0″E
- Country: Poland
- Voivodeship: West Pomeranian
- County: Gryfice
- Gmina: Brojce
- Population: 145

Pruszcz [pruʂt͡ʂ] (German: Prust) is a village in the administrative district of Gmina Brojce, within Gryfice County, West Pomeranian Voivodeship, in north-western Poland. It lies approximately 5 km (3 mi) west of Brojce, 9 km (6 mi) north-east of Gryfice, and 78 km (48 mi) north-east of the regional capital Szczecin.

Before 1637 the area was part of Duchy of Pomerania. For the history of the region, see History of Pomerania.

The village has a population of 145.
