= Wicimice =

- Village
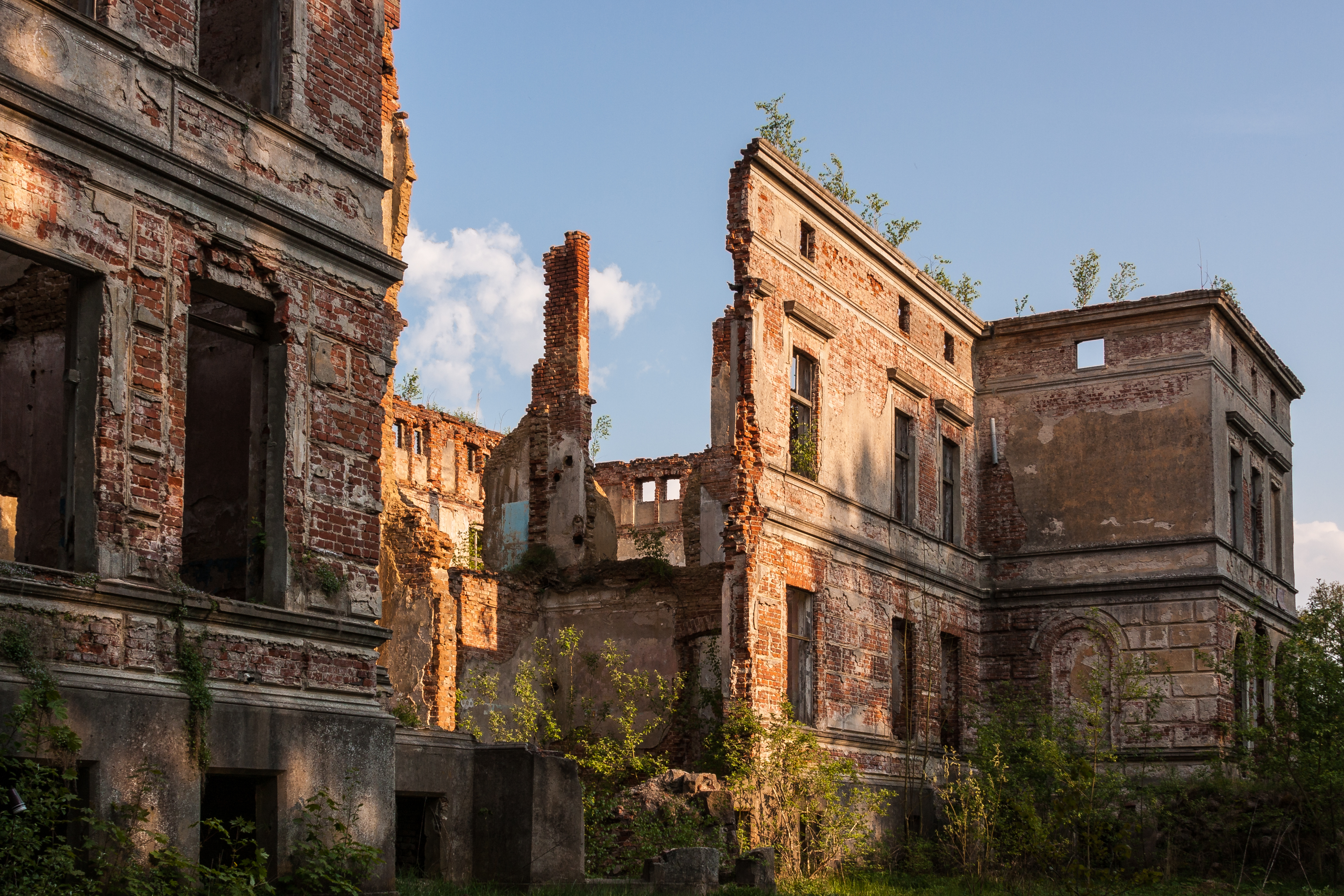
- Ruins of the Wicimice Palace (2009)

- Location within Poland
- Coordinates: 53°52′N 15°23′E
- Country: Poland
- Voivodeship: West Pomeranian
- County: Gryfice
- Gmina: Płoty
- Time zone: UTC+1 (CET)
  - Summer (DST): UTC+2 (CEST)
- Vehicle registration: ZGY

Wicimice [vit͡ɕiˈmit͡sɛ] is a village in the administrative district of Gmina Płoty, within Gryfice County, West Pomeranian Voivodeship, in north-western Poland. It lies approximately 11 km (7 mi) north-east of Płoty, 14 km (9 mi) south-east of Gryfice, and 73 km (45 mi) north-east of the regional capital Szczecin.

== Notable residents ==
- Erich Hoffmann (1868–1959), dermatologist
- Hans-Georg von der Osten (1895-1987), Luftwaffe officer
- Christoph Friedrich von der Osten (1714–1777), German nobleman (Landrat des Osten- und Blücherschen Kreises)
- August von der Osten (1855–1895), German nobleman and politician (Landrat des Kreises Regenwalde)
