= Mojszewo =

- Village
- Location within Poland
- Coordinates: 54°0′31″N 15°5′38″E
- Country: Poland
- Voivodeship: West Pomeranian
- County: Gryfice
- Gmina: Karnice

Mojszewo [mɔi̯ˈʂɛvɔ] (German: Groß Moitzow) is a village in the administrative district of Gmina Karnice, within Gryfice County, West Pomeranian Voivodeship, in north-western Poland. It lies approximately 4 km (2 mi) south-east of Karnice, 13 km (8 mi) north-west of Gryfice, and 74 km (46 mi) north-east of the regional capital Szczecin.

== See also ==
- History of Pomerania
