= Żukowo, Gryfice County =

Żukowo
- Village
- Location within Poland
- Coordinates: 53°59′58″N 15°18′50″E
- Country: Poland
- Voivodeship: West Pomeranian
- County: Gryfice
- Gmina: Brojce
- Population: 216

Żukowo [ʐuˈkɔvɔ] (German: Suckowshof) is a village in the administrative district of Gmina Brojce, within Gryfice County, West Pomeranian Voivodeship, in north-western Poland. It lies approximately 6 km (4 mi) north-west of Brojce, 13 km (8 mi) north-east of Gryfice, and 81 km (50 mi) north-east of the regional capital Szczecin.

The village has a population of 216.
