= Trzeszyn =

- Village
- Location within Poland
- Coordinates: 53°59′56″N 15°9′2″E
- Country: Poland
- Voivodeship: West Pomeranian
- County: Gryfice
- Gmina: Karnice

Trzeszyn [ˈtʂɛʂɨn] (German: Tressin) is a village in the administrative district of Gmina Karnice, within Gryfice County, West Pomeranian Voivodeship, in north-western Poland. It lies approximately 8 km (5 mi) south-east of Karnice, 10 km (6 mi) north of Gryfice, and 75 km (47 mi) north-east of the regional capital Szczecin.
