= Truskolas =

- Village
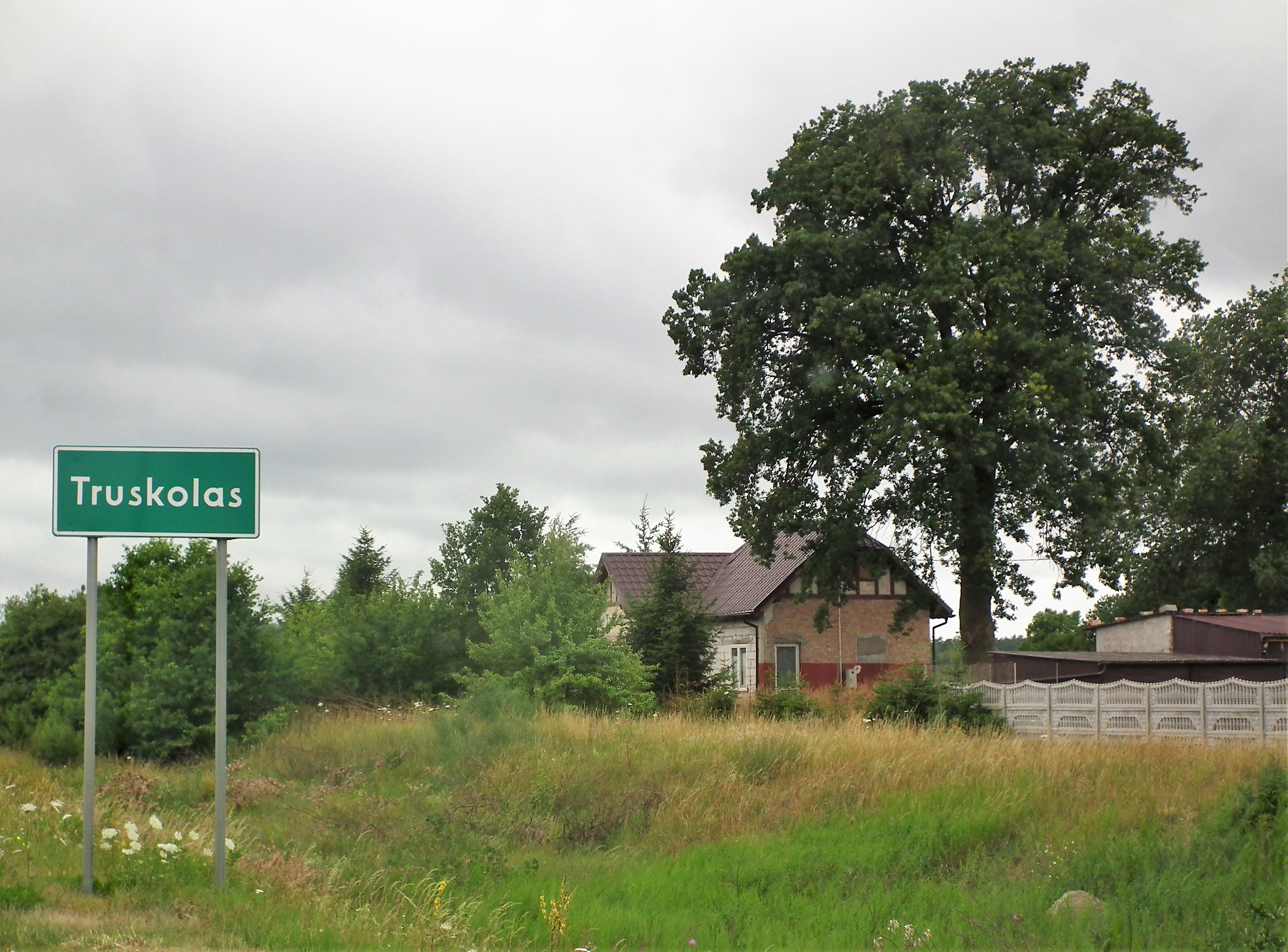

- Location within Poland
- Coordinates: 53°48′56″N 15°7′40″E
- Country: Poland
- Voivodeship: West Pomeranian
- County: Gryfice
- Gmina: Płoty

Truskolas [trusˈkɔlas] (formerly German: Trutzlatz) is a village in the administrative district of Gmina Płoty, within Gryfice County, West Pomeranian Voivodeship, in north-western Poland. It lies approximately 10 km (6 mi) west of Płoty, 12 km (7 mi) south-west of Gryfice, and 58 km (36 mi) north-east of the regional capital Szczecin.

For the history of the region, see History of Pomerania.
