= Karczewie =

- Village
- Location within Poland
- Coordinates: 53°49′N 15°15′E
- Country: Poland
- Voivodeship: West Pomeranian
- County: Gryfice
- Gmina: Płoty

Karczewie [karˈt͡ʂɛvjɛ] (German: Marienau) is a village in the administrative district of Gmina Płoty, within Gryfice County, West Pomeranian Voivodeship, in north-western Poland. It lies approximately 2 km (1 mi) north-west of Płoty, 12 km (7 mi) south of Gryfice, and 63 km (39 mi) north-east of the regional capital Szczecin.
