= Węgorzyn, West Pomeranian Voivodeship =

Węgorzyn
- Village
- Location within Poland
- Coordinates: 54°0′21″N 15°10′39″E
- Country: Poland
- Voivodeship: West Pomeranian
- County: Gryfice
- Gmina: Karnice

Węgorzyn [vɛnˈɡɔʐɨn] (German: Wangerin) is a village in the administrative district of Gmina Karnice, within Gryfice County, West Pomeranian Voivodeship, in north-western Poland. It lies approximately 9 km (6 mi) east of Karnice, 11 km (7 mi) north of Gryfice, and 77 km (48 mi) north-east of the regional capital Szczecin.
