= Drozdówko, Gryfice County =

Drozdówko
- Settlement
- Location within Poland
- Coordinates: 54°4′8″N 15°7′9″E
- Country: Poland
- Voivodeship: West Pomeranian
- County: Gryfice
- Gmina: Karnice

Drozdówko [drɔzˈdufkɔ] (German: Krähenkrug) is a settlement in the administrative district of Gmina Karnice, within Gryfice County, West Pomeranian Voivodeship, in north-western Poland. It lies approximately 6 km (4 mi) north-east of Karnice, 18 km (11 mi) north of Gryfice, and 81 km (50 mi) north-east of the regional capital Szczecin.

For the history of the region, see History of Pomerania.
