= Janowo, Gryfice County =

Janowo
- Village
- Location within Poland
- Coordinates: 54°2′8″N 14°59′11″E
- Country: Poland
- Voivodeship: West Pomeranian
- County: Gryfice
- Gmina: Karnice

Janowo [jaˈnɔvɔ] (German: Johannisthal) is a village in the administrative district of Gmina Karnice, within Gryfice County, West Pomeranian Voivodeship, in north-western Poland. It lies approximately 5 km (3 mi) west of Karnice, 20 km (12 mi) north-west of Gryfice, and 74 km (46 mi) north of the regional capital Szczecin.

For the history of the region, see History of Pomerania.
