= Kiełpino, Gryfice County =

Kiełpino
- Village
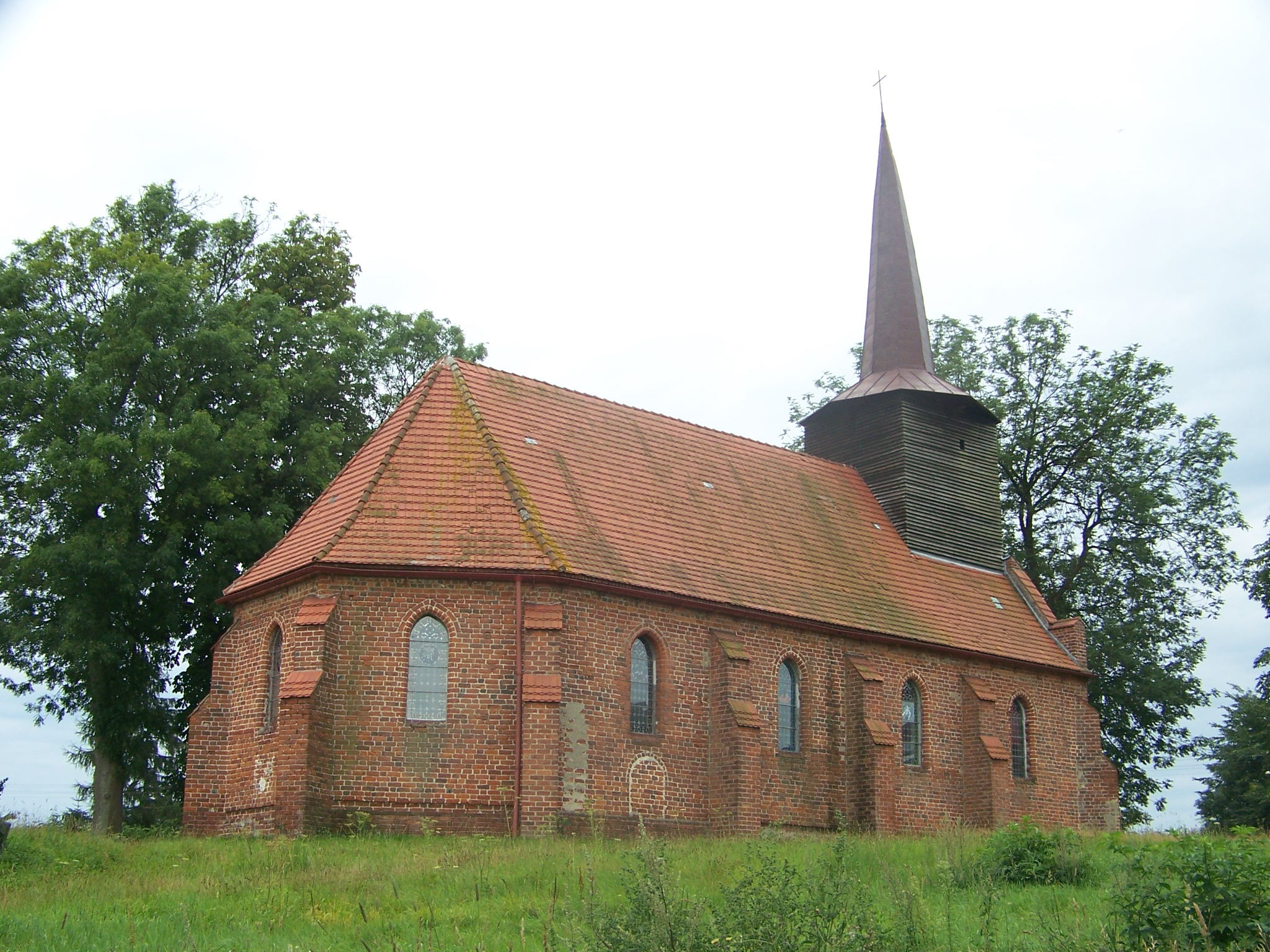
- Church

- Location within Poland
- Coordinates: 53°56′13″N 15°24′29″E
- Country: Poland
- Voivodeship: West Pomeranian
- County: Gryfice
- Gmina: Brojce
- Population: 261

Kiełpino [kʲɛu̯ˈpinɔ] (German: Kolpin) is a village in the administrative district of Gmina Brojce, within Gryfice County, West Pomeranian Voivodeship, in north-western Poland. It lies approximately 4 km (2 mi) south-east of Brojce, 14 km (9 mi) east of Gryfice, and 80 km (50 mi) north-east of the regional capital Szczecin.

The village has a population of 261.
