= Pogorzelica, Gmina Karnice =

Pogorzelica
- Village
- Location within Poland
- Coordinates: 54°5′31″N 15°7′49″E
- Country: Poland
- Voivodeship: West Pomeranian
- County: Gryfice
- Gmina: Karnice
- Time zone: UTC+1 (CET)
  - Summer (DST): UTC+2 (CEST)
- Vehicle registration: ZGY

Pogorzelica [pɔɡɔʐɛˈlit͡sa] (German: Fischerkaten) is a village in the administrative district of Gmina Karnice, within Gryfice County, West Pomeranian Voivodeship, in north-western Poland. It lies approximately 9 km (6 mi) north-east of Karnice, 21 km (13 mi) north of Gryfice, and 84 km (52 mi) north-east of the regional capital Szczecin. It is located in the historic region of Pomerania.

It borders with the village of Pogorzelica, Gmina Rewal in the north.

== History ==
The area became part of the emerging Polish state in the 10th century. Following Poland's fragmentation, it formed part of the Duchy of Pomerania. From the 18th century it was part of the Kingdom of Prussia, and from 1871 it was also part of Germany. Following Germany's defeat in World War II in 1945, the area became again part of Poland.
