= Dobiesław, Gryfice County =

Dobiesław
- Settlement
- Location within Poland
- Coordinates: 53°48′20″N 15°19′10″E
- Country: Poland
- Voivodeship: West Pomeranian
- County: Gryfice
- Gmina: Płoty

Dobiesław [dɔˈbjɛswaf] (German: Altenhagen) is a settlement in the administrative district of Gmina Płoty, within Gryfice County, West Pomeranian Voivodeship, in north-western Poland. It lies approximately 4 km (2 mi) east of Płoty, 15 km (9 mi) south-east of Gryfice, and 65 km (40 mi) north-east of the regional capital Szczecin.
