= Ninikowo =

- Village
- Location within Poland
- Coordinates: 54°3′30″N 15°1′30″E
- Country: Poland
- Voivodeship: West Pomeranian
- County: Gryfice
- Gmina: Karnice

Ninikowo [niniˈkɔvɔ] (German: Ninikow) is a village in the administrative district of Gmina Karnice, within Gryfice County, West Pomeranian Voivodeship, in north-western Poland. It lies approximately 4 km (2 mi) north-west of Karnice, 20 km (12 mi) north-west of Gryfice, and 77 km (48 mi) north of the regional capital Szczecin.

For the history of the region, see History of Pomerania.
