= Zapole, West Pomeranian Voivodeship =

Zapole
- Village
- Location within Poland
- Coordinates: 54°0′N 15°3′E
- Country: Poland
- Voivodeship: West Pomeranian
- County: Gryfice
- Gmina: Karnice

Zapole [zaˈpɔlɛ] (German: Eckernfelde) is a village in the administrative district of Gmina Karnice, within Gryfice County, West Pomeranian Voivodeship, in north-western Poland. It lies approximately 4 km (2 mi) south of Karnice, 14 km (9 mi) north-west of Gryfice, and 72 km (45 mi) north-east of the regional capital Szczecin.
