= Przybiernowo =

- Village
- Location within Poland
- Coordinates: 53°56′27″N 15°17′52″E
- Country: Poland
- Voivodeship: West Pomeranian
- County: Gryfice
- Gmina: Brojce
- Population: 326

Przybiernowo [pʂɨbjɛrˈnɔvɔ] (German: Wendisch Pribbernow) is a village in the administrative district of Gmina Brojce, within Gryfice County, West Pomeranian Voivodeship, in north-western Poland. It lies approximately 5 km (3 mi) west of Brojce, 8 km (5 mi) north-east of Gryfice, and 75 km (47 mi) north-east of the regional capital Szczecin.

The village has a population of 326.
