= Wyszobór =

- Village
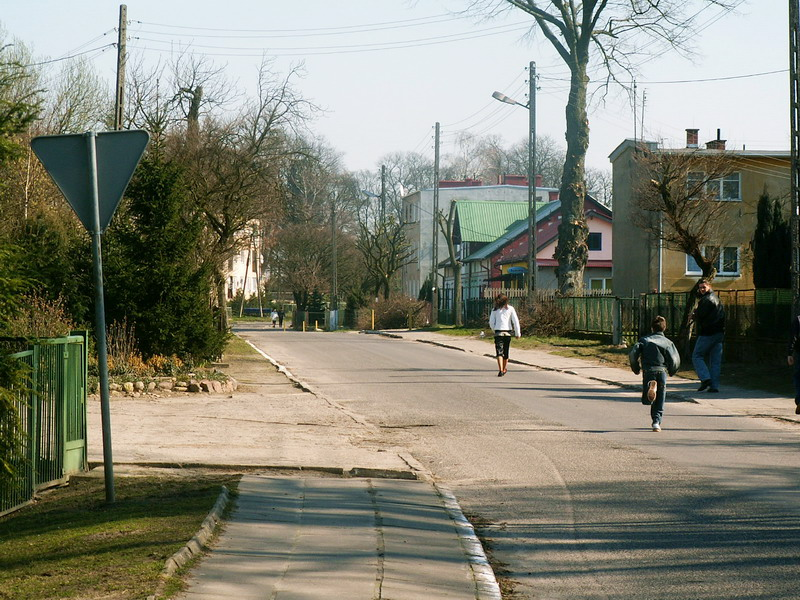

- Location within Poland
- Coordinates: 53°53′12″N 15°19′14″E
- Country: Poland
- Voivodeship: West Pomeranian
- County: Gryfice
- Gmina: Płoty
- Time zone: UTC+1 (CET)
  - Summer (DST): UTC+2 (CEST)
- Vehicle registration: ZGY

Wyszobór [vɨˈʂɔbur] is a village in the administrative district of Gmina Płoty, within Gryfice County, West Pomeranian Voivodeship, in north-western Poland. It lies approximately 10 km (6 mi) north-east of Płoty, 9 km (6 mi) east of Gryfice, and 72 km (45 mi) north-east of the regional capital Szczecin.

== History ==
The territory became part of the emerging Polish state under its first ruler Mieszko I around 967. Following the fragmentation of Poland, it was part of the Duchy of Pomerania.

During World War II, the Germans operated a forced labour subcamp of the prison in Goleniów in the village.

== Transport ==
The Polish S6 highway passes nearby, east of Wyszobór.
