= Kocierz =

- Village
- Location within Poland
- Coordinates: 53°50′52″N 15°16′54″E
- Country: Poland
- Voivodeship: West Pomeranian
- County: Gryfice
- Gmina: Płoty

Kocierz [ˈkɔt͡ɕɛʂ] (German: Kutzer) is a village in the administrative district of Gmina Płoty, within Gryfice County, West Pomeranian Voivodeship, in north-western Poland. It lies approximately 5 km (3 mi) north of Płoty, 10 km (6 mi) south-east of Gryfice, and 67 km (42 mi) north-east of the regional capital Szczecin.
