= Lisowo, Gryfice County =

Lisowo
- Village
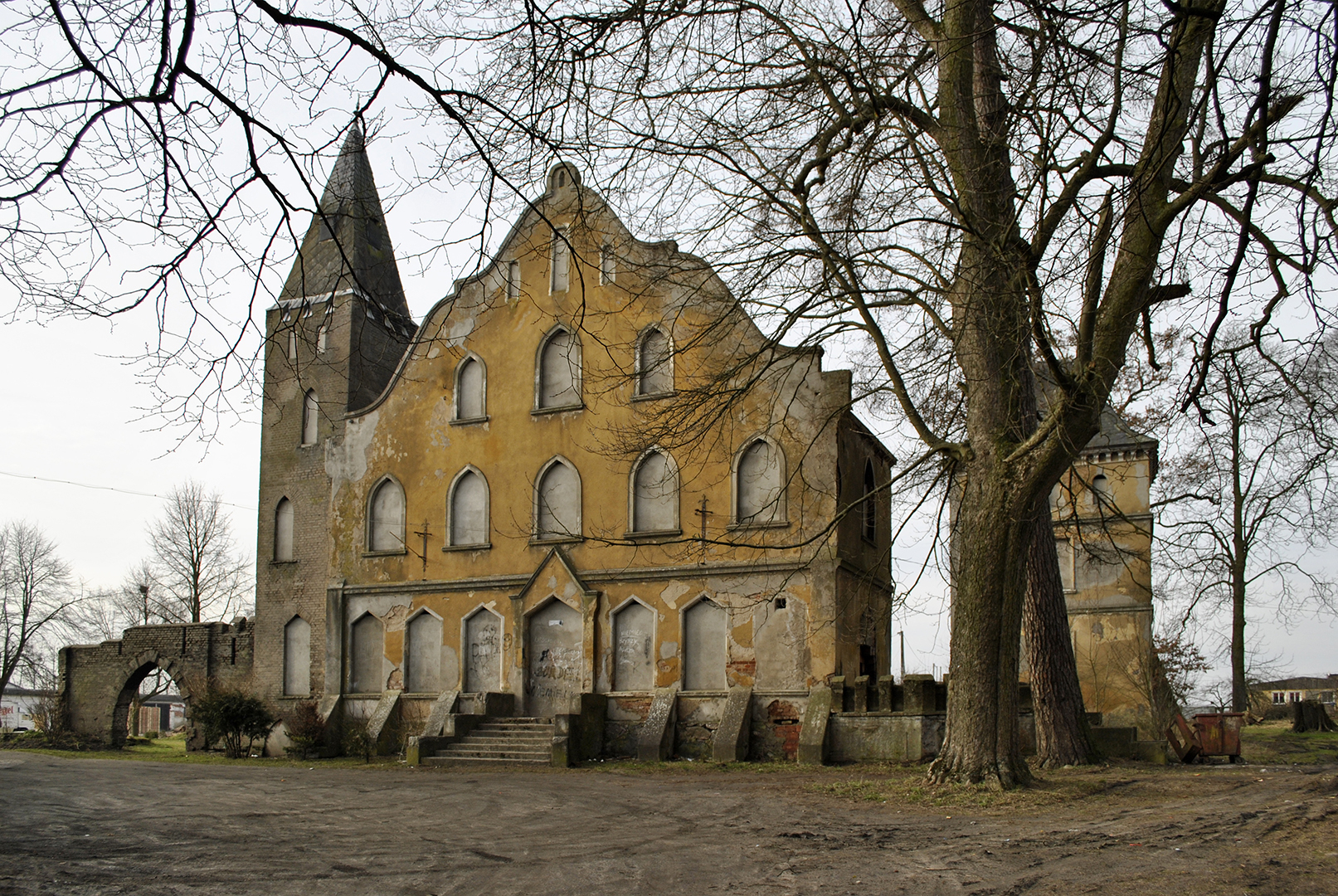
- Ruins of Lisowo Palace

- Location within Poland
- Coordinates: 53°46′27″N 15°15′0″E
- Country: Poland
- Voivodeship: West Pomeranian
- County: Gryfice
- Gmina: Płoty
- Time zone: UTC+1 (CET)
  - Summer (DST): UTC+2 (CEST)
- Vehicle registration: ZGY

Lisowo [liˈsɔvɔ] is a village in the Administrative District of Gmina Płoty, within Gryfice County, West Pomeranian Voivodeship, in northwestern Poland. It lies approximately 4 km (2 mi) south of Płoty, 16 km (10 mi) south of Gryfice, and 60 km (37 mi) north-east of the regional capital Szczecin.

It is located in the historic region of Pomerania.

== People ==
- Georg von Eisenhart-Rothe (1849-1942), Prussian politician
- Paul von Eisenhart-Rothe (1857-1923), Prussian politician and agriculture minister
- Hans von Eisenhart-Rothe (1862-1942), German jurist
