= Drozdowo, Gryfice County =

Drozdowo
- Village
- Location within Poland
- Coordinates: 54°3′43″N 15°7′30″E
- Country: Poland
- Voivodeship: West Pomeranian
- County: Gryfice
- Gmina: Karnice

Drozdowo [drɔzˈdɔvɔ] (German: Hohen Drosedow) is a village in the administrative district of Gmina Karnice, within Gryfice County, West Pomeranian Voivodeship, in north-western Poland. It lies approximately 6 km (4 mi) north-east of Karnice, 18 km (11 mi) north of Gryfice, and 80 km (50 mi) north-east of the regional capital Szczecin.

For the history of the region, see History of Pomerania.
