= Strzykocin =

- Village
- Location within Poland
- Coordinates: 53°58′34″N 15°23′40″E
- Country: Poland
- Voivodeship: West Pomeranian
- County: Gryfice
- Gmina: Brojce
- Population: 175

Strzykocin [stʂɨˈkɔt͡ɕin] (German: Streckenthin) is a village in the administrative district of Gmina Brojce, within Gryfice County, West Pomeranian Voivodeship, in north-western Poland. It lies approximately 3 km (2 mi) north-east of Brojce, 15 km (9 mi) north-east of Gryfice, and 82 km (51 mi) north-east of the regional capital Szczecin.

The village has a population of 175.

== Barrow cemetery ==
In the vicinity of the village lies an early medieval barrow cemetery, identified and partly investigated already in the 19th century. The site consists of about ten barrows with a characteristic quadrilateral shape, classified as the so-called Orzeszkowo type. Such square or rectangular barrows represent a distinctive funerary form of early medieval Pomerania, usually associated with the 11th–12th centuries.

Although the cemetery at Strzykocin constitutes an important example of this phenomenon, it remains relatively neglected today. The issue of quadrilateral barrows has recently been revisited in connection with investigations at the cemetery in Nowy Chorów, Słupsk County.
