= Voivodeship road 104 =

Former road in Poland

Voivodeship Road 104
- Droga wojewódzka nr 104

Route information
- Maintained by Dolnośląski Zarząd Dróg Wojewódzkich
- Length: 4 km (2.5 mi)

Major junctions
- From: DW 330 in Leszkowice

- To: DW 292 in Trzęsów

Location
- Country: Poland
- Regions: Lower Silesian Voivodeship

Highway system
- National roads in Poland; Voivodeship roads
| ← DW 103 | → DW 105 |

Voivodeship Road 104 (Polish: Droga wojewódzka nr 104, abbreviated DW 104) is a former voivodeship road. The route linked the voivodeship road 292 in Trzęsów with voivodeship road 330 in Leszkowice. The road ran through two powiats: Polkowice County and Głogów County. The road has a length of 4 km.

DW 104 lost provincial road status on 12 September 2019.

== Important settlements along the route ==
- Leszkowice
- Trzęsów

== Route plan ==
| km | Icon | Name | Crossed roads |
|---|---|---|---|
| x | | Bytnik | — |
| x | | Luboszyce | — |
| 0 | | Leszkowice | |
| 3 | | Trzęsów | — |
| 4 | | — | |
| x | | Nowa Sól | — |
| x | | Lubin | — |
