= Raciborów, West Pomeranian Voivodeship =

Raciborów
- Village
- Location within Poland
- Coordinates: 53°55′59″N 15°25′35″E
- Country: Poland
- Voivodeship: West Pomeranian
- County: Gryfice
- Gmina: Brojce
- Population: 24

Raciborów [rat͡ɕiˈbɔruf] (German: Vogelsang) is a village in the administrative district of Gmina Brojce, within Gryfice County, West Pomeranian Voivodeship, in north-western Poland. It lies approximately 5 km (3 mi) south-east of Brojce, 16 km (10 mi) east of Gryfice, and 80 km (50 mi) north-east of the regional capital Szczecin.

The village has a population of 24.
