= Niedysz =

- Village
- Location within Poland
- Coordinates: 54°0′58″N 15°2′20″E
- Country: Poland
- Voivodeship: West Pomeranian
- County: Gryfice
- Gmina: Karnice

Niedysz [ˈɲɛdɨʂ] (German: Neides) is a village in the administrative district of Gmina Karnice, within Gryfice County, West Pomeranian Voivodeship, in north-western Poland. It lies approximately 3 km (2 mi) south-west of Karnice, 16 km (10 mi) north-west of Gryfice, and 73 km (45 mi) north-east of the regional capital Szczecin.

For the history of the region, see History of Pomerania.
