= Tąpadły =

- Village
- Location within Poland
- Coordinates: 53°55′44″N 15°19′43″E
- Country: Poland
- Voivodeship: West Pomeranian
- County: Gryfice
- Gmina: Brojce
- Population: 164

Tąpadły [tɔmˈpadwɨ] (German: Dummadel) is a village in the administrative district of Gmina Brojce, within Gryfice County, West Pomeranian Voivodeship, in north-western Poland. It lies approximately 4 km (2 mi) south-west of Brojce, 9 km (6 mi) east of Gryfice, and 76 km (47 mi) north-east of the regional capital Szczecin.

The village has a population of 164.
