= Darżewo, Gryfice County =

Darżewo
- Village
- Location within Poland
- Coordinates: 54°0′45″N 15°21′7″E
- Country: Poland
- Voivodeship: West Pomeranian
- County: Gryfice
- Gmina: Brojce
- Population: 145

Darżewo [darˈʐɛvɔ] (German: Darsow) is a village in the administrative district of Gmina Brojce, within Gryfice County, West Pomeranian Voivodeship, in north-western Poland. It lies approximately 7 km (4 mi) north of Brojce, 15 km (9 mi) north-east of Gryfice, and 84 km (52 mi) north-east of the regional capital Szczecin.

As of 2013, the village had a population of 145.

The village was first mentioned as Darsowe around 1180, when Casimir I gave the village to the Danish Norbertines from Lund who came to Białoboki. In 1208, Dukes Bogislaw II and Casimir II, and in 1224, Pomeranian Duchess Anastasia, confirmed the granting of the village to the Norbertine monastery in Białoboki. The monastery in Bialoboki ruled Darżewo directly until 1487, when the village was given as a fief to Heinrich Borcke.

In 1910, the village had a population of 265. Darżewo, which belonged to the Gryfice district, was part of the Evangelical parish in Dargoslaw and the district of Molstowo.
