= Niczonów =

- Village
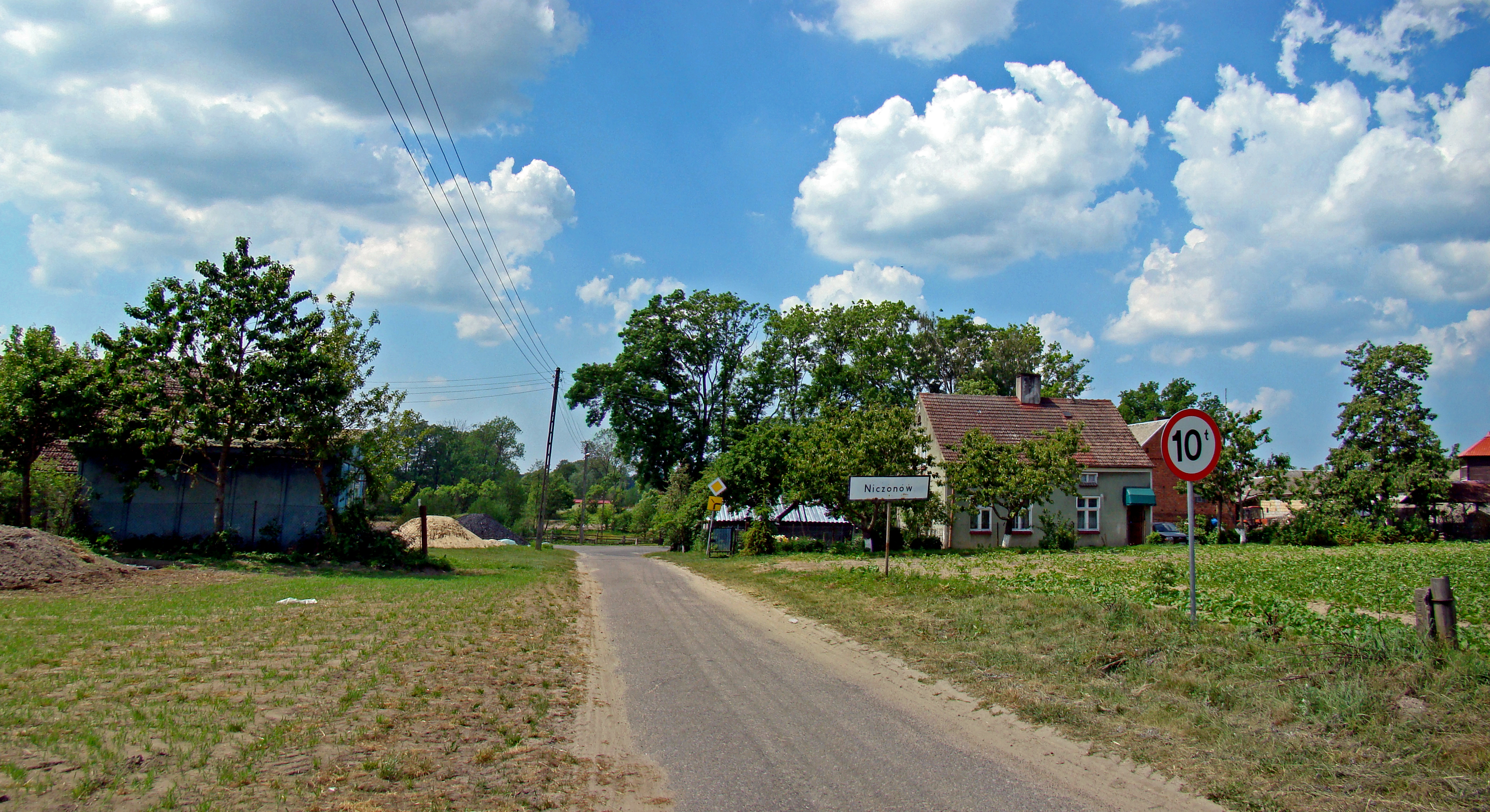

- Location within Poland
- Coordinates: 54°1′3″N 15°0′17″E
- Country: Poland
- Voivodeship: West Pomeranian
- County: Gryfice
- Gmina: Karnice

Niczonów [niˈt͡ʂɔnuf] (German: Nitznow) is a village in the administrative district of Gmina Karnice, within Gryfice County, West Pomeranian Voivodeship, in northwestern Poland. It is approximately 4 km (2 mi) south-west of Karnice, 18 km (11 mi) northwest of Gryfice, and 73 km (45 mi) northeast of the regional capital Szczecin.

== Climate ==
The climate is moderately continental with warm summers and moderately cold winters. The warmest month of the year is July (March) and the coldest is January (February).

== See also ==
- History of Pomerania – history of the region
