= Kusin =

- Village
- Location within Poland
- Coordinates: 54°2′58″N 15°6′18″E
- Country: Poland
- Voivodeship: West Pomeranian
- County: Gryfice
- Gmina: Karnice

Kusin [ˈkuɕin] (German: Küssin) is a village in the administrative district of Gmina Karnice, within Gryfice County, West Pomeranian Voivodeship, in north-western Poland. It lies approximately 4 km (2 mi) north-east of Karnice, 17 km (11 mi) north of Gryfice, and 79 km (49 mi) north-east of the regional capital Szczecin.

For the history of the region, see History of Pomerania.
