= Modlimowo, Gmina Płoty =

Modlimowo
- Village
- Location within Poland
- Coordinates: 53°51′40″N 15°20′0″E
- Country: Poland
- Voivodeship: West Pomeranian
- County: Gryfice
- Gmina: Płoty

Modlimowo [mɔdliˈmɔvɔ] (German: Muddelmow) is a village in the administrative district of Gmina Płoty, within Gryfice County, West Pomeranian Voivodeship, in north-western Poland. It lies approximately 8 km (5 mi) north-east of Płoty, 11 km (7 mi) south-east of Gryfice, and 70 km (43 mi) north-east of the regional capital Szczecin.

For the history of the region, see History of Pomerania.
