= Wicimiczki =

- Village
- Location within Poland
- Coordinates: 53°51′36″N 15°22′51″E
- Country: Poland
- Voivodeship: West Pomeranian
- County: Gryfice
- Gmina: Płoty

Wicimiczki [vit͡ɕiˈmit͡ʂki] (German: Neu Witzmitz) is a village in the administrative district of Gmina Płoty, within Gryfice County, West Pomeranian Voivodeship, in north-western Poland. It lies approximately 10 km (6 mi) north-east of Płoty, 14 km (9 mi) south-east of Gryfice, and 73 km (45 mi) north-east of the regional capital Szczecin.

For the history of the region, see History of Pomerania.
