= Potuliniec =

- Village
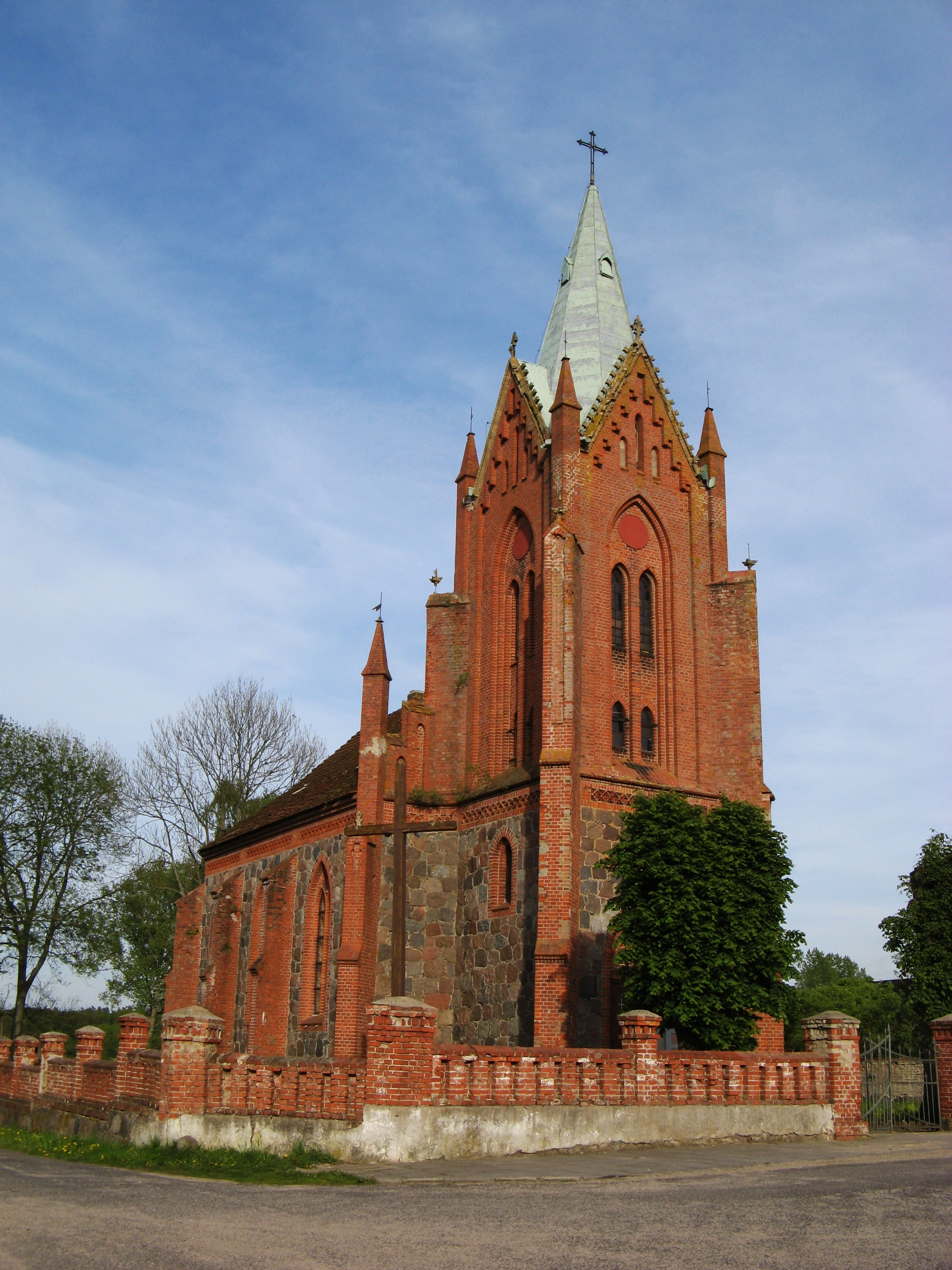
- Our Lady of the Rosary church in Potuliniec

- Location within Poland
- Coordinates: 53°46′10″N 15°12′10″E
- Country: Poland
- Voivodeship: West Pomeranian
- County: Gryfice
- Gmina: Płoty
- Time zone: UTC+1 (CET)
  - Summer (DST): UTC+2 (CEST)
- Vehicle registration: ZGY

Potuliniec [pɔtuˈliɲɛt͡s] is a village in the administrative district of Gmina Płoty, within Gryfice County, West Pomeranian Voivodeship, in north-western Poland. It lies approximately 6 km (4 mi) south-west of Płoty, 17 km (11 mi) south of Gryfice, and 57 km (35 mi) north-east of the regional capital Szczecin.

== History ==
The territory became part of the emerging Polish state under its first ruler Mieszko I around 967. Following the fragmentation of Poland, it was part of the Duchy of Pomerania.

During World War II, the German administration operated a forced labour subcamp of the prison in Goleniów in the village.

== Transport ==
The Polish S6 highway passes nearby, east of Potuliniec.
