= Dąbie, Gryfice County =

Dąbie
- Settlement
- Location within Poland
- Coordinates: 53°50′48″N 15°21′40″E
- Country: Poland
- Voivodeship: West Pomeranian
- County: Gryfice
- Gmina: Płoty

Dąbie [ˈdɔmbjɛ] (German: Woldenburg) is a settlement in the administrative district of Gmina Płoty, within Gryfice County, West Pomeranian Voivodeship, in north-western Poland. It lies approximately 8 km (5 mi) north-east of Płoty, 14 km (9 mi) south-east of Gryfice, and 71 km (44 mi) north-east of the regional capital Szczecin.
