= Grąd, West Pomeranian Voivodeship =

Grąd
- Village
- Location within Poland
- Coordinates: 53°57′2″N 15°25′50″E
- Country: Poland
- Voivodeship: West Pomeranian
- County: Gryfice
- Gmina: Brojce
- Population: 54

Grąd [ɡrɔnt] (German: Grandhof) is a village in the administrative district of Gmina Brojce, within Gryfice County, West Pomeranian Voivodeship, in north-western Poland. It lies approximately 5 km (3 mi) east of Brojce, 16 km (10 mi) east of Gryfice, and 82 km (51 mi) north-east of the regional capital Szczecin.

The village has a population of 54.
