= Cieszyce, West Pomeranian Voivodeship =

Cieszyce
- Village
- Location within Poland
- Coordinates: 53°58′4″N 15°21′33″E
- Country: Poland
- Voivodeship: West Pomeranian
- County: Gryfice
- Gmina: Brojce
- Population: 42

Cieszyce [t͡ɕɛˈʂɨt͡sɛ] (German: Karolinenhof) is a village in the administrative district of Gmina Brojce, within Gryfice County, West Pomeranian Voivodeship, in north-western Poland. It lies approximately 2 km (1 mi) north-west of Brojce, 13 km (8 mi) north-east of Gryfice, and 80 km (50 mi) north-east of the regional capital Szczecin.

Before 1637 the area was part of Duchy of Pomerania. For the history of the region, see History of Pomerania.

The village has a population of 42.
