= Łęczna, West Pomeranian Voivodeship =

Łęczna
- Village
- Location within Poland
- Coordinates: 53°48′16″N 15°9′19″E
- Country: Poland
- Voivodeship: West Pomeranian
- County: Gryfice
- Gmina: Płoty
- Time zone: UTC+1 (CET)
  - Summer (DST): UTC+2 (CEST)
- Area code: +48 91
- Vehicle registration: ZGY

Łęczna [ˈwɛnt͡ʂna] (German: Henningswalde) is a village in the administrative district of Gmina Płoty, within Gryfice County, West Pomeranian Voivodeship, in north-western Poland. It lies approximately 8 km (5 mi) west of Płoty, 13 km (8 mi) south of Gryfice, and 58 km (36 mi) north-east of the regional capital Szczecin. It is located within the historic region of Pomerania.

From 1871 to 1945 the area was part of Germany. From 1975 to 1998 Łęczna was located within the Szczecin Voivodeship.
