= Gostyń Łobeski =

- Village
- Location within Poland
- Coordinates: 53°49′46″N 15°20′10″E
- Country: Poland
- Voivodeship: West Pomeranian
- County: Gryfice
- Gmina: Płoty

Gostyń Łobeski [ˈɡɔstɨɲ wɔˈbɛski] (German: Justin) is a village in the administrative district of Gmina Płoty, within Gryfice County, West Pomeranian Voivodeship, in north-western Poland. It lies approximately 6 km (4 mi) north-east of Płoty, 14 km (9 mi) south-east of Gryfice, and 68 km (42 mi) north-east of the regional capital Szczecin.
