= Bielikowo =

- Village
- Location within Poland
- Coordinates: 53°59′27″N 15°18′55″E
- Country: Poland
- Voivodeship: West Pomeranian
- County: Gryfice
- Gmina: Brojce
- Population: 252

Bielikowo [bjɛliˈkɔvɔ] (German Behlkow) is a village in the administrative district of Gmina Brojce, within Gryfice County, West Pomeranian Voivodeship, in north-western Poland. It lies approximately 6 km (4 mi) north-west of Brojce, 12 km (7 mi) north-east of Gryfice, and 80 km (50 mi) north-east of the regional capital Szczecin.

Before 1637 the area was part of Duchy of Pomerania. For the history of the region, see History of Pomerania.

The village has a population of 252.
