= Gościmierz =

- Village
- Location within Poland
- Coordinates: 53°59′27″N 15°6′28″E
- Country: Poland
- Voivodeship: West Pomeranian
- County: Gryfice
- Gmina: Karnice

Gościmierz (Polish: [ɡɔɕˈt͡ɕimjɛʂ]; German: Gedde) is a village in the administrative district of Gmina Karnice, within Gryfice County, West Pomeranian Voivodeship, in north-western Poland. It lies approximately 6 km (4 mi) south-east of Karnice, 11 km (7 mi) north-west of Gryfice, and 73 km (45 mi) north-east of the regional capital Szczecin.

== See also ==
- History of Pomerania
