= Wytok, West Pomeranian Voivodeship =

Wytok
- Village
- Location within Poland
- Coordinates: 53°50′8″N 15°7′36″E
- Country: Poland
- Voivodeship: West Pomeranian
- County: Gryfice
- Gmina: Płoty

Wytok [ˈvɨtɔk] (German: Fier) is a village in the administrative district of Gmina Płoty, within Gryfice County, West Pomeranian Voivodeship, in north-western Poland. It lies approximately 10 km (6 mi) west of Płoty, 10 km (6 mi) south-west of Gryfice, and 59 km (37 mi) north-east of the regional capital Szczecin.

For the history of the region, see History of Pomerania.
