= Darszyce =

- Village
- Location within Poland
- Coordinates: 53°52′56″N 15°27′5″E
- Country: Poland
- Voivodeship: West Pomeranian
- County: Gryfice
- Gmina: Płoty

Darszyce [darˈʂɨt͡sɛ] (German: Buchwald) is a village in the administrative district of Gmina Płoty, within Gryfice County, West Pomeranian Voivodeship, in north-western Poland. It lies approximately 15 km (9 mi) north-east of Płoty, 17 km (11 mi) east of Gryfice, and 78 km (48 mi) north-east of the regional capital Szczecin.
