= Czaplin Mały =

- Village
- Location within Poland
- Coordinates: 54°2′18″N 15°9′12″E
- Country: Poland
- Voivodeship: West Pomeranian
- County: Gryfice
- Gmina: Karnice

Czaplin Mały [ˈt͡ʂaplin ˈmawɨ] (German: Klein Zapplin) is a village in the administrative district of Gmina Karnice, within Gryfice County, West Pomeranian Voivodeship, in north-western Poland. It lies approximately 7 km (4 mi) east of Karnice, 15 km (9 mi) north of Gryfice, and 79 km (49 mi) north-east of the regional capital Szczecin.

For the history of the region, see History of Pomerania.
