= Stołąż =

- Village
- Location within Poland
- Coordinates: 53°56′0″N 15°21′8″E
- Country: Poland
- Voivodeship: West Pomeranian
- County: Gryfice
- Gmina: Brojce
- Population: 139

Stołąż [ˈstɔwɔ̃ʂ] (German: Stölitz) is a village in the administrative district of Gmina Brojce, within Gryfice County, West Pomeranian Voivodeship, in north-western Poland. It lies approximately 3 km (2 mi) south of Brojce, 11 km (7 mi) east of Gryfice, and 77 km (48 mi) north-east of the regional capital Szczecin.

The village has a population of 139.
