= Skalno, Gryfice County =

Skalno
- Village
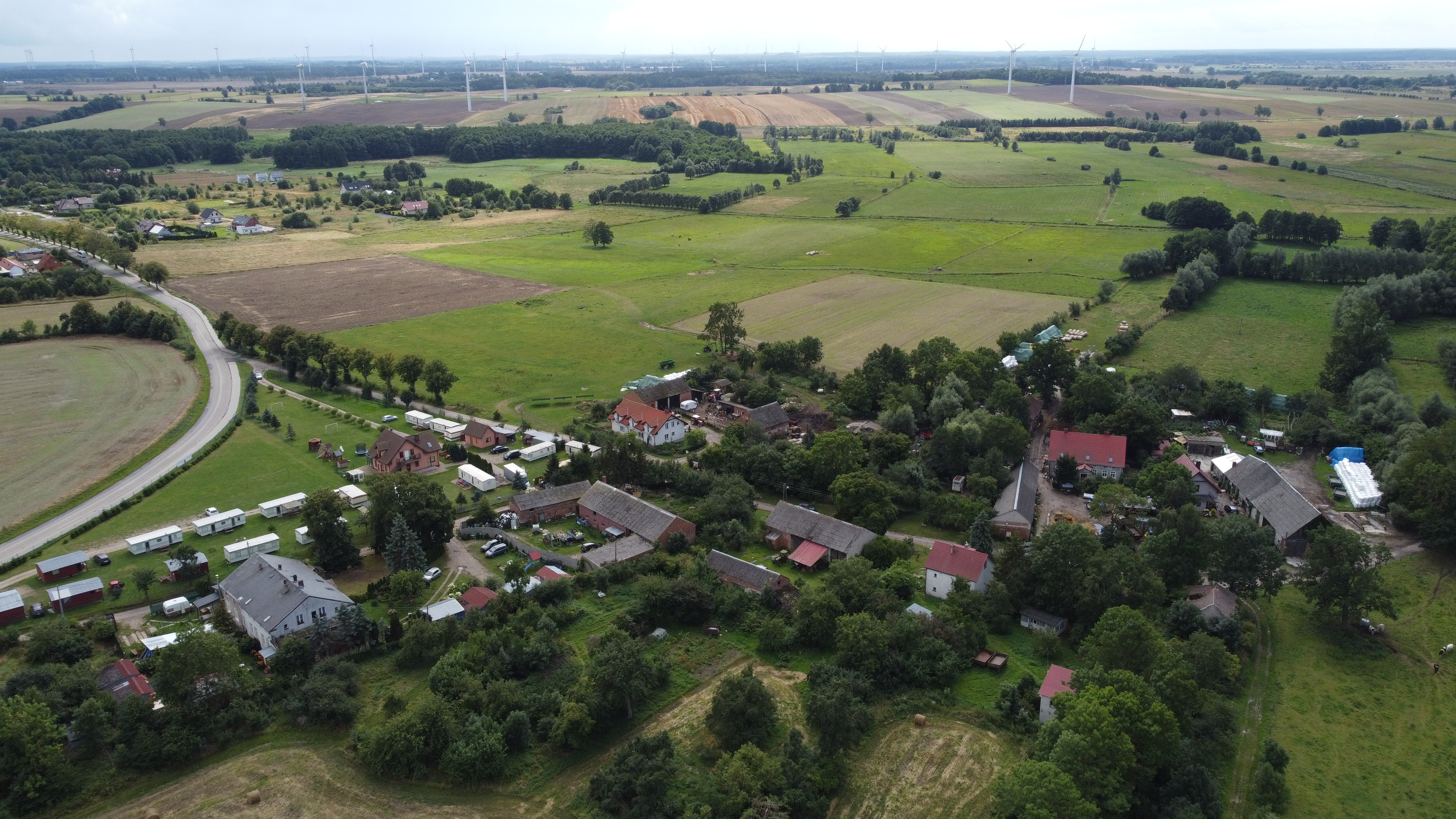
- Aerial view of Skalno

- Location within Poland
- Coordinates: 54°4′55″N 15°6′24″E
- Country: Poland
- Voivodeship: West Pomeranian
- County: Gryfice
- Gmina: Karnice
- Time zone: UTC+1 (CET)
  - Summer (DST): UTC+2 (CEST)
- Vehicle registration: ZGY

Skalno [ˈskalnɔ] is a village in the administrative district of Gmina Karnice, within Gryfice County, West Pomeranian Voivodeship, in north-western Poland. It lies approximately 7 km (4 mi) north-east of Karnice, 20 km (12 mi) north of Gryfice, and 82 km (51 mi) north-east of the regional capital Szczecin. It is situated on the south-eastern shore of Liwia Łuża Lake.

Six Polish citizens were murdered by Nazi Germany in the village during World War II.
