= Czarne, West Pomeranian Voivodeship =

Czarne
- Village
- Location within Poland
- Coordinates: 53°46′N 15°18′E
- Country: Poland
- Voivodeship: West Pomeranian
- County: Gryfice
- Gmina: Płoty

Czarne [ˈt͡ʂarnɛ] (German: Neuenhagen) is a village in the administrative district of Gmina Płoty, within Gryfice County, West Pomeranian Voivodeship, in north-western Poland. It lies approximately 6 km (4 mi) south-east of Płoty, 18 km (11 mi) south of Gryfice, and 62 km (39 mi) north-east of the regional capital Szczecin.
