= Smokęcino =

- Village
- Location within Poland
- Coordinates: 53°56′1″N 15°26′50″E
- Country: Poland
- Voivodeship: West Pomeranian
- County: Gryfice
- Gmina: Brojce
- Population: 93

Smokęcino [smɔkɛnˈt͡ɕinɔ] (German: Schmuckenthin) is a village in the administrative district of Gmina Brojce, within Gryfice County, West Pomeranian Voivodeship, in north-western Poland. It lies approximately 6 km (4 mi) south-east of Brojce, 17 km (11 mi) east of Gryfice, and 81 km (50 mi) north-east of the regional capital Szczecin.

The village has a population of 93.
