= Wilczyniec, West Pomeranian Voivodeship =

Wilczyniec
- Village
- Location within Poland
- Coordinates: 53°47′25″N 15°15′19″E
- Country: Poland
- Voivodeship: West Pomeranian
- County: Gryfice
- Gmina: Płoty

Wilczyniec [vilˈt͡ʂɨɲɛt͡s] (German: Wilksfreude) is a village in the administrative district of Gmina Płoty, within Gryfice County, West Pomeranian Voivodeship, in north-western Poland. It lies approximately 3 km (2 mi) south of Płoty, 15 km (9 mi) south of Gryfice, and 61 km (38 mi) north-east of the regional capital Szczecin.

== See also ==
- History of Pomerania
