= Dargosław, West Pomeranian Voivodeship =

Dargosław
- Village
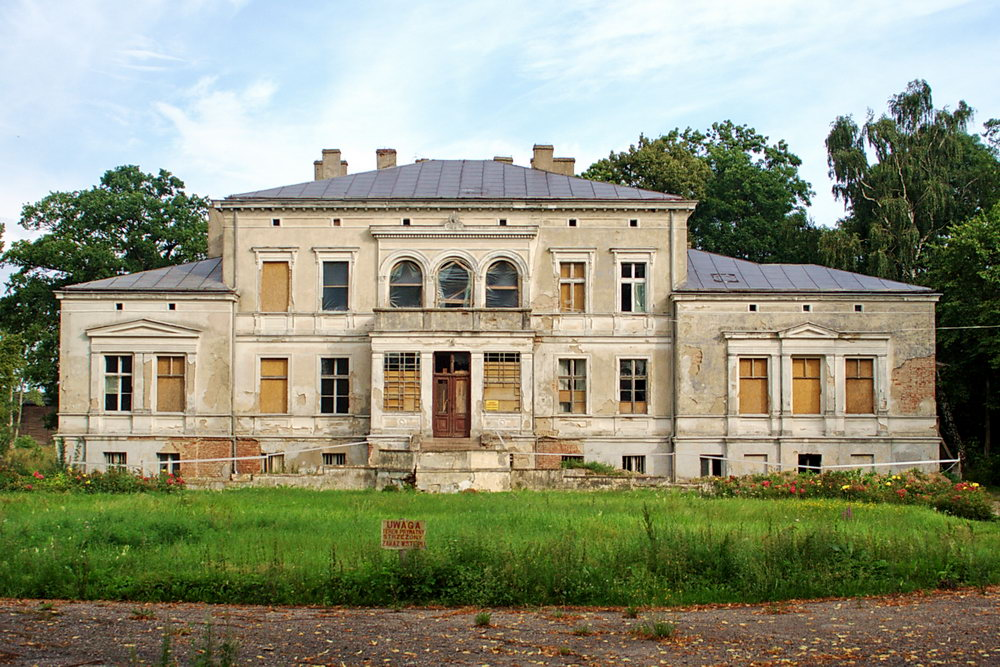
- Palace

- Location within Poland
- Coordinates: 54°0′0″N 15°22′55″E
- Country: Poland
- Voivodeship: West Pomeranian
- County: Gryfice
- Gmina: Brojce
- Population: 333
- Time zone: UTC+1 (CET)
  - Summer (DST): UTC+2 (CEST)
- Vehicle registration: ZGY

Dargosław [darˈɡɔswaf] (German: Dargislaff) is a village in the administrative district of Gmina Brojce, within Gryfice County, West Pomeranian Voivodeship, in north-western Poland. It lies approximately 5 km (3 mi) north of Brojce, 16 km (10 mi) north-east of Gryfice, and 84 km (52 mi) north-east of the regional capital Szczecin.

The village has a population of 333.

== History ==
The area became part of the emerging Polish state under its first historic ruler Mieszko I around 967. Following the fragmentation of Poland, it formed part of the Duchy of Pomerania. From the 18th century, it formed part of Prussia, and from 1871 to 1945 it was also part of Germany. During World War II, in February 1945, a German-perpetrated death march of Allied prisoners-of-war from the Stalag XX-B POW camp passed through the village.
