= Łowiska =

- Village
- Location within Poland
- Coordinates: 53°47′42″N 15°19′17″E
- Country: Poland
- Voivodeship: West Pomeranian
- County: Gryfice
- Gmina: Płoty

Łowiska [wɔˈviska] (original German: Mittelhagen) is a village in the administrative district of Gmina Płoty, within Gryfice County, West Pomeranian Voivodeship, in north-western Poland. It lies approximately 4 km (2 mi) east of Płoty, 16 km (10 mi) south-east of Gryfice, and 65 km (40 mi) north-east of the regional capital Szczecin.

For the history of the region, see History of Pomerania.
