= Jarzysław, Gryfice County =

Jarzysław
- Village
- Location within Poland
- Coordinates: 53°47′N 15°17′E
- Country: Poland
- Voivodeship: West Pomeranian
- County: Gryfice
- Gmina: Płoty

Jarzysław [jaˈʐɨswaf] (German: Stadthof) is a village in the administrative district of Gmina Płoty, within Gryfice County, West Pomeranian Voivodeship, in north-western Poland. It lies a few kilometres south-east of Płoty.
