= Uniestowo =

- Village
- Location within Poland
- Coordinates: 54°1′6″N 15°23′21″E
- Country: Poland
- Voivodeship: West Pomeranian
- County: Gryfice
- Gmina: Brojce
- Population: 63

Uniestowo [uɲɛsˈtɔvɔ] (German: Nestau) is a village in the administrative district of Gmina Brojce, within Gryfice County, West Pomeranian Voivodeship, in north-western Poland. It lies approximately 7 km (4 mi) north of Brojce, 17 km (11 mi) north-east of Gryfice, and 86 km (53 mi) north-east of the regional capital Szczecin.

The village has a population of 63.
