= Mołstówko =

- Village
- Location within Poland
- Coordinates: 53°59′10″N 15°21′52″E
- Country: Poland
- Voivodeship: West Pomeranian
- County: Gryfice
- Gmina: Brojce
- Population: 12

Mołstówko [mɔu̯sˈtufkɔ] is a village in the administrative district of Gmina Brojce, within Gryfice County, West Pomeranian Voivodeship, in north-western Poland. It lies approximately 4 km (2 mi) north of Brojce, 14 km (9 mi) north-east of Gryfice, and 82 km (51 mi) north-east of the regional capital Szczecin.

The village has a population of 12.
