= Wyszogóra =

- Settlement
- Location within Poland
- Coordinates: 53°44′53″N 15°13′32″E
- Country: Poland
- Voivodeship: West Pomeranian
- County: Gryfice
- Gmina: Płoty

Wyszogóra [vɨʂɔˈɡura] (German: Piepenburg) is a settlement in the administrative district of Gmina Płoty, within Gryfice County, West Pomeranian Voivodeship, in north-western Poland. It lies approximately 8 km (5 mi) south of Płoty, 19 km (12 mi) south of Gryfice, and 57 km (35 mi) north-east of the regional capital Szczecin.

The village was known in German as Piepenburg.

== See also ==
- History of Pomerania
