= Mechowo, Gryfice County =

Mechowo
- Village
- Location within Poland
- Coordinates: 53°49′14″N 15°10′7″E
- Country: Poland
- Voivodeship: West Pomeranian
- County: Gryfice
- Gmina: Płoty

Mechowo [mɛˈxɔvɔ] (German: Zimmerhausen) is a village in the administrative district of Gmina Płoty, within Gryfice County, West Pomeranian Voivodeship, in north-western Poland. It lies approximately 7 km (4 mi) west of Płoty, 11 km (7 mi) south of Gryfice, and 60 km (37 mi) north-east of the regional capital Szczecin.

For the history of the region, see History of Pomerania and History of Gryfice.
