= Pniewko, Gryfice County =

Pniewko
- Village
- Location within Poland
- Coordinates: 53°53′54″N 15°24′52″E
- Country: Poland
- Voivodeship: West Pomeranian
- County: Gryfice
- Gmina: Płoty

Pniewko [ˈpɲɛfkɔ] is a village in the administrative district of Gmina Płoty, within Gryfice County, West Pomeranian Voivodeship, in north-western Poland. It lies approximately 15 km (9 mi) north-east of Płoty, 15 km (9 mi) east of Gryfice, and 77 km (48 mi) north-east of the regional capital Szczecin.

For the history of the region, see History of Pomerania.
