= Gardomino =

- Settlement
- Location within Poland
- Coordinates: 53°50′19″N 15°9′31″E
- Country: Poland
- Voivodeship: West Pomeranian
- County: Gryfice
- Gmina: Płoty

Gardomino [ɡardɔˈminɔ] (German: Kardemin) is a settlement in the administrative district of Gmina Płoty, within Gryfice County, West Pomeranian Voivodeship, in north-western Poland. It lies approximately 8 km (5 mi) north-west of Płoty, 9 km (6 mi) south of Gryfice, and 61 km (38 mi) north-east of the regional capital Szczecin.
