= Makowice, West Pomeranian Voivodeship =

Makowice
- Village
- Location within Poland
- Coordinates: 53°46′N 15°16′E
- Country: Poland
- Voivodeship: West Pomeranian
- County: Gryfice
- Gmina: Płoty

Makowice [makɔˈvit͡sɛ] (German: Mackfitz) is a village in the administrative district of Gmina Płoty, within Gryfice County, West Pomeranian Voivodeship, in north-western Poland. It lies approximately 5 km (3 mi) south of Płoty, 18 km (11 mi) south of Gryfice, and 60 km (37 mi) north-east of the regional capital Szczecin.

For the history of the region, see History of Pomerania.
