= Charnowo, West Pomeranian Voivodeship =

Charnowo
- Village
- Location within Poland
- Coordinates: 53°53′59″N 15°18′57″E
- Country: Poland
- Voivodeship: West Pomeranian
- County: Gryfice
- Gmina: Płoty

Charnowo [xarˈnɔvɔ] (German: Ostenhagen) is a village in the administrative district of Gmina Płoty, within Gryfice County, West Pomeranian Voivodeship, in north-western Poland. It lies approximately 11 km (7 mi) north of Płoty, 8 km (5 mi) east of Gryfice, and 73 km (45 mi) north-east of the regional capital Szczecin.
