= Pniewo, Gryfice County =

Pniewo
- Village
- Location within Poland
- Coordinates: 53°54′16″N 15°25′54″E
- Country: Poland
- Voivodeship: West Pomeranian
- County: Gryfice
- Gmina: Płoty

Pniewo [ˈpɲɛvɔ] (German: Pinnow) is a village in the administrative district of Gmina Płoty, within Gryfice County, West Pomeranian Voivodeship, in north-western Poland. It lies approximately 16 km (10 mi) north-east of Płoty, 16 km (10 mi) east of Gryfice, and 78 km (48 mi) north-east of the regional capital Szczecin.

For the history of the region, see History of Pomerania.
