= Natolewiczki =

- Village
- Location within Poland
- Coordinates: 53°54′27″N 15°21′7″E
- Country: Poland
- Voivodeship: West Pomeranian
- County: Gryfice
- Gmina: Płoty

Natolewiczki [natɔlɛˈvit͡ʂki] (German: Neu Natelfitz) is a village in the administrative district of Gmina Płoty, within Gryfice County, West Pomeranian Voivodeship, in north-western Poland. It lies approximately 13 km (8 mi) north-east of Płoty, 11 km (7 mi) east of Gryfice, and 75 km (47 mi) north-east of the regional capital Szczecin.

For the history of the region, see History of Pomerania.
