= Dreżewo =

- Village
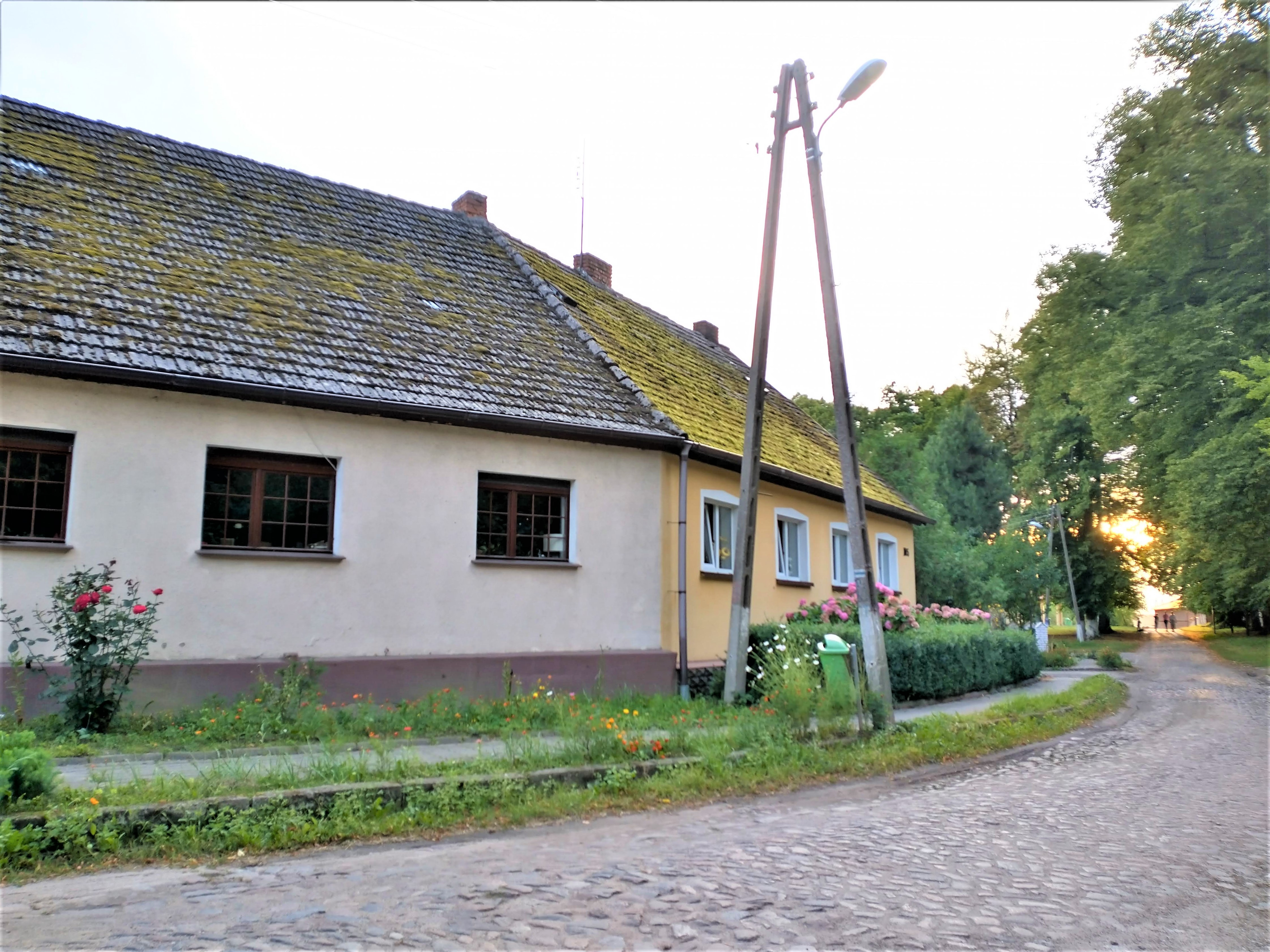

- Location within Poland
- Coordinates: 54°3′49″N 14°59′26″E
- Country: Poland
- Voivodeship: West Pomeranian
- County: Gryfice
- Gmina: Karnice
- Population: 150
- Time zone: UTC+1 (CET)
  - Summer (DST): UTC+2 (CEST)
- Vehicle registration: ZGY

Dreżewo [drɛˈʐɛvɔ] (German: Dresow) is a village in the administrative district of Gmina Karnice, within Gryfice County, West Pomeranian Voivodeship, in north-western Poland. It lies approximately 6 km (4 mi) north-west of Karnice, 22 km (14 mi) north-west of Gryfice, and 77 km (48 mi) north of the regional capital Szczecin.

It is located in the historic region of Pomerania.

The village has a population of 150.
