= Niwy, West Pomeranian Voivodeship =

Niwy
- Settlement
- Location within Poland
- Coordinates: 54°2′16″N 15°0′20″E
- Country: Poland
- Voivodeship: West Pomeranian
- County: Gryfice
- Gmina: Karnice

Niwy [ˈnivɨ] (German: Haideschäferei) is a settlement in the administrative district of Gmina Karnice, within Gryfice County, West Pomeranian Voivodeship, in north-western Poland. It lies approximately 4 km (2 mi) west of Karnice, 19 km (12 mi) north-west of Gryfice, and 75 km (47 mi) north of the regional capital Szczecin.

For the history of the region, see History of Pomerania.
