= Czaplice, Gryfice County =

Czaplice
- Village
- Location within Poland
- Coordinates: 54°2′27″N 15°7′59″E
- Country: Poland
- Voivodeship: West Pomeranian
- County: Gryfice
- Gmina: Karnice

Czaplice [t͡ʂaˈplit͡sɛ] (formerly German: Neu Zapplin) is a village in the administrative district of Gmina Karnice, within Gryfice County, West Pomeranian Voivodeship, in north-western Poland. It lies approximately 6 km (4 mi) east of Karnice, 15 km (9 mi) north of Gryfice, and 79 km (49 mi) north-east of the regional capital Szczecin.

For the history of the region, see History of Pomerania.
