= Natolewice =

- Village
- Location within Poland
- Coordinates: 53°54′14″N 15°22′13″E
- Country: Poland
- Voivodeship: West Pomeranian
- County: Gryfice
- Gmina: Płoty
- Population (approx.): 300

Natolewice [natɔlɛˈvit͡sɛ] (German: Natelfitz) is a village in the administrative district of Gmina Płoty, within Gryfice County, West Pomeranian Voivodeship, in north-western Poland. It lies approximately 13 km (8 mi) north-east of Płoty, 12 km (7 mi) east of Gryfice, and 75 km (47 mi) north-east of the regional capital Szczecin.

For the history of the region, see History of Pomerania.

The village has an approximate population of 300.
