= Skrobotowo =

- Village
- Location within Poland
- Coordinates: 54°3′2″N 15°4′17″E
- Country: Poland
- Voivodeship: West Pomeranian
- County: Gryfice
- Gmina: Karnice

Skrobotowo [skrɔbɔˈtɔvɔ] (German: Schruptow) is a village in the administrative district of Gmina Karnice, within Gryfice County, West Pomeranian Voivodeship, in northwestern Poland. It lies approximately 3 km (2 mi) northeast of Karnice, 18 km (11 mi) northwest of Gryfice, and 78 km (48 mi) northeast of the regional capital Szczecin.
