= Witomierz =

- Village
- Location within Poland
- Coordinates: 53°59′28″N 15°7′12″E
- Country: Poland
- Voivodeship: West Pomeranian
- County: Gryfice
- Gmina: Karnice

Witomierz [viˈtɔmjɛʂ] (German: Johannishof) is a village in the administrative district of Gmina Karnice, within Gryfice County, West Pomeranian Voivodeship, in north-western Poland. It lies approximately 7 km (4 mi) south-east of Karnice, 10 km (6 mi) north-west of Gryfice, and 73 km (45 mi) north-east of the regional capital Szczecin.
