= Ostrobodno =

- Village
- Location within Poland
- Coordinates: 53°52′55″N 15°27′27″E
- Country: Poland
- Voivodeship: West Pomeranian
- County: Gryfice
- Gmina: Płoty

Ostrobodno [ɔstrɔˈbɔdnɔ] (German: Ostenheide) is a village in the administrative district of Gmina Płoty, within Gryfice County, West Pomeranian Voivodeship, in north-western Poland. It lies approximately 16 km (10 mi) north-east of Płoty, 18 km (11 mi) east of Gryfice, and 78 km (48 mi) north-east of the regional capital Szczecin.
