= Słudwia, West Pomeranian Voivodeship =

Słudwia
- Village
- Location within Poland
- Coordinates: 53°48′N 15°17′E
- Country: Poland
- Voivodeship: West Pomeranian
- County: Gryfice
- Gmina: Płoty

Słudwia [ˈswudvja] (German: Karolinenhof) is a village in the administrative district of Gmina Płoty, within Gryfice County, West Pomeranian Voivodeship, in north-western Poland. It lies approximately 2 km (1 mi) south-east of Płoty, 14 km (9 mi) south-east of Gryfice, and 63 km (39 mi) north-east of the regional capital Szczecin.

For the history of the region, see History of Pomerania.

== See also ==
- Maurzyce Bridge
