= Paprotno, Gryfice County =

Paprotno
- Village
- Location within Poland
- Coordinates: 53°59′34″N 15°3′47″E
- Country: Poland
- Voivodeship: West Pomeranian
- County: Gryfice
- Gmina: Karnice
- Population: 260

Paprotno ([paˈprɔtnɔ]; German: Parpart) is a village in the administrative district of Gmina Karnice, within Gryfice County, West Pomeranian Voivodeship, in north-western Poland. It lies approximately 5 km (3 mi) south of Karnice, 13 km (8 mi) north-west of Gryfice, and 72 km (45 mi) north-east of the regional capital Szczecin.

The village has a population of 260.
