= Gostyński Bród =

- Settlement
- Location within Poland
- Coordinates: 53°49′44.03″N 15°19′00.96″E
- Country: Poland
- Voivodeship: West Pomeranian
- County: Gryfice
- Gmina: Płoty

Gostyński Bród [ɡɔsˈtɨɲski ˈbrut] (German: Justiner Mühle) is a settlement in the administrative district of Gmina Płoty, within Gryfice County, West Pomeranian Voivodeship, in northwestern Poland.
