= Konarzewo, Gryfice County =

Konarzewo
- Village
- Location within Poland
- Coordinates: 54°4′28″N 15°8′5″E
- Country: Poland
- Voivodeship: West Pomeranian
- County: Gryfice
- Gmina: Karnice

Konarzewo [kɔnaˈʐɛvɔ] (German: Kirchhagen) is a village in the administrative district of Gmina Karnice, within Gryfice County, West Pomeranian Voivodeship, in north-western Poland. It lies approximately 8 km (5 mi) north-east of Karnice, 19 km (12 mi) north of Gryfice, and 82 km (51 mi) north-east of the regional capital Szczecin.

For the history of the region, see History of Pomerania.
