= Mołstowo, Gryfice County =

Mołstowo
- Village
- Location within Poland
- Coordinates: 53°59′19″N 15°21′1″E
- Country: Poland
- Voivodeship: West Pomeranian
- County: Gryfice
- Gmina: Brojce
- Population: 120

Mołstowo [mɔu̯sˈtɔvɔ] (German: Molstow) is a village in the administrative district of Gmina Brojce, within Gryfice County, West Pomeranian Voivodeship, in north-western Poland. It lies approximately 4 km (2 mi) north of Brojce, 13 km (8 mi) north-east of Gryfice, and 82 km (51 mi) north-east of the regional capital Szczecin. The village has a population of 120.
