= Konarzewo =

Konarzewo may refer to the following places:

- Konarzewo, Poznań County in Greater Poland Voivodeship (west-central Poland)
- Konarzewo, Rawicz County in Greater Poland Voivodeship (west-central Poland)
- Konarzewo, Goleniów County in West Pomeranian Voivodeship (north-west Poland)
- Konarzewo, Gryfice County in West Pomeranian Voivodeship (north-west Poland)

== See also ==
- Konarzew (disambiguation)
