= Kopaniny, West Pomeranian Voivodeship =

Kopaniny
- Village
- Location within Poland
- Coordinates: 53°50′45″N 15°22′50″E
- Country: Poland
- Voivodeship: West Pomeranian
- County: Gryfice
- Gmina: Płoty
- Time zone: UTC+01:00 (CET)
  - Summer (DST): UTC+02:00 (CEST)

Kopaniny [kɔpaˈninɨ] (German: Krebskathen) is a village in the administrative district of Gmina Płoty, within Gryfice County, West Pomeranian Voivodeship, in north-western Poland.

For the history of the region, see History of Pomerania.
