= Bucze, West Pomeranian Voivodeship =

Bucze
- Village
- Location within Poland
- Coordinates: 53°54′14″N 15°22′13″E
- Country: Poland
- Voivodeship: West Pomeranian
- County: Gryfice
- Gmina: Płoty

Bucze [ˈbut͡ʂɛ] is a village in the administrative district of Gmina Płoty, within Gryfice County, West Pomeranian Voivodeship, in north-western Poland.
