= Sowno =

Sowno may refer to the following places:

- Sowno, Gryfice County in West Pomeranian Voivodeship (north-west Poland)
- Sowno, Koszalin County in West Pomeranian Voivodeship (north-west Poland)
- Sowno, Stargard County in West Pomeranian Voivodeship (north-west Poland)
