= Kobuz =

Kobuz may refer to:

- Kobuz, Gryfice County, Poland
- Kobuz, Szczecinek County, Poland
- SZD-21 Kobuz, aerobatic glider
