= Darżewo =

Darżewo may refer to the following places:

- Darżewo, Pomeranian Voivodeship (north Poland)
- Darżewo, Gryfice County in West Pomeranian Voivodeship (north-west Poland)
- Darżewo, Koszalin County in West Pomeranian Voivodeship (north-west Poland)
