= Ciećmierz =

- Village
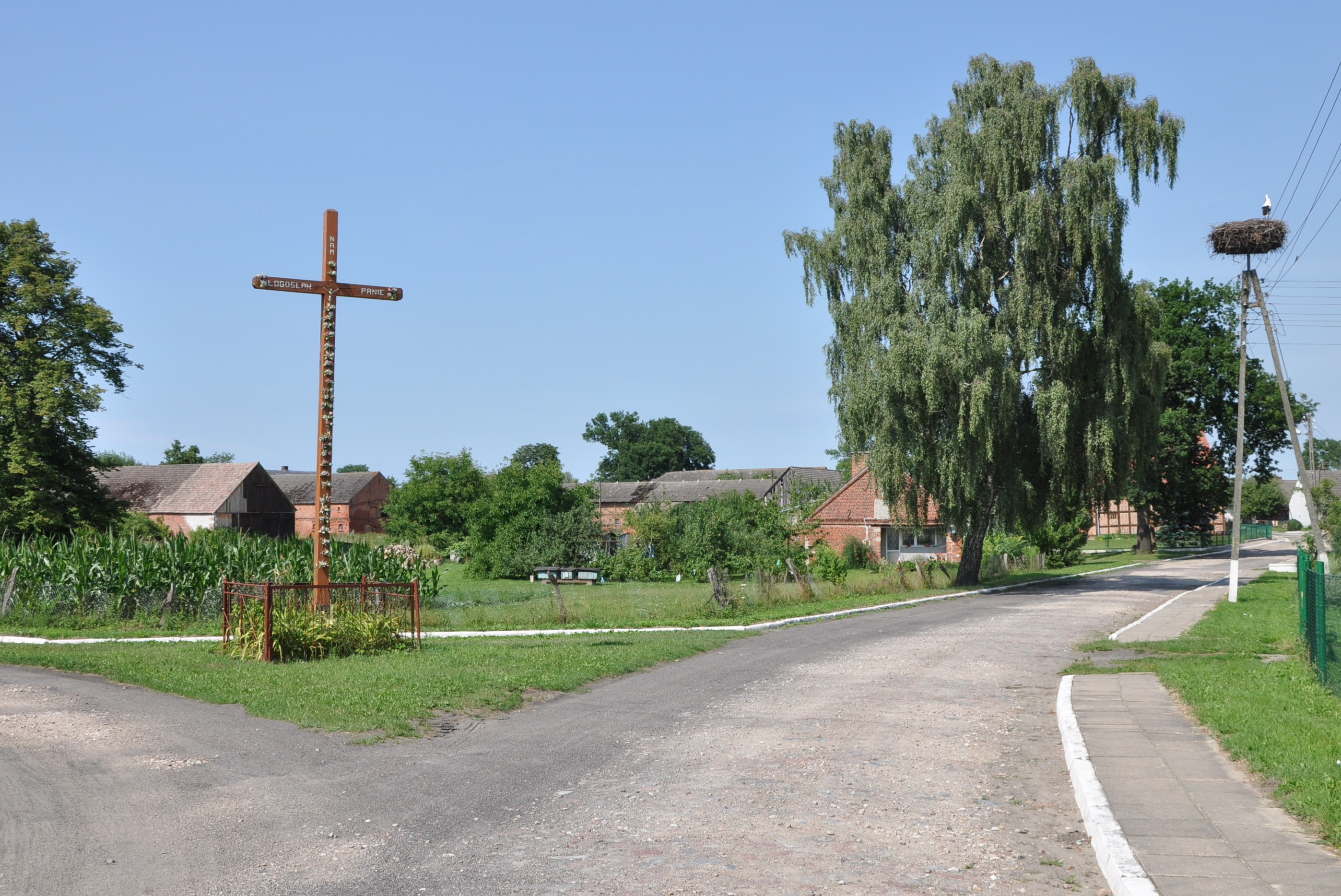
- Cross-roads in Ciećmierz

- Location within Poland
- Coordinates: 53°59′30″N 15°2′1″E
- Country: Poland
- Voivodeship: West Pomeranian
- County: Gryfice
- Gmina: Karnice

Ciećmierz pronounced [ˈt͡ɕɛt͡ɕmjɛʂ] (German: Zitzmar) is a village in the administrative district of Gmina Karnice, within Gryfice County, West Pomeranian Voivodeship, in north-western Poland. It lies approximately 5 km (3 mi) south of Karnice, 14 km (9 mi) north-west of Gryfice, and 71 km (44 mi) north-east of the regional capital Szczecin.

For the history of the region, see History of Pomerania.

== Points of interest ==
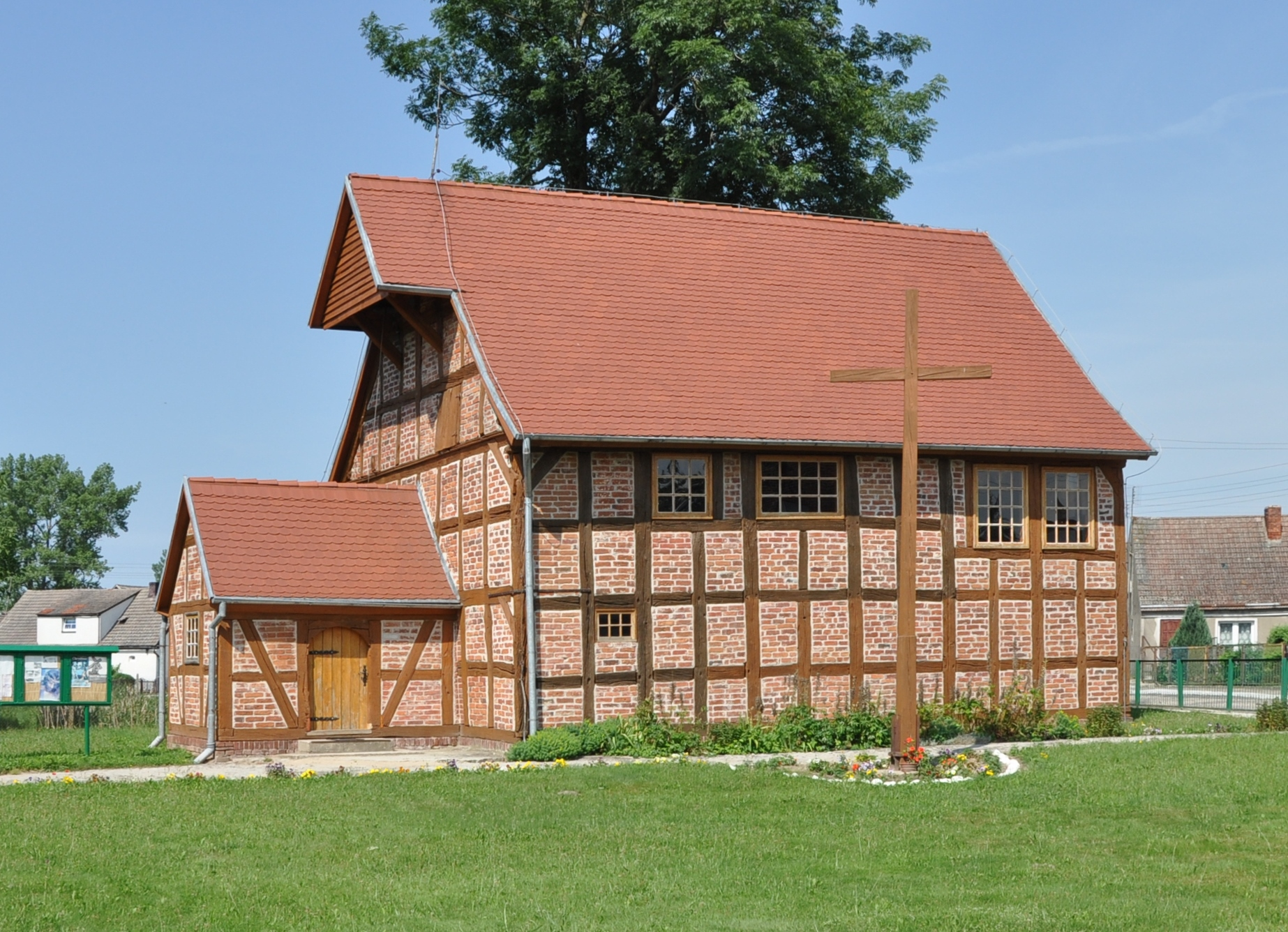
Ciećmierz historic church.
