= Luciąża, West Pomeranian Voivodeship =

Luciąża
- Village
- Location within Poland
- Coordinates: 53°50′09″N 15°21′41″E
- Country: Poland
- Voivodeship: West Pomeranian
- County: Gryfice
- Gmina: Płoty
- Population: 43

Luciąża [luˈt͡ɕɔ̃ʐa] (German: Sack) is a village in the administrative district of Gmina Płoty, within Gryfice County, West Pomeranian Voivodeship, in north-western Poland.

For the history of the region, see History of Pomerania.

The village has a population of 43.
