= Bądkowo =

Bądkowo may refer to the following places:

- Bądkowo, Kuyavian-Pomeranian Voivodeship (north-central Poland)
- Bądkowo, Masovian Voivodeship (east-central Poland)
- Bądkowo, West Pomeranian Voivodeship (north-west Poland)
