= Kłodno, West Pomeranian Voivodeship =

Kłodno
- Village
- Location within Poland
- Coordinates: 53°53′53″N 15°24′51″E
- Country: Poland
- Voivodeship: West Pomeranian
- County: Gryfice
- Gmina: Płoty

Kłodno [ˈkwɔdnɔ] is a village in the administrative district of Gmina Płoty, within Gryfice County, West Pomeranian Voivodeship, in north-western Poland.
