= Dalimierz, Gryfice County =

Dalimierz
- Village
- Location within Poland
- Coordinates: 53°53′07″N 15°26′27″E
- Country: Poland
- Voivodeship: West Pomeranian
- County: Gryfice
- Gmina: Płoty
- Time zone: UTC+01:00 (CET)
  - Summer (DST): UTC+02:00 (CEST)

Dalimierz [daˈlimjɛʂ] (original German: Kurtshagen) is a village in the administrative district of Gmina Płoty, within Gryfice County, West Pomeranian Voivodeship, in north-western Poland.
