= Cerkwica =

- Village
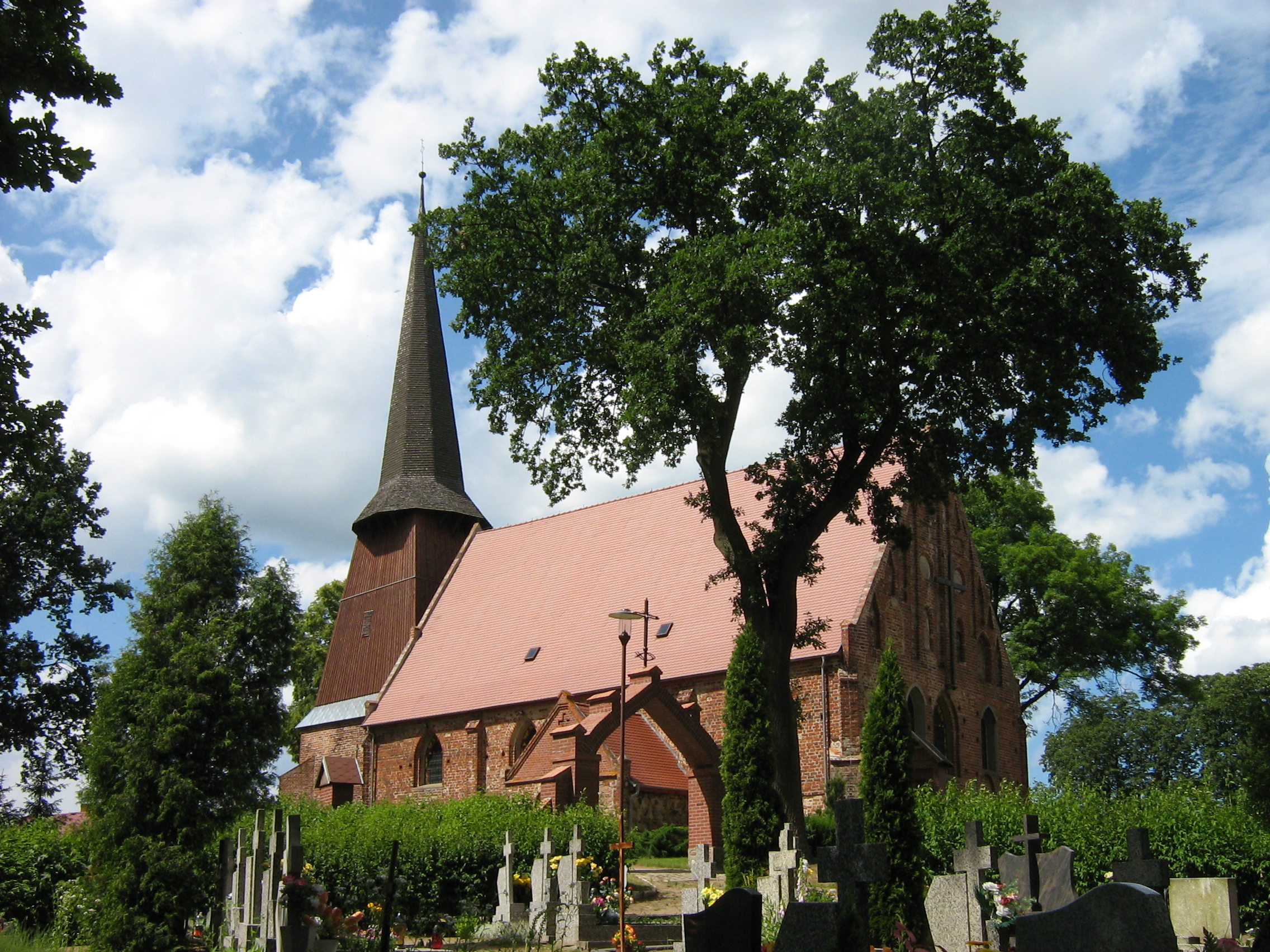
- Church of the Sacred Heart

- Location within Poland
- Coordinates: 54°1′N 15°7′E
- Country: Poland
- Voivodeship: West Pomeranian
- County: Gryfice
- Gmina: Karnice

Population
  - Total: 1,200

Cerkwica pronounced [t͡sɛrkˈfit͡sa] (German Zirkwitz) is a village in the administrative district of Gmina Karnice in Gryfice County, West Pomeranian Voivodeship, in northwestern Poland approximately 5 km (3 mi) southeast of Karnice, 13 km (8 mi) northwest of Gryfice, and 76 km (47 mi) northeast of the regional capital Szczecin.

In 1946–1998 the settlement was a part of the Szczecin Voivodeship. The population in 2004 was 1261 inhabitants.

The Volunteer Fire Department Station in Cerkwica is part of the country-wide system of a volunteer fire department (VFD) outlets. Before 1945 the area was part of Nazi Germany. For the history of the region, see History of Pomerania.
