= Bądkowo, West Pomeranian Voivodeship =

Bądkowo
- Village
- Location within Poland
- Coordinates: 53°51′7″N 15°17′42″E
- Country: Poland
- Voivodeship: West Pomeranian
- County: Gryfice
- Gmina: Płoty

Bądkowo [bɔntˈkɔvɔ] (German: Bandekow) is a village in the administrative district of Gmina Płoty, within Gryfice County, West Pomeranian Voivodeship, in north-western Poland. It lies approximately 6 km (4 mi) north of Płoty, 10 km (6 mi) south-east of Gryfice, and 68 km (42 mi) north-east of the regional capital Szczecin.
