= Sowno, Gryfice County =

Sowno
- Village
- Location within Poland
- Coordinates: 53°48′21″N 15°12′26″E
- Country: Poland
- Voivodeship: West Pomeranian
- County: Gryfice
- Gmina: Płoty

Sowno (Polish pronunciation: [ˈsɔvnɔ]; German: Zowen) is a village in the administrative district of Gmina Płoty, within Gryfice County, West Pomeranian Voivodeship, in north-western Poland. It lies approximately 4 km (2 mi) west of Płoty, 13 km (8 mi) south of Gryfice, and 60 km (37 mi) north-east of the regional capital Szczecin.

For the history of the region, see History of Pomerania and History of Gryfice.
