= Makowiska, West Pomeranian Voivodeship =

Makowiska
- Village
- Location within Poland
- Coordinates: 53°46′49″N 15°16′37″E
- Country: Poland
- Voivodeship: West Pomeranian
- County: Gryfice
- Gmina: Płoty

Makowiska [makɔˈviska] (German: Johannisberg) is a village in the administrative district of Gmina Płoty, within Gryfice County, West Pomeranian Voivodeship, in north-western Poland.

For the history of the region, see History of Pomerania.
