= Krężel =

Krężel may refer to the following places:

- Krężel, Masovian Voivodeship (east-central Poland)
- Krężel, Gryfice County in West Pomeranian Voivodeship (north-west Poland)
- Krężel, Myślibórz County in West Pomeranian Voivodeship (north-west Poland)
