= Gościejewo, West Pomeranian Voivodeship =

Gościejewo
- Village
- Location within Poland
- Coordinates: 53°47′54″N 15°17′31″E
- Country: Poland
- Voivodeship: West Pomeranian
- County: Gryfice
- Gmina: Płoty

Gościejewo (Polish: [ɡɔɕt͡ɕɛˈjɛvɔ]; German: Berndtshof) is a village in the administrative district of Gmina Płoty, within Gryfice County, West Pomeranian Voivodeship, in north-western Poland.
