= Modlimowo, Gmina Karnice =

Modlimowo
- Village
- Location within Poland
- Coordinates: 53°58′33″N 15°05′19″E
- Country: Poland
- Voivodeship: West Pomeranian
- County: Gryfice
- Gmina: Karnice

Modlimowo [mɔdliˈmɔvɔ] (German Muddelmow) is a village in the administrative district of Gmina Karnice, within Gryfice County, West Pomeranian Voivodeship, in north-western Poland.

For the history of the region, see History of Pomerania.
