= Słudwia =

- Słudwia (river), a river in central Poland, left tributary of Bzura
- Słudwia, West Pomeranian Voivodeship, a village in northwestern Poland
