= Hans-Georg von der Osten =

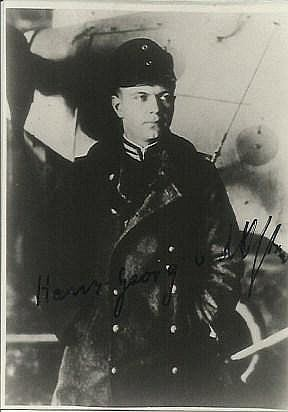
- Born: 9 September 1895; Witzmitz, Pomerania
- Died: 27 March 1987 (aged 91)
- Military career
- Allegiance: Germany
- Branch: Luftstreitkräfte; Luftwaffe
- Rank: Leutnant
- Units: Flieger-Abteilung 38; Jagdstaffel 4
- Commands: Jagdstaffel 11
- Awards: Iron Cross
- Other work: Commanded all Luftwaffe bases in Germany during World War II

Leutnant Hans-Georg August von der Osten (9 September 1895 – 27 March 1987) began his career as a World War I flying ace credited with five aerial victories. He later rose to command of all Luftwaffe bases in Germany, during World War II.

== Biography ==
See also Aerial victory standards of World War I

Hans-Georg von der Osten was born on 9 September 1895 in Witzmitz.

He joined the 3rd Uhlans Regiment early in World War I, on 1 September 1914. On 1 March 1915, he was commissioned as an officer. He transferred to the Air Service on 26 February 1916. Details are lacking about his primary pilot training, but on 1 August he was posted to Fliegerersatz-Abteilung 38 (Replacement Detachment 38) as a flight leader. In November 1916, he went for advanced training to become a fighter pilot.

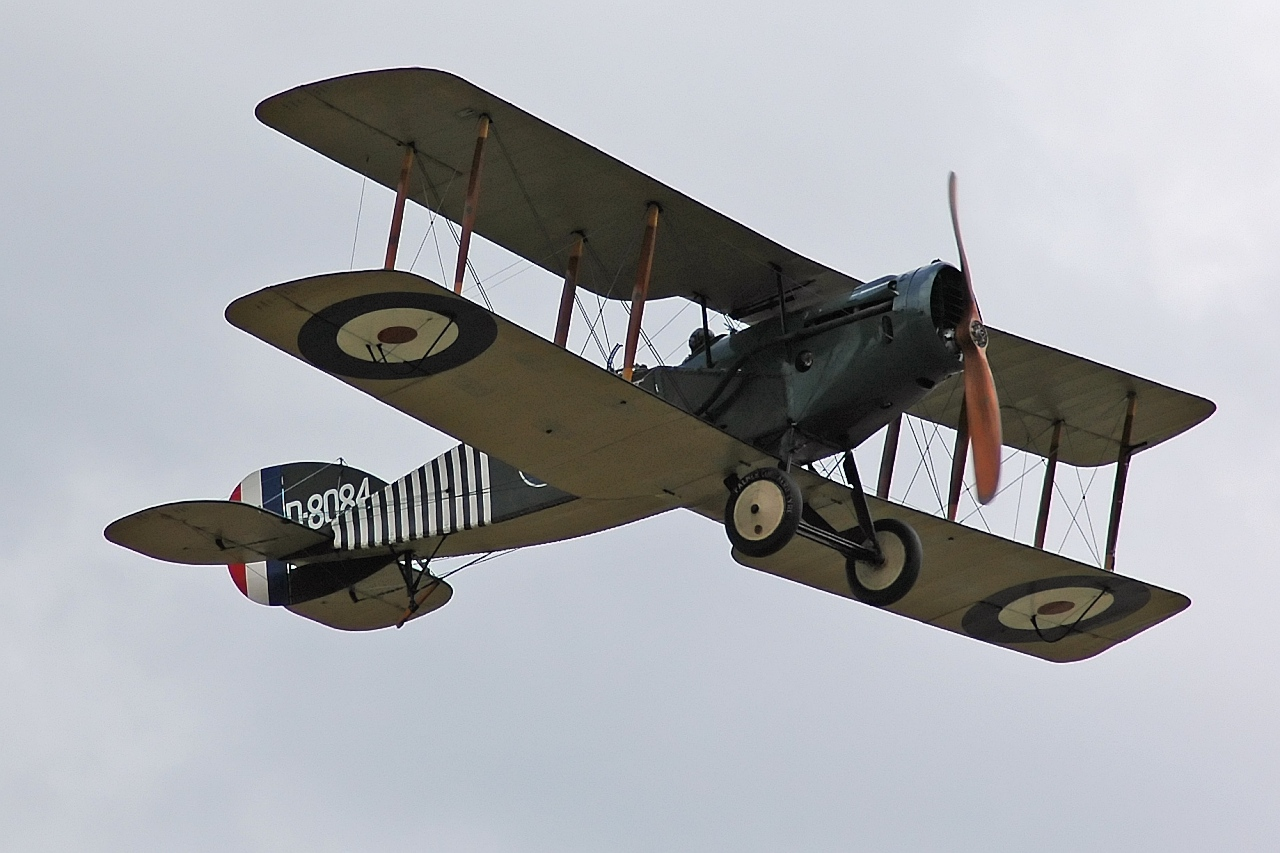
A restored Bristol F2B.

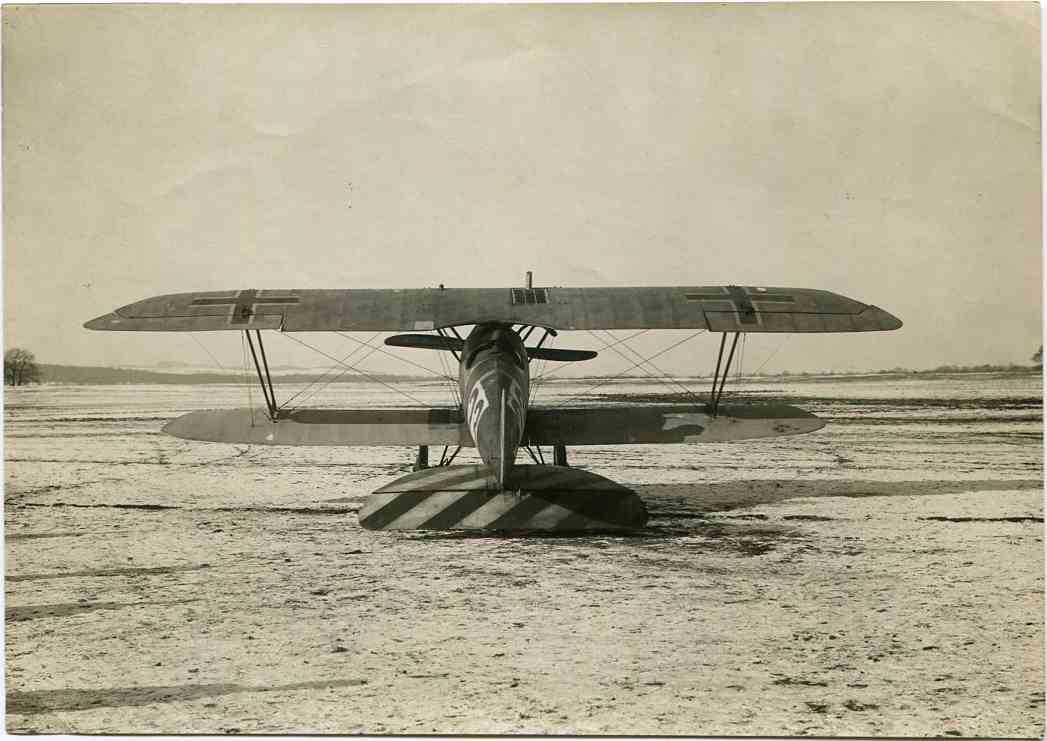
An example of a Pfalz D.IIIa.

In February 1917, he began a spell as a flight instructor at Breslau before transferring to a combat unit, fighter squadron Jagdstaffel 11 on 10 August. One week later, he shot down a British Bristol F.2b for his first aerial victory and his squadron's 200th. He would shoot down four more enemy airplanes during the rest of the year, with a victory over a Sopwith Camel on 15 December making him an ace.

He was acting commander of the Jasta from 19 January to 16 February 1918. On 26 March 1918, he took command of Jagdstaffel 4. On 28 March he was shot down and wounded by British fighters while flying a Pfalz D.III. He survived but saw no further action during the conflict. Hans-Georg von der Osten ended the war having been awarded both classes of the Iron Cross.

On 1 September 1935, Osten joined the Luftwaffe and served on the staff of General Kurt-Bertram von Döring. During World War II, he commanded all of Nazi Germany's Luftwaffe bases.

He was active in veterans' reunions right up until his death on 27 March 1987. He was the penultimate survivor from his old Jagdstaffel 11.
