= Gmina Płoty =

Gmina Płoty Płoty Commune
- Gmina
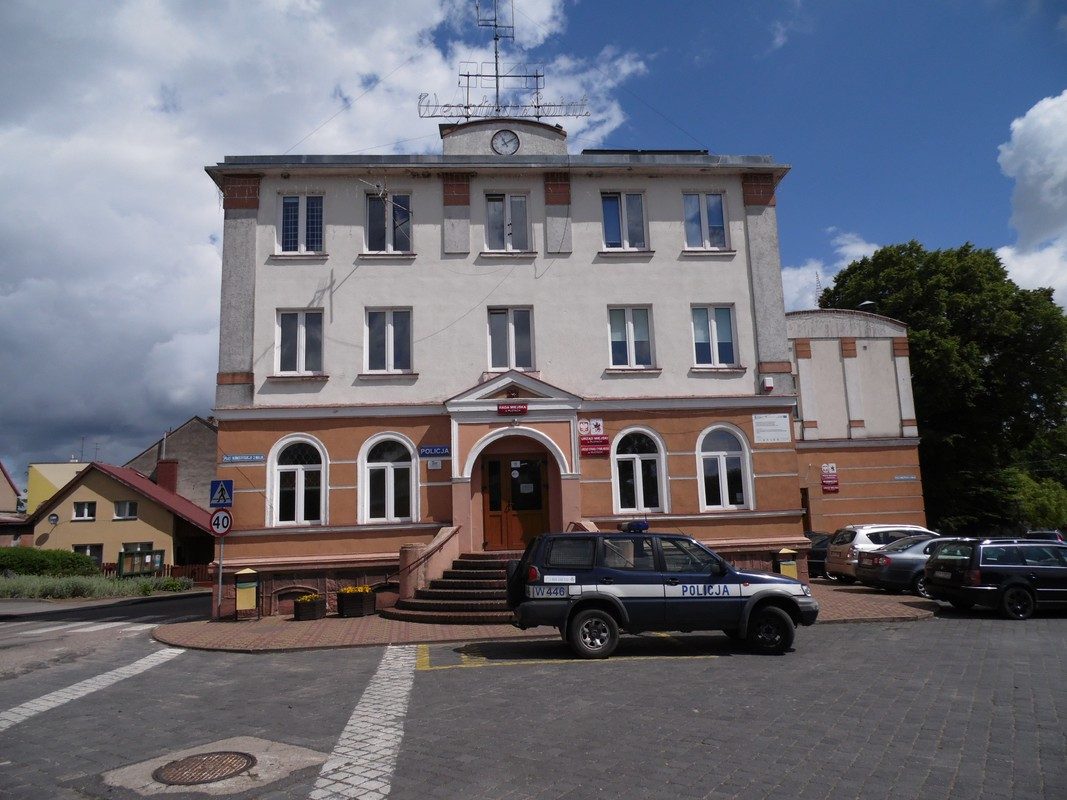

- Coat of arms
- Interactive map of Gmina Płoty
- Coordinates (Płoty): 53°48′29″N 15°15′53″E
- Country: Poland
- Voivodeship: West Pomeranian
- County: Gryfice
- Seat: Płoty

Area
  - Total: 238.79 km^{2} (92.20 sq mi)

Population (2006)
  - Total: 9,212
  - Density: 38.58/km^{2} (99.92/sq mi)
  - Urban: 4,142
  - Rural: 5,070
- Website: http://www.ploty.pl/

Gmina Płoty is an urban-rural gmina (administrative district) in Gryfice County, West Pomeranian Voivodeship, in north-western Poland. Its seat is the town of Płoty, which lies approximately 13 kilometres (8 mi) south of Gryfice and 63 km (39 mi) north-east of the regional capital Szczecin.

The gmina covers an area of 238.79 square kilometres (92.2 sq mi), and as of 2006 its total population is 9,212 (out of which the population of Płoty amounts to 4,142, and the population of the rural part of the gmina is 5,070).

== Villages ==
Apart from the town of Płoty, Gmina Płoty contains the villages and settlements of Bądkowo, Bucze, Charnowo, Czarne, Dąbie, Dalimierz, Darszyce, Dobiesław, Gardomino, Gościejewo, Gostyń Łobeski, Gostyński Bród, Jarzysław, Karczewie, Kłodno, Kobuz, Kocierz, Kopaniny, Krężel, Łęczna, Lisowo, Łowiska, Luciąża, Lusowo, Makowice, Makowiska, Mechowo, Modlimowo, Natolewice, Natolewiczki, Ostrobodno, Pniewko, Pniewo, Potuliniec, Słudwia, Sowno, Truskolas, Wicimice, Wicimiczki, Wilczyniec, Wyszobór, Wyszogóra and Wytok.

== Neighbouring gminas ==
Gmina Płoty is bordered by the gminas of Brojce, Golczewo, Gryfice, Nowogard, Resko and Rymań.
