= Konarzew =

Konarzew may refer to the following places:

- Konarzew, Greater Poland Voivodeship (west-central Poland)
- Konarzew, Łęczyca County in Łódź Voivodeship (central Poland)
- Konarzew, Zgierz County in Łódź Voivodeship (central Poland)

== See also ==
- Konarzewo (disambiguation)
