= Gmina Karnice =

Gmina Karnice Karnice Commune
- Gmina
- Coat of arms
- Interactive map of Gmina Karnice
- Coordinates (Karnice): 54°1′57″N 15°3′12″E
- Country: Poland
- Voivodeship: West Pomeranian
- County: Gryfice
- Seat: Karnice

Area
  - Total: 133.14 km^{2} (51.41 sq mi)

Population (2006)
  - Total: 4,172
  - Density: 31.34/km^{2} (81.16/sq mi)
- Website: https://www.karnice.pl/

Gmina Karnice is a rural gmina (administrative district) in Gryfice County, West Pomeranian Voivodeship, in north-western Poland. Its seat is the village of Karnice, which lies approximately 17 kilometres (11 mi) north-west of Gryfice and 76 km (47 mi) north-east of the regional capital Szczecin.

The gmina covers an area of 133.14 square kilometres (51.4 sq mi), and as of 2006 its total population is 4,172.

== Villages ==
Gmina Karnice contains the villages and settlements of Cerkwica, Ciećmierz, Czaplice, Czaplin Mały, Czaplin Wielki, Dreżewo, Drozdówko, Drozdowo, Gocławice, Gościmierz, Janowo, Karnice, Konarzewo, Kusin, Lędzin, Modlimowo, Mojszewo, Niczonów, Niedysz, Ninikowo, Niwy, Paprotno, Pogorzelica, Skalno, Skrobotowo, Trzeszyn, Węgorzyn, Witomierz and Zapole.

== Neighbouring gminas ==
Gmina Karnice is bordered by the gminas of Gryfice, Rewal, Świerzno and Trzebiatów.
