= Kobuz, Gryfice County =

Kobuz
- Village
- Location within Poland
- Coordinates: 53°55′39.64″N 15°22′51.24″E
- Country: Poland
- Voivodeship: West Pomeranian
- County: Gryfice
- Gmina: Płoty

Kobuz [ˈkɔbus] is a village in the administrative district of Gmina Płoty, within Gryfice County, West Pomeranian Voivodeship, in north-western Poland. It lies approximately 13 km (8 mi) south of Gryfice and 63 km (39 mi) northeast of the regional capital Szczecin .
