= Krężel, Gryfice County =

Krężel
- Village
- Location within Poland
- Coordinates: 53°49′13″N 15°14′04″E
- Country: Poland
- Voivodeship: West Pomeranian
- County: Gryfice
- Gmina: Płoty

Krężel (German: Henkenheide) is a village in Gmina Płoty, Gryfice County, West Pomeranian Voivodeship, Poland.

For the history of the region, see History of Pomerania.
