= Leszkowice, Lower Silesian Voivodeship =

Leszkowice
- Village
- Location within Poland
- Coordinates: 51°36′51″N 16°19′25″E
- Country: Poland
- Voivodeship: Lower Silesian
- County: Głogów
- Gmina: Pęcław

Leszkowice [lɛʂkɔˈvit͡sɛ] is a village in the administrative district of Gmina Pęcław, within Głogów County, Lower Silesian Voivodeship, in south-western Poland.
