= Trzęsów, Lower Silesian Voivodeship =

Trzęsów
- Village
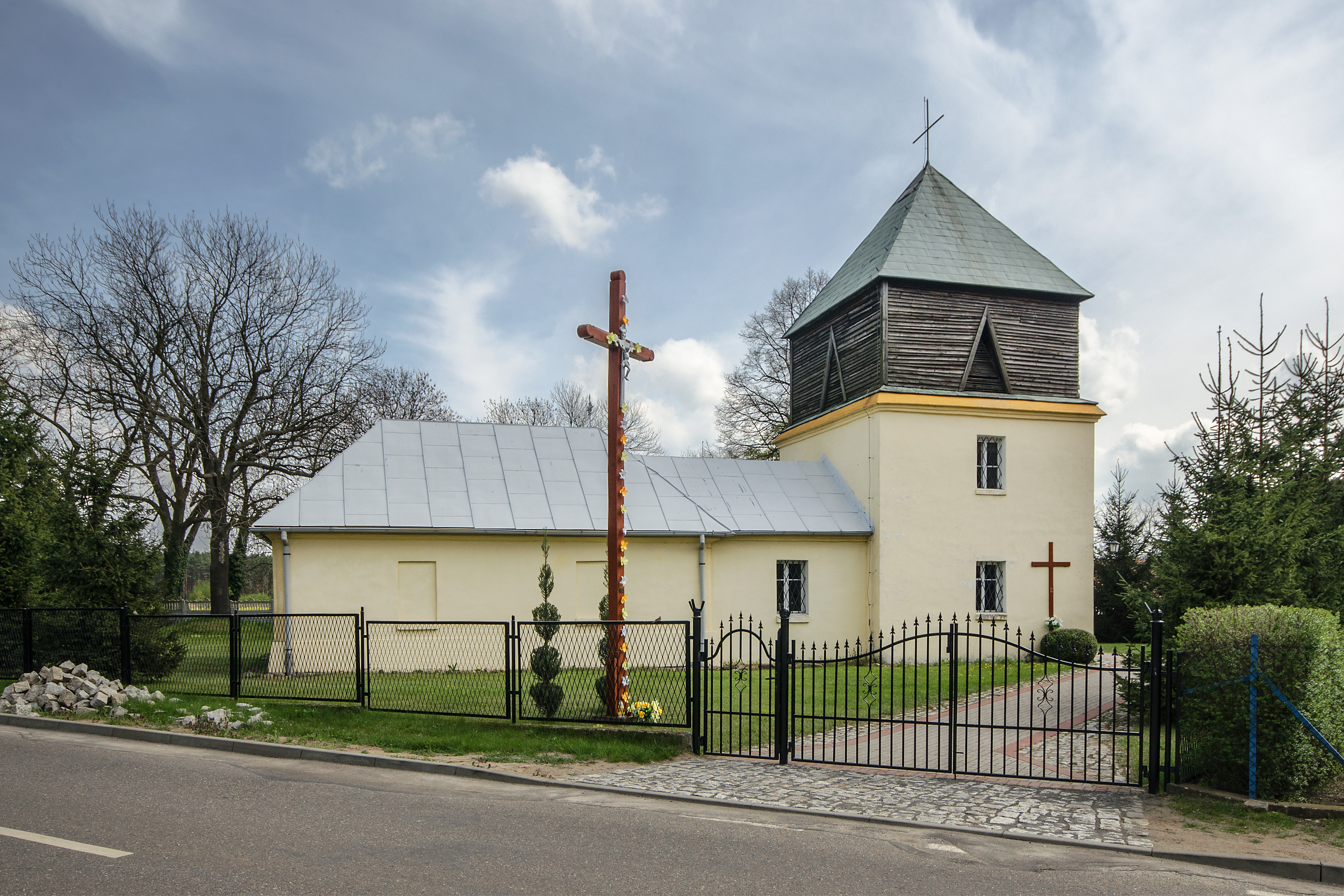

- Location within Poland
- Coordinates: 51°55′32.42″N 16°18′30.77″E
- Country: Poland
- Voivodeship: Lower Silesian
- County: Polkowice
- Gmina: Grębocice

Trzęsów [ˈtʂɛ̃suf] (German: Rostersdorf) is a village in the administrative district of Gmina Grębocice, within Polkowice County, Lower Silesian Voivodeship, in south-western Poland.
