= Gmina Brojce =

Gmina Brojce Brojce Commune
- Gmina
- Coat of arms
- Interactive map of Gmina Brojce
- Coordinates (Brojce): 53°57′24″N 15°22′2″E
- Country: Poland
- Voivodeship: West Pomeranian
- County: Gryfice
- Seat: Brojce

Area
  - Total: 118.06 km^{2} (45.58 sq mi)

Population (2006)
  - Total: 3,658
  - Density: 30.98/km^{2} (80.25/sq mi)
- Website: http://www.brojce.net.pl/

Gmina Brojce is a rural gmina (administrative district) in Gryfice County, West Pomeranian Voivodeship, in north-western Poland. Its seat is the village of Brojce, which lies approximately 12 kilometres (7 mi) north-east of Gryfice and 80 km (50 mi) north-east of the regional capital Szczecin.

The gmina covers an area of 118.06 square kilometres (45.6 sq mi), and as of 2006 its total population is 3,658.

== Villages ==
Gmina Brojce contains the villages and settlements of Bielikowo, Brojce, Cieszyce, Dargosław, Darżewo, Grąd, Kiełpino, Łatno, Mołstówko, Mołstowo, Pruszcz, Przybiernowo, Raciborów, Smokęcino, Stołąż, Strzykocin, Tąpadły, Uniestowo and Żukowo.

== Neighbouring gminas ==
Gmina Brojce is bordered by the gminas of Gryfice, Płoty, Rymań, Siemyśl and Trzebiatów.
