= Rzesznikowo =

- Village
- Location within Poland
- Coordinates: 53°55′40″N 15°29′29″E
- Country: Poland
- Voivodeship: West Pomeranian
- County: Kołobrzeg
- Gmina: Rymań
- Population: 220

Rzesznikowo [ʐɛʂniˈkɔvɔ] (German: Reselkow) is a village in the administrative district of Gmina Rymań, within Kołobrzeg County, West Pomeranian Voivodeship, in north-western Poland. It lies approximately 4 km (2 mi) south-west of Rymań, 27 km (17 mi) south of Kołobrzeg, and 83 km (52 mi) north-east of the regional capital Szczecin.

The village has a population of 220.

== See also ==
- History of Pomerania
