= Brojce =

- Village
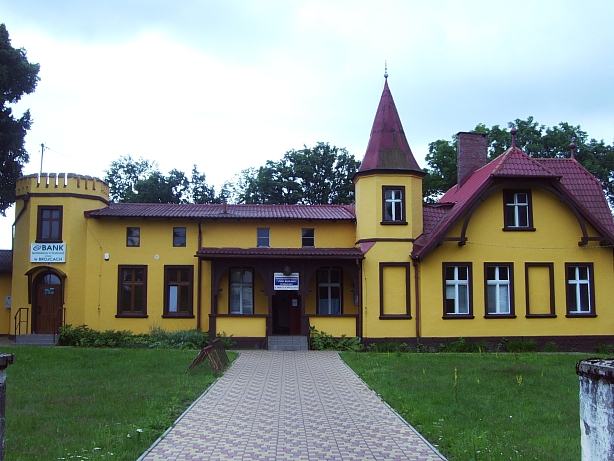
- Manor house

- Location within Poland
- Coordinates: 53°57′24″N 15°22′2″E
- Country: Poland
- Voivodeship: West Pomeranian
- County: Gryfice
- Gmina: Brojce

Population
  - Total: 1,279
- Vehicle registration: ZGY

Brojce [ˈbrɔi̯t͡sɛ] is a village in Gryfice County, West Pomeranian Voivodeship, in north-western Poland. It is the seat of the gmina (administrative district) called Gmina Brojce. It lies approximately 12 km (7 mi) north-east of Gryfice and 80 km (50 mi) north-east of the regional capital Szczecin.

The area became part of the emerging Polish state under its first historic ruler Mieszko I around 967. Following the fragmentation of Poland, it formed part of the Duchy of Pomerania. From the 18th century, it formed part of Prussia, and from 1871 to 1945 it was also part of Germany. After Germany's defeat in World War II, it became again part of Poland.
