= Karnice, Gryfice County =

Karnice
- Village
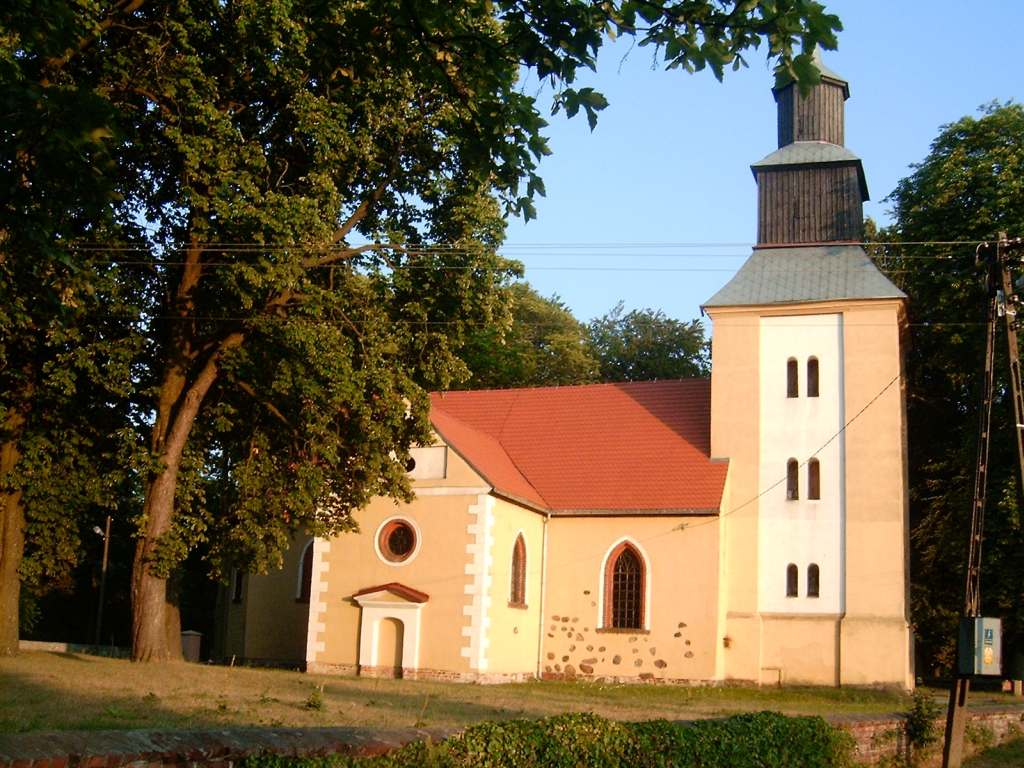

- Location within Poland
- Coordinates: 54°1′57″N 15°3′12″E
- Country: Poland
- Voivodeship: West Pomeranian
- County: Gryfice
- Gmina: Karnice
- Population: 690

Karnice [karˈnit͡sɛ] (German: Karnitz) is a village in Gryfice County, West Pomeranian Voivodeship, in north-western Poland. It is the seat of the gmina (administrative district) called Gmina Karnice. It lies approximately 17 km (11 mi) north-west of Gryfice and 76 km (47 mi) north-east of the regional capital Szczecin.

For the history of the region, see History of Pomerania.

The village has a population of 690.
