= Płoty =

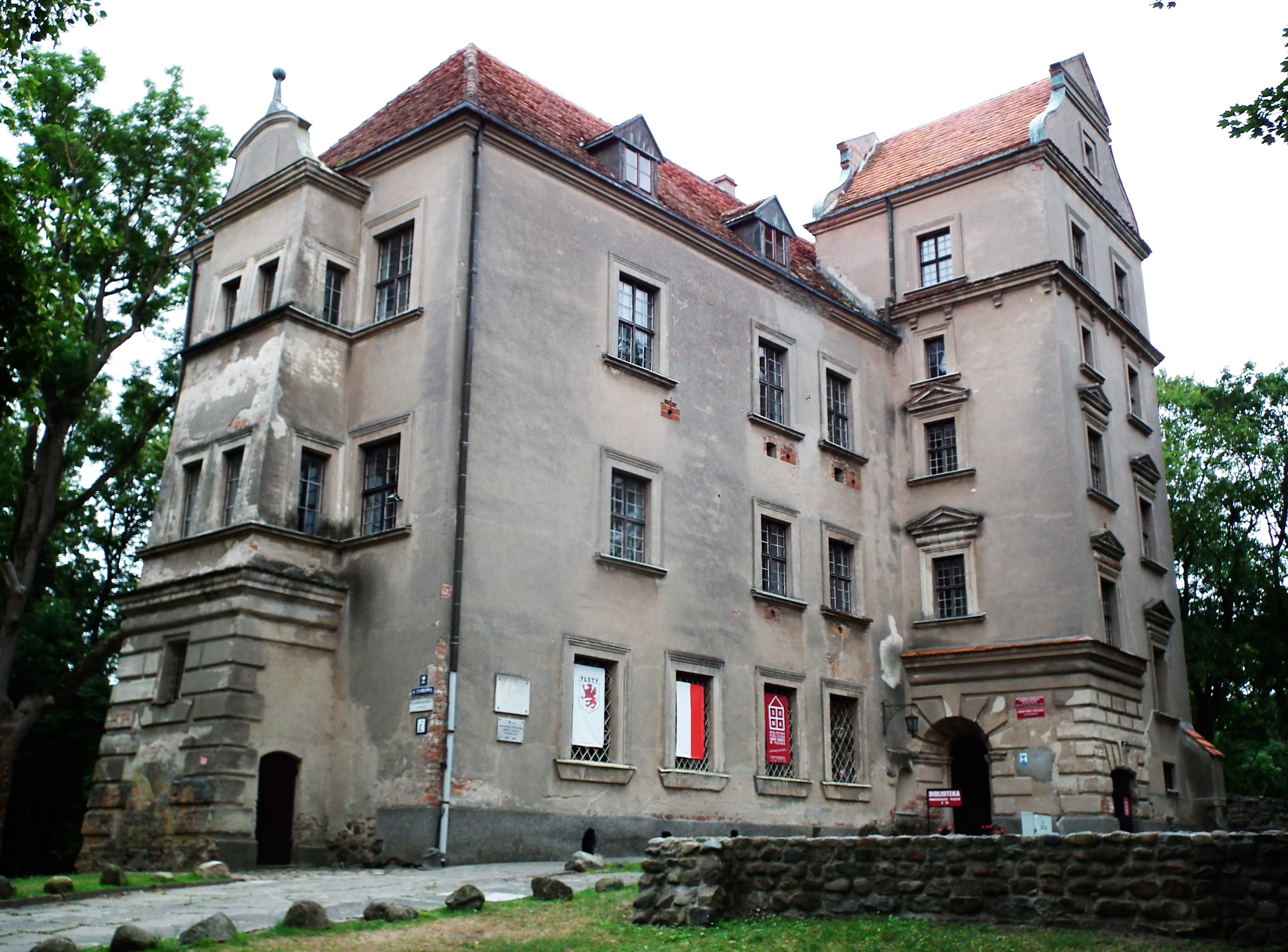
- Renaissance Old Castle in Płoty

- Coat of arms
- Interactive map of Płoty
- Location within Poland
- Coordinates: 53°48′29″N 15°15′53″E
- Country: Poland
- Voivodeship: West Pomeranian
- County: Gryfice
- Gmina: Płoty
- Established: 8th century
- Town rights: 1277

Government
  - Mayor: Marian Maliński

Area
  - Total: 4.12 km^{2} (1.59 sq mi)

Population (2010)
  - Total: 4,035
  - Density: 979/km^{2} (2,540/sq mi)
- Time zone: UTC+1 (CET)
  - Summer (DST): UTC+2 (CEST)
- Postal code: 72-310
- Car plates: ZGY
- Website: http://www.ploty.pl/

Płoty [ˈpwɔtɨ] (Kashubian: Płota; German: Plathe an der Rega) is a town in Gryfice County, West Pomeranian Voivodeship, in north-western Poland, with 4,035 inhabitants (2010).

== Sights ==
Main heritage sights of Płoty are:

- the Renaissance Old Castle, location of the Municipal Library
- the New Castle and adjacent Municipal Park
- the Church of the Transfiguration

== History ==
It was located at the intersection of the Gdańsk-Szczecin and Trzebiatów-Łobez routes. In the late 19th century, the population mostly made a living from farming and cattle breeding, with cattle sold to Berlin and Hamburg.

During World War II, the German administration operated a forced labour subcamp of the Stalag II-D prisoner-of-war camp in the town.

== Demographics ==
Historical population

Year	Pop.	±%
1871	2,091	—
1880	2,226	+6.5%
1890	2,262	+1.6%
1900	2,276	+0.6%
1910	2,849	+25.2%

Year	Pop.	±%
1925	3,272	+14.8%
1939	3,646	+11.4%
1950	1,817	−50.2%
1960	3,088	+70.0%
2010	4,035	+30.7%

== Notable people ==
- Fritz Köpke (1902–1991), German athlete, competed in the men's high jump at the 1928 Summer Olympics

== International relations ==
Płoty is twinned with:

- Niebüll, Germany
