= Gryfice County =

Gryfice County Powiat gryficki
- County
- Flag Coat of arms

- Location within the voivodeship

- Division into gminas
- Coordinates (Gryfice): 53°54′53″N 15°11′55″E
- Country: Poland
- Voivodeship: West Pomeranian
- Seat: Gryfice
- Gminas: Total 6: Gmina Brojce; Gmina Gryfice; Gmina Karnice; Gmina Płoty; Gmina Rewal; Gmina Trzebiatów

Area
  - Total: 1,018.19 km^{2} (393.13 sq mi)

Population (2006)
  - Total: 60,773
  - Density: 59.687/km^{2} (154.59/sq mi)
  - Urban: 30,957
  - Rural: 29,816
- Car plates: ZGY
- Website: www.gryfice.pl

Gryfice County (Polish: powiat gryficki) is a unit of territorial administration and local government (powiat) in West Pomeranian Voivodeship, north-western Poland, on the Baltic coast. It came into being on January 1, 1999, as a result of the Polish local government reforms passed in 1998. Its administrative seat and largest town is Gryfice, which lies 69 kilometres (43 mi) north-east of the regional capital Szczecin. The county also contains the towns of Trzebiatów, lying 17 km (11 mi) north of Gryfice, and Płoty, 13 km (8 mi) south of Gryfice.

The county covers an area of 1,018.19 square kilometres (393.1 sq mi). As of 2006 its total population is 60,773, out of which the population of Gryfice is 16,702, that of Trzebiatów is 10,113, that of Płoty is 4,142, and the rural population is 29,816.

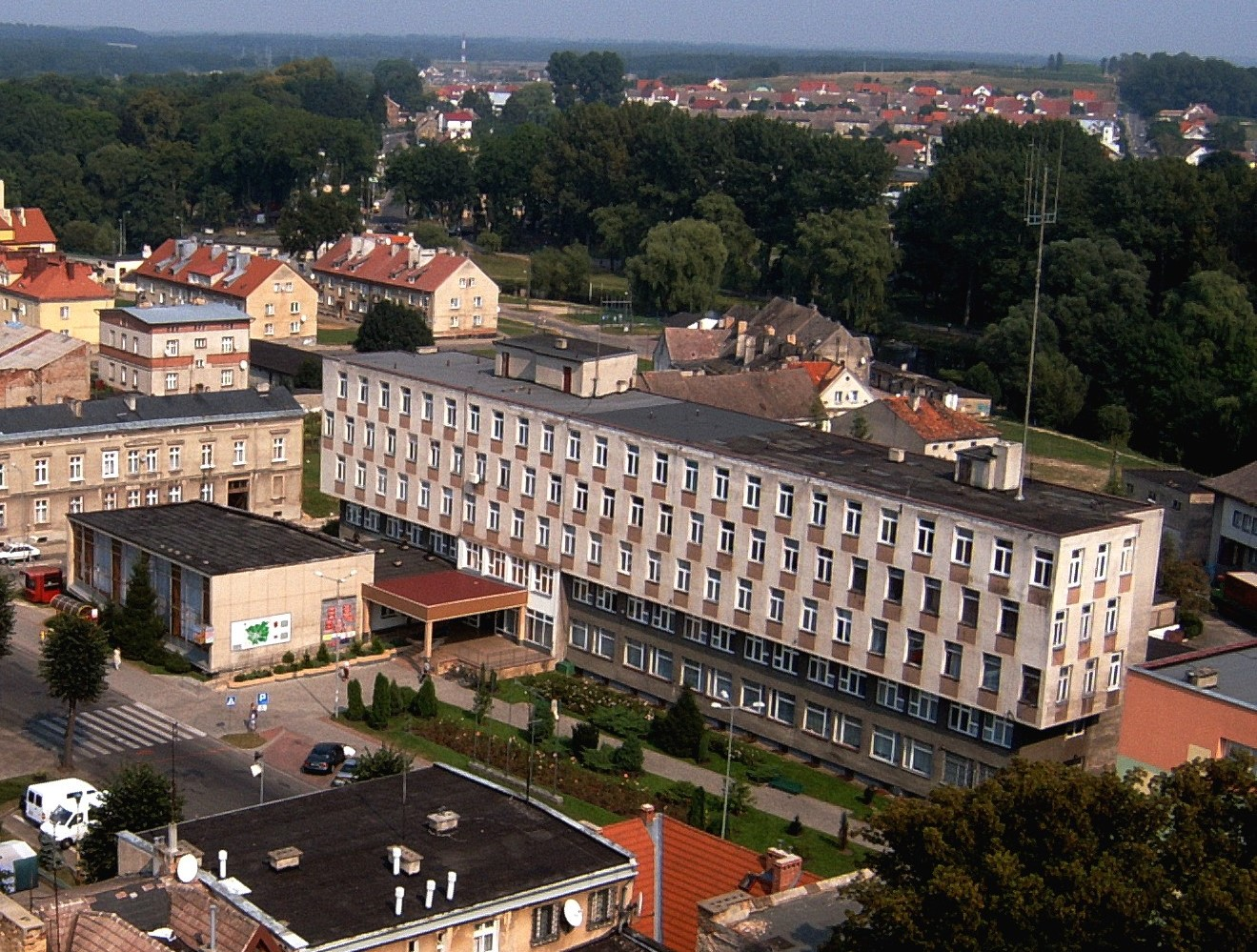
The building of the municipality and district

== Neighbouring counties ==
Gryfice County is bordered by Kołobrzeg County to the east, Łobez County to the south-east, Goleniów County to the south-west and Kamień County to the west. It also borders the Baltic Sea to the north.

== Administrative divisions ==
The county is subdivided into six gminas (three urban-rural and three rural). These are listed in the following table, in descending order of population.

Gmina	Type	Area (km^{2})	Population (2006)	Seat
Gmina Gryfice	urban-rural	261.6	23,487	Gryfice
Gmina Trzebiatów	urban-rural	225.4	16,803	Trzebiatów
Gmina Płoty	urban-rural	238.8	9,212	Płoty
Gmina Karnice	rural	133.1	4,172	Karnice
Gmina Brojce	rural	118.1	3,658	Brojce
Gmina Rewal	rural	41.1	3,441	Rewal
