= Voivodeship road 110 =

Road in Poland

Voivodeship Road 110
- Droga wojewódzka nr 110

Route information
- Maintained by Zachodnio Pomorski Zarząd Dróg Wojewódzkich
- Length: 23 km (14 mi)

Location
- Country: Poland
- Regions: West Pomeranian Voivodeship
- Major cities: Gryfice

Highway system
- National roads in Poland; Voivodeship roads
← DW 109	→ DW 111

Voivodeship road 110 (Polish: Droga wojewódzka nr 110, abbreviated DW 110) is a route in the Polish voivodeship roads network. The route links the Voivodeship Road 102 in Lędzin, Voivodeship Road 103 in Cerkwica with Voivodeship Road 109 and Voivodeship Road 105 in Gryfice. The route runs through Gryfice County with length 23 km.

== Important settlements along the route ==
- Lędzin
- Karnice
- Cerkwica
- Przybiernówko
- Gryfice

== Route plan ==
km	Icon	Name	Crossed roads
x		Międzyzdroje	—
x		Kołobrzeg	—
0		Lędzin	
3		Skrobotowo	—
5		Karnice	—
11		Cerkwica	
18		Przybiernówko	—
23		Level crossing for the Railway Line 402	—
23		Gryfice	
x		Świerzno	—
x		Rzesznikowo	—
x		Mrzeżyno	—
x		Płoty	—
