= Voivodeship road 109 =

Road in Poland

Voivodeship Road 109
- Droga wojewódzka nr 109

Route information
- Maintained by Zachodnio Pomorski Zarząd Dróg Wojewódzkich
- Length: 38.895 km (24.168 mi)

Location
- Country: Poland
- Regions: West Pomeranian Voivodeship

Highway system
- National roads in Poland; Voivodeship roads
← DW 108	→ DW 110

Voivodeship Road 109 (Polish: Droga wojewódzka nr 109, abbreviated DW 109) is a route in the Polish voivodeship roads network. The route links Mrzeżyno with the National Road 6 in Płoty.

== Important settlements along the route ==
- Mrzeżyno
- Trzebiatów
- Gryfice
- Smolęcin
- Płoty
