= Raduń, Gryfice County =

Raduń
- Settlement
- Location within Poland
- Coordinates: 53°57′0″N 15°15′58″E
- Country: Poland
- Voivodeship: West Pomeranian
- County: Gryfice
- Gmina: Gryfice
- Population: 116

Raduń [ˈraduɲ] (German: Radduhn) is a settlement in the administrative district of Gmina Gryfice, within Gryfice County, West Pomeranian Voivodeship, in north-western Poland. It lies approximately 6 km (4 mi) north-east of Gryfice and 75 km (47 mi) north-east of the regional capital Szczecin.

Before 1637 the area was part of Duchy of Pomerania. For the history of the region, see History of Pomerania and History of Gryfice.

The settlement has a population of 116.
