= Jasiel, West Pomeranian Voivodeship =

Jasiel
- Village
- Location within Poland
- Coordinates: 53°50′0″N 15°5′14″E
- Country: Poland
- Voivodeship: West Pomeranian
- County: Gryfice
- Gmina: Gryfice
- Population: 101

Jasiel [ˈjaɕɛl] (German: Jatzel) is a village in the administrative district of Gmina Gryfice, within Gryfice County, West Pomeranian Voivodeship, in north-western Poland. It lies approximately 12 km (7 mi) south-west of Gryfice and 57 km (35 mi) north-east of the regional capital Szczecin.

The village has a population of 101.

== See also ==
- History of Pomerania
