= Dobrzyń, West Pomeranian Voivodeship =

Dobrzyń
- Village
- Location within Poland
- Coordinates: 53°55′49″N 15°3′37″E
- Country: Poland
- Voivodeship: West Pomeranian
- County: Gryfice
- Gmina: Gryfice

Dobrzyń [ˈdɔbʐɨɲ] (German: Annashof) is a village in the administrative district of Gmina Gryfice, within Gryfice County, West Pomeranian Voivodeship, in north-western Poland. It lies approximately 10 km (6 mi) west of Gryfice and 66 km (41 mi) north-east of the regional capital Szczecin.
