= Krakowice =

- Village
- Location within Poland
- Coordinates: 53°54′3″N 15°4′52″E
- Country: Poland
- Voivodeship: West Pomeranian
- County: Gryfice
- Gmina: Gryfice

Krakowice [krakɔˈvit͡sɛ] is a village in the administrative district of Gmina Gryfice, within Gryfice County, West Pomeranian Voivodeship, in north-western Poland. It lies approximately 8 kilometres (5 mi) west of Gryfice and 63 km (39 mi) north-east of the regional capital Szczecin.

For the history of the region, see History of Pomerania.
