= Prusinowo, Gryfice County =

Prusinowo
- Settlement
- Location within Poland
- Coordinates: 53°57′8″N 15°11′44″E
- Country: Poland
- Voivodeship: West Pomeranian
- County: Gryfice
- Gmina: Gryfice
- Population: 565

Prusinowo [pruɕiˈnɔvɔ] (German: Rützow) is a settlement in the administrative district of Gmina Gryfice, within Gryfice County, West Pomeranian Voivodeship, in north-western Poland. It lies approximately 5 km (3 mi) north of Gryfice and 72 km (45 mi) north-east of the regional capital Szczecin.

Before 1637 the area was part of the Duchy of Pomerania. In 1815–1945 it was part of the Province of Pomerania. For the history of the region, see History of Pomerania.

The settlement has a population of 565.
