= Zacisze, Gryfice County =

Zacisze
- Village
- Location within Poland
- Coordinates: 53°59′41″N 15°12′50″E
- Country: Poland
- Voivodeship: West Pomeranian
- County: Gryfice
- Gmina: Gryfice
- Population: 60

Zacisze [zaˈt͡ɕiʂɛ] is a village in the administrative district of Gmina Gryfice, within Gryfice County, West Pomeranian Voivodeship, in north-western Poland. It lies approximately 9 kilometres (6 mi) north of Gryfice and 77 km (48 mi) north-east of the regional capital Szczecin.

For the history of the region, see History of Pomerania and History of Gryfice.

The village has a population of 60.
