= Barkowo, West Pomeranian Voivodeship =

Barkowo
- Settlement
- Location within Poland
- Coordinates: 53°50′40″N 15°14′30″E
- Country: Poland
- Voivodeship: West Pomeranian
- County: Gryfice
- Gmina: Gryfice

Barkowo [barˈkɔvɔ] (German: Barckow) is a settlement in the administrative district of Gmina Gryfice, within Gryfice County, West Pomeranian Voivodeship, in north-western Poland. It lies approximately 9 km (6 mi) south of Gryfice and 65 km (40 mi) north-east of the regional capital Szczecin.

== History ==
Following the decisions at Potsdam Conference, the village's German population was forced out of their homes in March 1946.
