= Zielin =

Zielin may refer to the following places:

- Zielin, Pomeranian Voivodeship (north Poland)
- Zielin, Gryfice County in West Pomeranian Voivodeship (north-west Poland)
- Zielin, Gryfino County in West Pomeranian Voivodeship (north-west Poland)
