= Dziadowo =

- Village
- Location within Poland
- Coordinates: 53°57′21″N 15°14′29″E
- Country: Poland
- Voivodeship: West Pomeranian
- County: Gryfice
- Gmina: Gryfice
- Population: 104

Dziadowo pronounced [d͡ʑaˈdɔvɔ] (German: Dadow) is a village in the administrative district of Gmina Gryfice, within Gryfice County, West Pomeranian Voivodeship, in north-western Poland. It lies approximately 6 km (4 mi) north-east of Gryfice and 74 km (46 mi) north-east of the regional capital Szczecin.

The village has a population of 104.

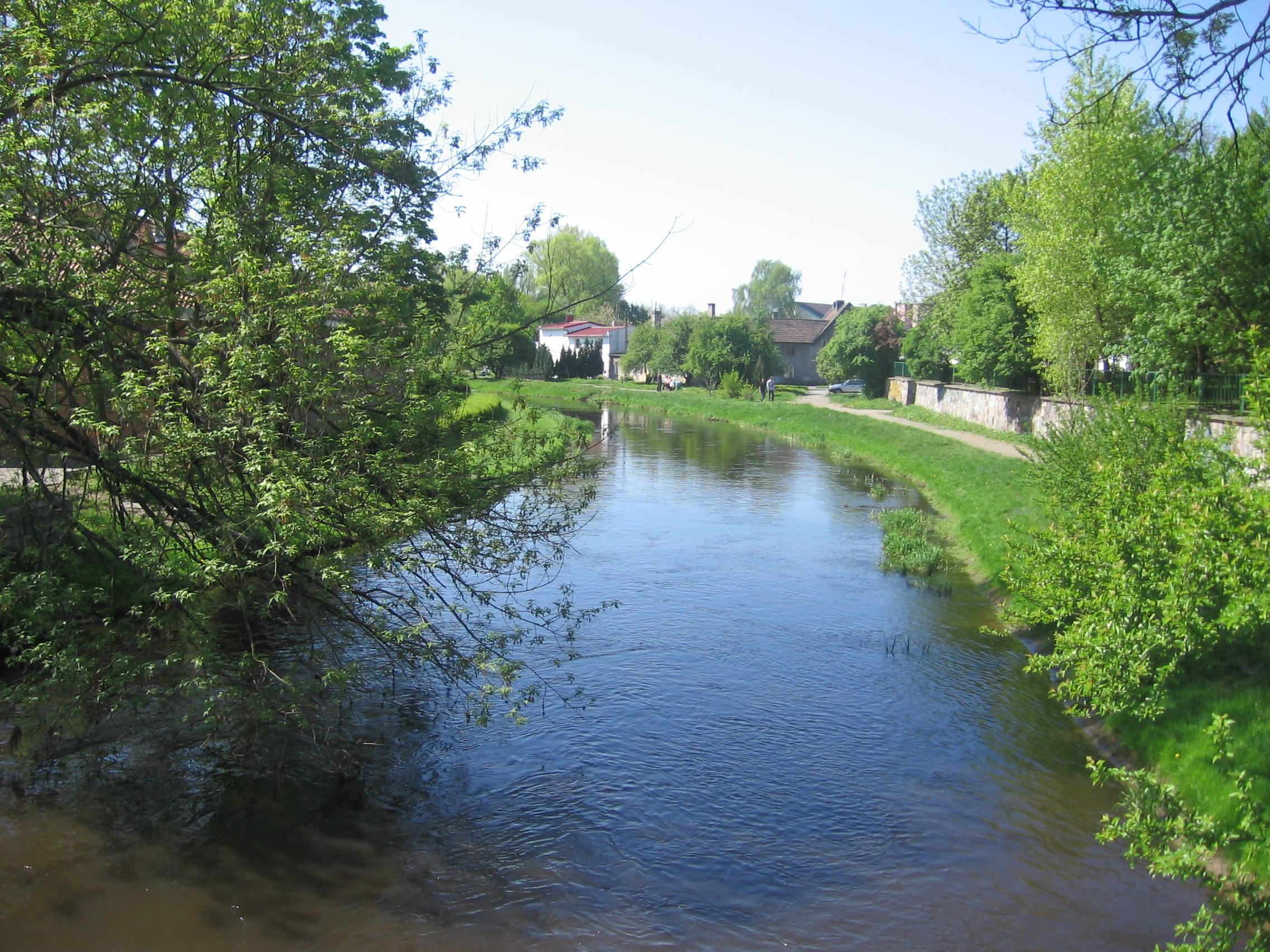
Rega River near Dziadowo
