= Mierzyn, Gryfice County =

Mierzyn
- Village
- Location within Poland
- Coordinates: 53°56′57″N 15°12′13″E
- Country: Poland
- Voivodeship: West Pomeranian
- County: Gryfice
- Gmina: Gryfice
- Population: 28

Mierzyn [ˈmjɛʐɨn] is a village in the administrative district of Gmina Gryfice, within Gryfice County, West Pomeranian Voivodeship, in north-western Poland. It lies approximately 4 kilometres (2 mi) north of Gryfice and 72 km (45 mi) north-east of the regional capital Szczecin.

The village has a population of 28.

== See also ==
- History of Pomerania.
