= Rzęskowo =

- Village
- Location within Poland
- Coordinates: 53°55′34″N 15°9′26″E
- Country: Poland
- Voivodeship: West Pomeranian
- County: Gryfice
- Gmina: Gryfice
- Population: 238

Rzęskowo [ʐɛ̃sˈkɔvɔ] (German: Rensekow) is a village in the administrative district of Gmina Gryfice, within Gryfice County, West Pomeranian Voivodeship, in north-western Poland. It lies approximately 3 km (2 mi) north-west of Gryfice and 69 km (43 mi) north-east of the regional capital Szczecin.

The village has a population of 238.

Before 1637 the area was part of Duchy of Pomerania. For the history of the region, see History of Pomerania.
