= Stawno, Gryfice County =

Stawno
- Village
- Location within Poland
- Coordinates: 53°54′52″N 15°14′32″E
- Country: Poland
- Voivodeship: West Pomeranian
- County: Gryfice
- Gmina: Gryfice

Stawno [ˈstavnɔ] (German: Gründemannshof) is a village in the administrative district of Gmina Gryfice, within Gryfice County, West Pomeranian Voivodeship, in north-western Poland. It lies approximately 3 km (2 mi) east of Gryfice and 71 km (44 mi) north-east of the regional capital Szczecin.

Before 1637 the area was part of Duchy of Pomerania. For the history of the region, see History of Pomerania.
