= Świeszewo, West Pomeranian Voivodeship =

Świeszewo
- Village
- Location within Poland
- Coordinates: 53°52′8″N 15°4′36″E
- Country: Poland
- Voivodeship: West Pomeranian
- County: Gryfice
- Gmina: Gryfice

Świeszewo (Polish: [ɕfjɛˈʂɛvɔ]; German: Schwessow) is a village in the administrative district of Gmina Gryfice, within Gryfice County, West Pomeranian Voivodeship, in north-western Poland. It lies approximately 10 km (6 mi) south-west of Gryfice and 60 km (37 mi) north-east of the regional capital Szczecin.

== History ==
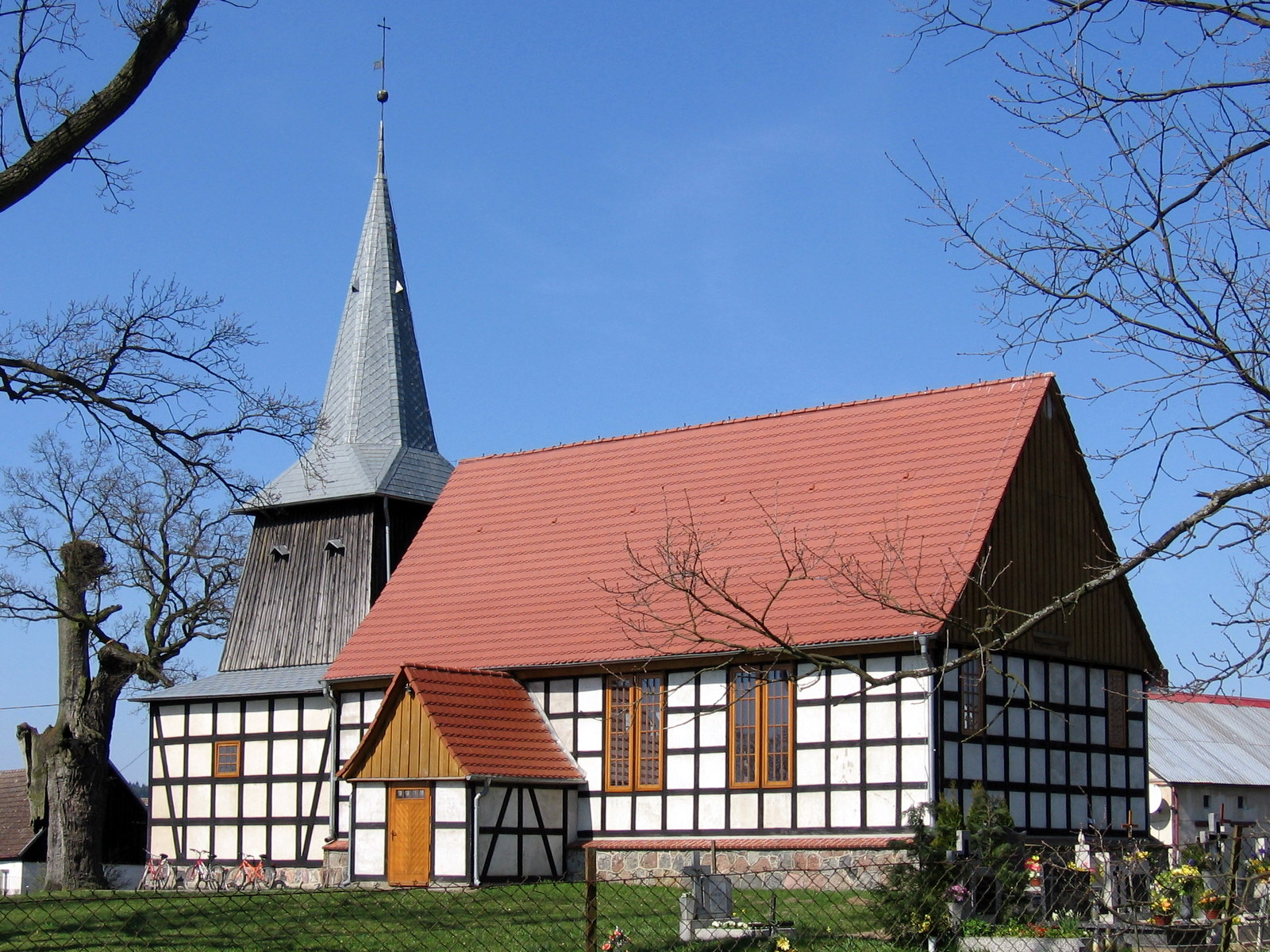
Roman Catholic Church of Black Madonna of Częstochowa in Świeszewo

Before 1637 the area was part of Duchy of Pomerania. For the history of the region, see History of Pomerania.
