= Skowrony, West Pomeranian Voivodeship =

Skowrony
- Village
- Location within Poland
- Coordinates: 53°54′41″N 15°17′13″E
- Country: Poland
- Voivodeship: West Pomeranian
- County: Gryfice
- Gmina: Gryfice

Skowrony [skɔˈvrɔnɨ] is a village in the administrative district of Gmina Gryfice, within Gryfice County, West Pomeranian Voivodeship, in north-western Poland. It lies approximately 6 kilometres (4 mi) east of Gryfice and 72 km (45 mi) north-east of the regional capital Szczecin.

For the history of the region, see History of Pomerania.
