= Grądy, West Pomeranian Voivodeship =

Grądy
- Village
- Location within Poland
- Coordinates: 53°57′47″N 15°6′41″E
- Country: Poland
- Voivodeship: West Pomeranian
- County: Gryfice
- Gmina: Gryfice
- Population: 62

Grądy [ˈɡrɔndɨ] (German: Grandshagen) is a village in the administrative district of Gmina Gryfice, within Gryfice County, West Pomeranian Voivodeship, in north-western Poland. It lies approximately 8 km (5 mi) north-west of Gryfice and 70 km (43 mi) north-east of the regional capital Szczecin.

For the history of the region, see History of Pomerania.

The village has a population of 62.
