= Wilczkowo, West Pomeranian Voivodeship =

Wilczkowo
- Village
- Location within Poland
- Coordinates: 53°55′44″N 15°6′18″E
- Country: Poland
- Voivodeship: West Pomeranian
- County: Gryfice
- Gmina: Gryfice
- Population: 65

Wilczkowo [vilt͡ʂˈkɔvɔ] (German: Völschenhagen) is a village in the administrative district of Gmina Gryfice, within Gryfice County, West Pomeranian Voivodeship, in north-western Poland. It lies approximately 7 km (4 mi) west of Gryfice and 67 km (42 mi) north-east of the regional capital Szczecin.

The village has a population of 65.
