= Lubków, West Pomeranian Voivodeship =

Lubków
- Village
- Location within Poland
- Coordinates: 53°54′45″N 15°6′56″E
- Country: Poland
- Voivodeship: West Pomeranian
- County: Gryfice
- Gmina: Gryfice

Lubków [ˈlupkuf] is a village in the administrative district of Gmina Gryfice, within Gryfice County, West Pomeranian Voivodeship, found in north-western Poland. It lies approximately 6 kilometres (4 mi) west of Gryfice and 66 km (41 mi) north-east of the region’s capital Szczecin.

For the history of the region, see History of Pomerania.
