= Baszewice =

- Village
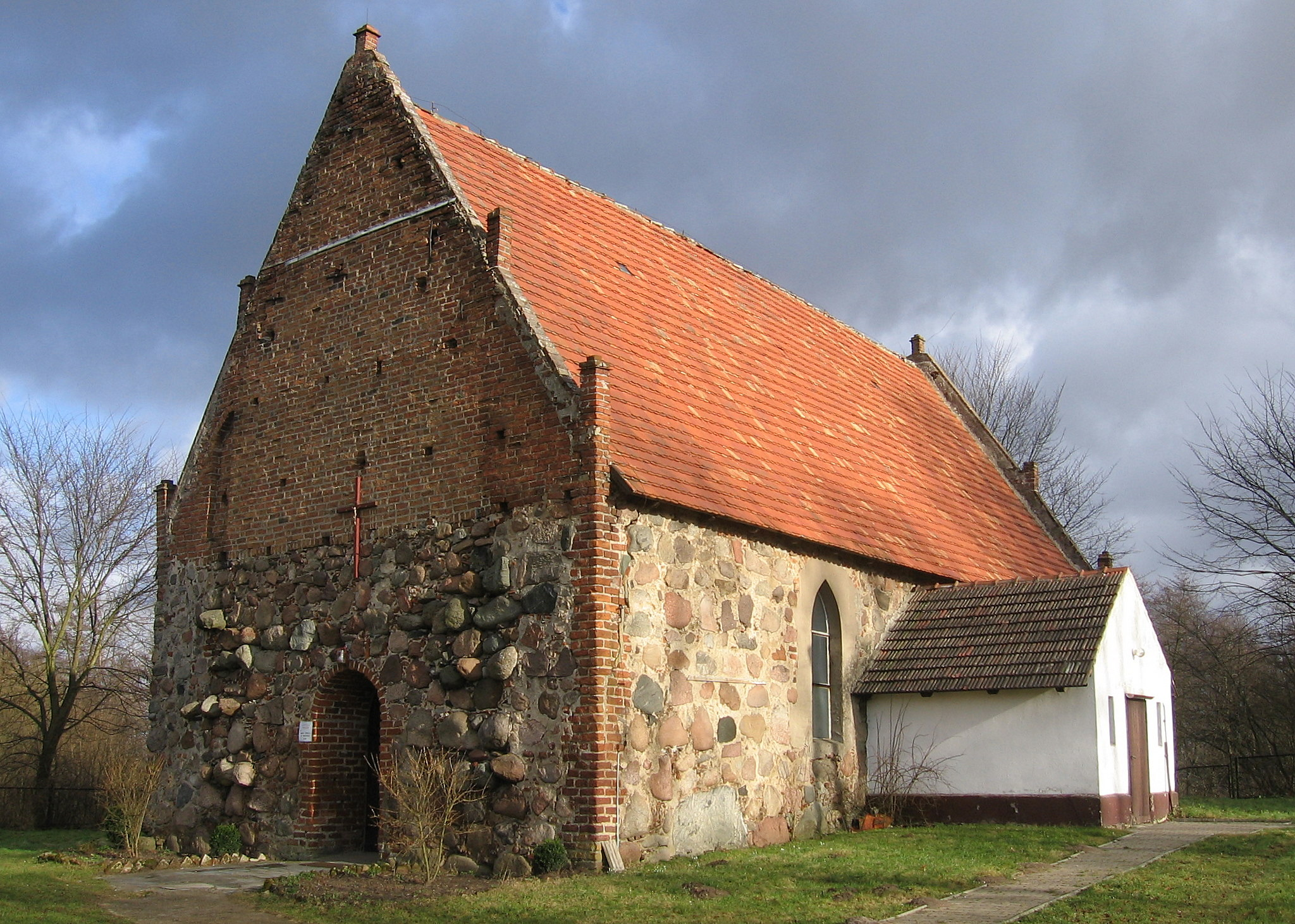
- Church of St. Mary of the Rosary

- Location within Poland
- Coordinates: 53°51′46″N 15°11′53″E
- Country: Poland
- Voivodeship: West Pomeranian
- County: Gryfice
- Gmina: Gryfice

Population
  - Total: 284

Baszewice [baʂɛˈvit͡sɛ], (German: Batzwitz) is a village in the administrative district of Gmina Gryfice, within Gryfice County, West Pomeranian Voivodeship, in north-western Poland. It lies approximately 6 km (4 mi) south of Gryfice and 64 km (40 mi) north-east of the regional capital Szczecin.

The village has a population of 284.
