= Borzyszewo =

- Village
- Location within Poland
- Coordinates: 53°54′6″N 15°9′55″E
- Country: Poland
- Voivodeship: West Pomeranian
- County: Gryfice
- Gmina: Gryfice
- Population: 90

Borzyszewo [bɔʐɨˈʂɛvɔ] is a village in the administrative district of Gmina Gryfice, within Gryfice County, West Pomeranian Voivodeship, in north-western Poland. It lies approximately 3 kilometres (2 mi) south-west of Gryfice and 67 km (42 mi) north-east of the regional capital Szczecin.

For the history of the region, see History of Pomerania.

The village has a population of 90.
