= Sikory, Gryfice County =

Sikory
- Village
- Location within Poland
- Coordinates: 53°57′16″N 15°12′31″E
- Country: Poland
- Voivodeship: West Pomeranian
- County: Gryfice
- Gmina: Gryfice
- Population: 57

Sikory [ɕiˈkɔrɨ] (German: Zicker) is a village in the administrative district of Gmina Gryfice, within Gryfice County, West Pomeranian Voivodeship, in north-western Poland. It lies approximately 5 km (3 mi) north of Gryfice and 73 km (45 mi) north-east of the regional capital Szczecin.

The village has a population of 57.

Before 1637 the area was part of Duchy of Pomerania. For the history of the region, see History of Pomerania.
