= Grochów, West Pomeranian Voivodeship =

Grochów
- Settlement
- Location within Poland
- Coordinates: 53°50′32″N 15°9′12″E
- Country: Poland
- Voivodeship: West Pomeranian
- County: Gryfice
- Gmina: Gryfice

Grochów [ˈɡrɔxuf] is a settlement in the administrative district of Gmina Gryfice, within Gryfice County, West Pomeranian Voivodeship, in northwestern Poland. It lies approximately 9 kilometres (6 mi) south of Gryfice and 61 km (38 mi) northeast of the regional capital Szczecin.

For the history of the region, see History of Pomerania.
