= Kukań =

- Village
- Location within Poland
- Coordinates: 53°53′N 15°5′E
- Country: Poland
- Voivodeship: West Pomeranian
- County: Gryfice
- Gmina: Gryfice

Kukań [ˈkukaɲ] (German: Kukahn) is a village in the administrative district of Gmina Gryfice, within Gryfice County, West Pomeranian Voivodeship, in north-western Poland. It lies approximately 9 km (6 mi) south-west of Gryfice and 62 km (39 mi) north-east of the regional capital Szczecin.
