= Popiele =

- Village
- Location within Poland
- Coordinates: 53°54′15″N 15°8′13″E
- Country: Poland
- Voivodeship: West Pomeranian
- County: Gryfice
- Gmina: Gryfice

Popiele [pɔˈpjɛlɛ] is a village in the administrative district of Gmina Gryfice, within Gryfice County, West Pomeranian Voivodeship, in north-western Poland. It lies approximately 5 kilometres (3 mi) west of Gryfice and 66 km (41 mi) north-east of the regional capital Szczecin.

For the history of the region, see History of Pomerania.
