= Brodniki =

- Settlement
- Location within Poland
- Coordinates: 53°53′4″N 15°12′20″E
- Country: Poland
- Voivodeship: West Pomeranian
- County: Gryfice
- Gmina: Gryfice
- Time zone: UTC+1 (CET)
  - Summer (DST): UTC+2 (CEST)
- Vehicle registration: ZGY

Brodniki [brɔdˈniki] is a settlement in the administrative district of Gmina Gryfice, within Gryfice County, West Pomeranian Voivodeship, in north-western Poland. It lies approximately 4 kilometres (2 mi) south of Gryfice and 67 km (42 mi) north-east of the regional capital Szczecin.

== History ==
The territory became part of the emerging Polish state under its first ruler Mieszko I around 967. Following the fragmentation of Poland, it was part of the Duchy of Pomerania.

During World War II, the German administration operated a forced labour subcamp of the prison in Goleniów in the village.
