= Skalin =

Skalin may refer to:

- Skalin, Gryfice County, a village in Poland
- Skalin, Stargard County, a village in Poland
- Skalina Point in Antarctica
- Igor Skalin (born 1970), Russian Olympic sailor
- Johnny Skalin (born 1978), Swedish politician
