= Jabłonowo, Gryfice County =

Jabłonowo
- Settlement
- Location within Poland
- Coordinates: 53°53′22″N 15°9′52″E
- Country: Poland
- Voivodeship: West Pomeranian
- County: Gryfice
- Gmina: Gryfice

Jabłonowo [jabwɔˈnɔvɔ] is a settlement in the administrative district of Gmina Gryfice, within Gryfice County, West Pomeranian Voivodeship, in north-western Poland. It lies approximately 4 kilometres (2 mi) south-west of Gryfice and 65 km (40 mi) north-east of the regional capital Szczecin.

For the history of the region, see History of Pomerania and History of Gryfice.
