= Niedźwiedziska =

- Village
- Location within Poland
- Coordinates: 53°56′54″N 15°4′40″E
- Country: Poland
- Voivodeship: West Pomeranian
- County: Gryfice
- Gmina: Gryfice

Niedźwiedziska [ɲɛd͡ʑvjɛˈd͡ʑiska] is a village in the administrative district of Gmina Gryfice, within Gryfice County, West Pomeranian Voivodeship, in north-western Poland. It lies approximately 9 km (6 mi) north-west of Gryfice and 68 km (42 mi) north-east of the regional capital Szczecin.
