= Podłęcze, Gryfice County =

Podłęcze
- Village
- Location within Poland
- Coordinates: 53°50′25″N 15°3′14″E
- Country: Poland
- Voivodeship: West Pomeranian
- County: Gryfice
- Gmina: Gryfice
- Population: 20

Podłęcze [pɔdˈwɛnt͡ʂɛ] is a village in the administrative district of Gmina Gryfice, within Gryfice County, West Pomeranian Voivodeship, in north-western Poland. It lies approximately 13 km (8 mi) south-west of Gryfice and 57 km (35 mi) north-east of the regional capital Szczecin.

For the history of the region, see History of Pomerania and History of Gryfice.

The village has a population of 20.
