= Lubin, Gryfice County =

Lubin
- Settlement
- Location within Poland
- Coordinates: 53°52′28″N 15°13′21″E
- Country: Poland
- Voivodeship: West Pomeranian
- County: Gryfice
- Gmina: Gryfice
- Population: 68

Lubin (Polish pronunciation: [ˈlubin]; formerly German: Lebbin) is a settlement in the administrative district of Gmina Gryfice, within Gryfice County, West Pomeranian Voivodeship, in north-western Poland. It lies approximately 5 kilometres (3 mi) south of Gryfice and 67 km (42 mi) north-east of the regional capital Szczecin.

For the history of the region, see History of Pomerania.

The settlement has a population of 68.
