= Rotnowo =

- Village
- Location within Poland
- Coordinates: 53°54′15″N 15°17′3″E
- Country: Poland
- Voivodeship: West Pomeranian
- County: Gryfice
- Gmina: Gryfice
- Population: 173

Rotnowo [rɔtˈnɔvɔ] (German: Rottnow) is a village in the administrative district of Gmina Gryfice, within Gryfice County, West Pomeranian Voivodeship, in north-western Poland. It lies approximately 6 km (4 mi) east of Gryfice and 72 km (45 mi) north-east of the regional capital Szczecin.

The village has a population of 173.

Before 1637 the area was part of Duchy of Pomerania. For the history of the region, see History of Pomerania.
