= Rzęsin =

- Settlement
- Location within Poland
- Coordinates: 53°53′25″N 15°7′19″E
- Country: Poland
- Voivodeship: West Pomeranian
- County: Gryfice
- Gmina: Gryfice
- Population: 206

Rzęsin [ˈʐɛ̃ɕin] is a settlement in the administrative district of Gmina Gryfice, within Gryfice County, West Pomeranian Voivodeship, in north-western Poland. It lies approximately 6 kilometres (4 mi) south-west of Gryfice and 64 km (40 mi) north-east of the regional capital Szczecin.

For the history of the region, see History of Pomerania.

The settlement has a population of 206.
