= Von Loppenow =

Noble family from Germany

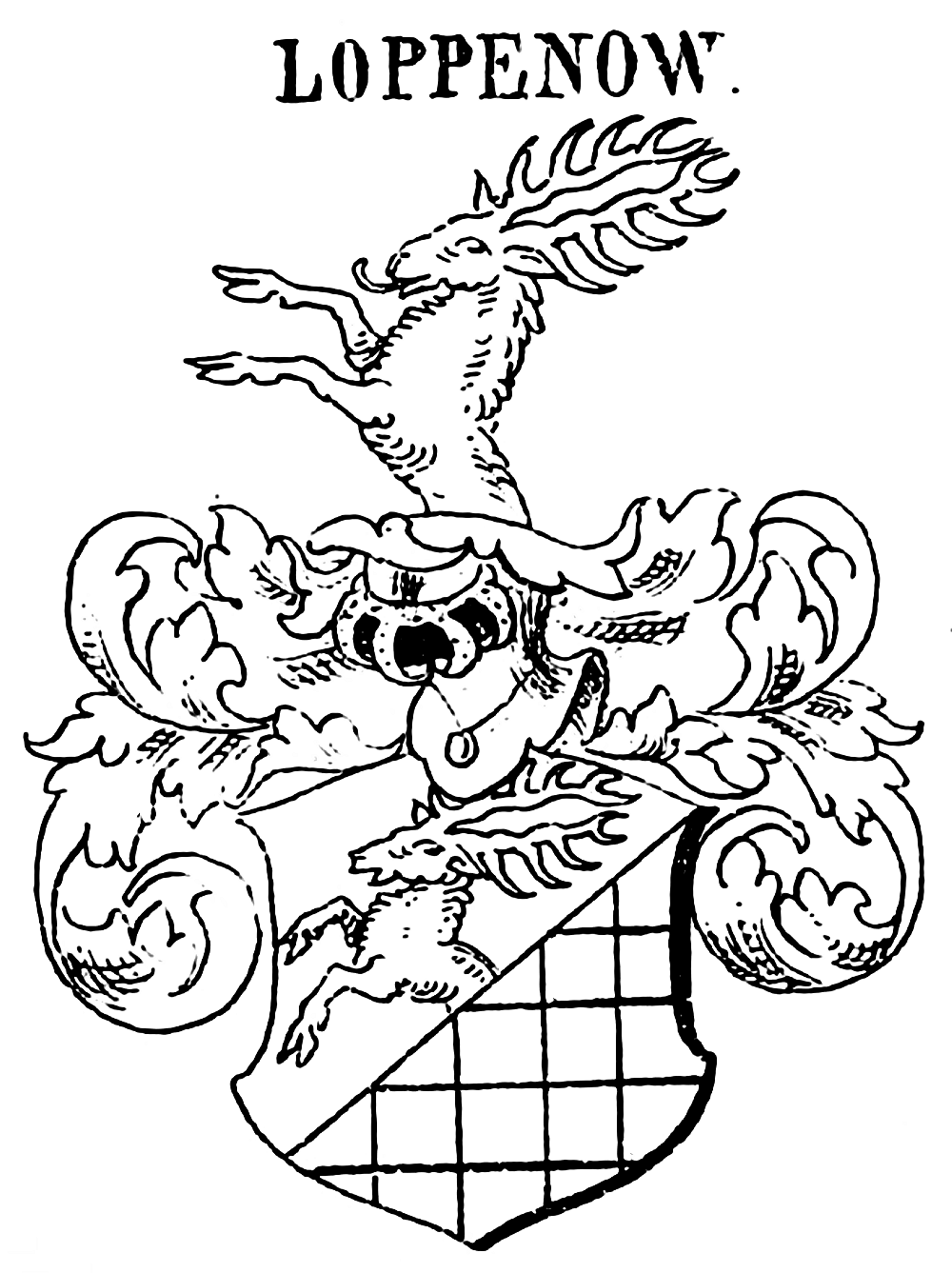
Coat of arms of the Loppenow family

The Loppenow family was a German noble family associated with the village of Loppnow in Prussian Pomerania (today Lopianow in Poland).

== History ==
The ancestral home of the von Loppenow family was the village of Loppnow (variants: Loppenow, Lopianow) and its surrounding lands. Joachim von Loppenow was seated in the year 1463 over the Loppenow estate. In 1665 his descendant, Jacob von Loppenow and his male descendants were given feudal rights called "immediat Lehn" (fief) by Frederick William I, Elector of Brandenburg, adopted at Cölln on the Spree on November 21, 1666. An "immediat Lehn" confers rights which are given directly from the ruler, "immediat" meaning "without mediator", and "Lehn" pertaining to feudal rights over a manor and its estates, and possibly over an additional manor. The rights were to end upon the death of the last male heir of this line, which was a typical feature of the feudal system

The village church was built in the 17th century and once held the "carved wood and polychrome coats of arms " of the family von Loppenow.

The last male heirs of this line were the sons of Claus von Loppenow, namely, Councilor Adam Bernhardt v. Loppenow who died in 1726, with no sons, and the Royal Swedish Oberstlieutenant and Adjutant-General, afterwards police captain, Johann Karl von Loppenow who died March 5, 1729, with no sons. On July 20, 1730, the feudal holding was granted to Hans Gebhard Edler von Plotho, by Friedrich Wilhelm I.

== Place name ==
Following the expulsion of Germans after World War II the village of Loppenow/Loppnow was renamed Lopianow. The -ow suffix indicates that the area was likely a Slavic settlement before it was given a German name.
