= Sokołów, West Pomeranian Voivodeship =

Sokołów
- Settlement
- Location within Poland
- Coordinates: 53°53′55″N 15°14′40″E
- Country: Poland
- Voivodeship: West Pomeranian
- County: Gryfice
- Gmina: Gryfice

Sokołów [sɔˈkɔwuf] (German: Danckelmannshof) is a settlement in the administrative district of Gmina Gryfice, within Gryfice County, West Pomeranian Voivodeship, in north-western Poland. It lies approximately 4 kilometres (2 mi) south-east of Gryfice and 70 km (43 mi) north-east of the regional capital Szczecin.

For the history of the region, see History of Pomerania.
