= Wołczyno =

- Village
- Location within Poland
- Coordinates: 53°53′45″N 15°4′12″E
- Country: Poland
- Voivodeship: West Pomeranian
- County: Gryfice
- Gmina: Gryfice

Wołczyno [vɔu̯ˈt͡ʂɨnɔ] is a village in the administrative district of Gmina Gryfice, within Gryfice County, West Pomeranian Voivodeship, in north-western Poland. It lies approximately 9 kilometres (6 mi) west of Gryfice and 63 km (39 mi) north-east of the regional capital Szczecin.
