= Waniorowo =

- Village
- Location within Poland
- Coordinates: 53°50′20″N 15°11′39″E
- Country: Poland
- Voivodeship: West Pomeranian
- County: Gryfice
- Gmina: Gryfice
- Population: 72

Waniorowo [vaɲɔˈrɔvɔ] (German: Vahnerow) is a village in the administrative district of Gmina Gryfice, within Gryfice County, West Pomeranian Voivodeship, in north-western Poland. It lies approximately 9 km (6 mi) south of Gryfice and 62 km (39 mi) north-east of the regional capital Szczecin.

The village has a population of 72.

Before 1637 the area was part of Duchy of Pomerania. For the history of the region, see History of Pomerania.
