= List of shipwrecks in November 1884 =

The list of shipwrecks in November 1884 includes ships sunk, foundered, grounded, or otherwise lost during November 1884.

== 2 November ==
List of shipwrecks: 2 November 1884
Ship	State	Description
Fremad	Norway	The schooner was driven ashore and wreck on Inchgarvie, in the Firth of Forth. Her crew were rescued. She was on a voyage from Bo'ness, Lothian, United Kingdom to Grimstad.

== 3 November ==
List of shipwrecks: 3 November 1884
Ship	State	Description
Petrel	United Kingdom	The schooner was driven ashore and wrecked at Haselburn Whiting Bay, New Brunswick, Canada. Her crew were rescued.

== 4 November ==
List of shipwrecks: 4 November 1884
Ship	State	Description
Anatolia	United Kingdom	The steamship was run into by the steamship Tintern Abbey (United Kingdom) and sank off the coast of Spain.
Claudia, and Polam	United Kingdom; Italy	The steamships collided with each other and both sank. Their crews were rescued by the steamship Eident (Flag unknown). Claudia was on a voyage from Genoa to Benisaf, Algeria. Polam was on a voyage from South Shields, County Durham to Genoa.
East Goodwin Lightship	Trinity House	The lightship was run into by the steamship Bencayo (United Kingdom) and was severely damaged. She was withdrawn from service for repairs.

== 6 November ==
List of shipwrecks: 6 November 1884
Ship	State	Description
Brixham	United Kingdom	The steamship foundered off Cape Finisterre, Spain. Her crew were rescued.
Clyde	New South Wales	The barque ran aground off Banks Peninsula, New Zealand and sank, with the loss of seventeen of her eighteen crew. She was on a voyage from Mauritius to Lyttelton, New Zealand.

== 7 November ==
List of shipwrecks: 7 November 1884
Ship	State	Description
Blanche	United Kingdom	The steamship was run into by the steamship John Bowes (United Kingdom) and sank in the River Thames at London.

== 8 November ==
List of shipwrecks: 8 November 1884
Ship	State	Description
Schelde and Rhyn	United Kingdom	The steamship foundered in the Atlantic Ocean. Her crew took to the boats, but one of them was subsequently lost before they reached the Brazilian coast. She was on a voyage from Antwerp, Belgium to Buenos Aires, Argentina.

== 9 November ==
List of shipwrecks: 9 November 1884
Ship	State	Description
Broder	Flag unknown	The schooner was driven ashore and wrecked at Whitehaven, Cumberland, United Kingdom. Her crew were rescued. She was on a voyage from Whitehaven to Christiania, Norway.

== 10 November ==
List of shipwrecks: 10 November 1884
Ship	State	Description
Agatha	United Kingdom	The fishing sloop was run into by the schooner Hannibal (United Kingdom) and sank 7 nautical miles (13 km) south south east of Start Point, Devon with the loss of one of her three crews.
Vanessa	United Kingdom	The yacht collided with the steamship RMS Don (United Kingdom) off Anvil Point, Dorset and was severely damaged with the loss of a crew member. She was beached at Swanage, Dorset.
Wickwick	United Kingdom	The steamship was driven ashore 3 nautical miles (5.6 km) south of Sunniside, County Durham. She was refloated and resumed her voyage.

== 13 November ==
List of shipwrecks: 13 November 1884
Ship	State	Description
Emma	Norway	The barque ran aground at Waterford, United Kingdom. She was on a voyage from Mexico to Havre de Grâce, Seine-Inférieure, France.

== 14 November ==
List of shipwrecks: 14 November 1884
Ship	State	Description
Amoy	Flag unknown	The ship was wrecked on the coast of Iceland. Her crew survived.
Geertruide Sarauw	Flag unknown	The ship was wrecked on the coast of Iceland. Her crew survived.

== 15 November ==
List of shipwrecks: 15 November 1884
Ship	State	Description
Barone	United Kingdom	The Mersey Flat collided with the schooner Mary Capper (United Kingdom) and was beached at Birkenhead, Cheshire.
Glendower	United Kingdom	The steamship ran aground in Lake Timsah. She was on a voyage from Singapore, Straits Settlements to London.
Jane Stevenson	United Kingdom	The fishing smack collided with the steamship Albanian (United Kingdom) and sank in the Humber. Her crew survived.
Soon	Norway	The barque was driven ashore and wrecked at Torrevieja, Spain. Her crew were rescued.
Unnamed	Flag unknown	The schooner was driven ashore in the Carlingford Lough.

== 16 November ==
List of shipwrecks: 16 November 1884
Ship	State	Description
Ripon	United Kingdom	The steamship collided with the steamship Essex (United Kingdom) and was beached at Hull, Yorkshire. Ripon was on a voyage from Alexandria, Egypt to Hull. She was refloated on 22 November.

== 18 November ==
List of shipwrecks: 18 November 1884
Ship	State	Description
Charles Townsend Hook	United Kingdom	The steamship departed from Saigon, French Indo-China for Hong Kong. No further trace, reported overdue.

== 19 November ==
List of shipwrecks: 19 November 1884
Ship	State	Description
Silentium	Sweden	The barque collided with the steamship Pennland (Belgium) and sank off the Goodwin Sands, Kent, United Kingdom. Her crew were rescued.
Vivid	United Kingdom	The schooner ran aground at Wexford. She was on a voyage from Glasgow, Renfrewship to Wexford. She was refloated and taken in to Wexford in a leaky condition.

== 20 November ==
List of shipwrecks: 20 November 1884
Ship	State	Description
Trio	United Kingdom	The brig ran aground at Ballyshannon, County Donegal.

== 21 November ==
List of shipwrecks: 21 November 1884
Ship	State	Description
James McMahon	United States	The tug sank when her boiler exploded in Long Island Sound. Two of her crew were killed.
Ottercaps	United Kingdom	The steamship struck the pier at Boulogne, Pas-de-Calais, France and ran aground. She was severely damaged. She was refloated on 1 December.

== 22 November ==
List of shipwrecks: 22 November 1884
Ship	State	Description
Arnoldie	United Kingdom	The ketch was driven ashore at Gorleston, Suffolk. Her crew were rescued by rocket apparatus. She was on a voyage from Ipswich, Suffolk to Hull, Yorkshire.
Chandler J. Wells	United States	The schooner ran aground in Lake Michigan off Whiskey Island, Michigan.
Flora	United Kingdom	The schooner ran aground on the Goodwin Sands, Kent. She was refloated with assistance and taken in to Dover, Kent in a leaky condition.
Wave	United Kingdom	The fishing lugger was run into by the fishing lugger Hildegarde (United Kingdom) and sank off Lowestoft, Suffolk.

== 24 November ==
List of shipwrecks: 24 November 1884
Ship	State	Description
Caspian	United Kingdom	The steamship arrived at Liverpool, Lancashire on fire. She was on a voyage from Baltimore, Maryland, United States to Liverpool. The fire was extinguished.
Restless	United Kingdom	The ship ran aground on the Haisborough Sands, in the Norfh Sea off the coast of Norfolk. She was on a voyage from Runcorn, Cheshire to Newcastle upon Tyne, Northumberland. She was refloated and beached at Winterton-on-Sea, Norfolk. Her crew were rescued.

== 25 November ==
List of shipwrecks: 25 November 1884
Ship	State	Description
Gwendoline	United Kingdom	The steamship ran aground at Atherfield, Isle of Wight. She was on a voyage from the Black Sea to Hamburg, Germany. She was refloated on 27 November and taken in to Cowes, Isle of Wight.
Princess of Thule	United Kingdom	The ship was driven ashore at Brook, Isle of Wight. She was on a voyage from Safi, Morocco to Montrose, Forfarshire.

== 26 November ==
List of shipwrecks: 26 November 1884
Ship	State	Description
Durango	United Kingdom	The steamship collided with the barque Luke Bruce (United Kingdom) and sank off the South Foreland, Kent with the loss of all 21 crew. Durango was on a voyage from Dunkirk, Nord, France to Dartmouth, Devon.

== 27 November ==
List of shipwrecks: 27 November 1884
Ship	State	Description
Kate	United Kingdom	The steam yacht was driven ashore and damaged in Gourock Bay. She was subsequently placed under repair.
Sallie	United Kingdom	The ketch collided with the brig Kate ( (United Kingdom of Great Britain and Ireland) Guernsey) and foundered off the Tongue Lightship ( Trinity House). Her crew were rescued.
Usko	Russia	The barque ran aground on the Goodwin Sands, Kent, United Kingdom. Her crew were rescued by the tug Cruiser (United Kingdom). Usko was on a voyage from a Swedish port to Marseille, Bouches-du-Rhône, France. She was a total loss.

== 28 November ==
List of shipwrecks: 28 November 1884
Ship	State	Description
St. Claire	United Kingdom	The steamship was damaged by fire at Leith, Lothian.
Embla	Norway	The barque ran aground off Mundesley, Norfolk in thick fog, bound for Christianssund from Cardiff, with a cargo of timber. All 10 crew were rescued by the RNLI Mundesley lifeboat.

== 29 November ==
List of shipwrecks: 29 November 1884
Ship	State	Description
Hermann Friedrich	United Kingdom	The brig put in to Falmouth, Cornwall, United Kingdom on fire. She was on a voyage from Wilmington, Delaware, United States to Bremen.
Juno	Netherlands	The steamship ran aground at Palermo, Sicily, Italy.

== Unknown date ==
List of shipwrecks: Unknown date in November 1884
Ship	State	Description
Agenoria	United Kingdom	The ship was driven ashore on the Danish coast. She had been refloated by 29 November.
Artos	United Kingdom	The steamship ran aground on the Doganastan Shoal, in the Sea of Marmara. She was on a voyage from Cardiff, Glamorgan to Odesa, Russia. She was refloated in mid-December and taken in to Messina, Sicily, Italy.
Andrew Johnson	United States	The full-rigged ship collided with the full-rigged ship Thirlmere (United Kingdom) and sank in the Atlantic Ocean with the loss of seventeen of her crew. Andrew Johnson was on a voyage from Iquique, Peru to Hamburg, Germany.
Anna	Denmark	The schooner was driven ashore on the Danish coast. She was later refloated with the assistance of a steamship and taken in to Fredrikshavn.
Anna Victoria	Russia	The brigantine was driven ashore on Rügen, Germany.
Atlas	United Kingdom	The barque was wrecked at Cape Ray, Newfoundland Colony. Her crew were rescued. she was on a voyage from Quebec City, Canada to Liverpool, Lancashire.
Bertha	(United Kingdom of Great Britain and Ireland) Guernsey	The barquentine ran aground on the Shoebury Sand, in the Thames Estuary off the coast of Essex. She was refloated on 15 November and taken in to Shoeburyness, Essex.
British Princess	United Kingdom	The barque collided with the steamship Tyrian (United Kingdom) and was beached at Greenock, Renfrewshire.
Caledonia	United Kingdom	The schooner ran aground on the Grain Spit, in the Thames Estuary.
Caroline	United Kingdom	The smack ran aground on the Cross Sand, in the North Sea off the coast of Suffolk and was abandoned by her crew. She was subsequently boarded by some of the crew of the lugger Charles and Sarah. She was refloated and taken in to Lowestoft, Suffolk.
Chesterfield	United Kingdom	The sloop was holed by her anchor and sank in the Humber.
Clare	United Kingdom	The schooner ran aground at Caernarfon. She was on a voyage from Caernarfon to Grimsby, Lincolnshire.
Concordia	United Kingdom	The ship was holed by her anchor in the Cromarty Firth. She was on a voyage from a Baltic port to Dingwall, Ross-shire. She was refloated and towed in to Invergordon, Ross-shire.
Douglas	United Kingdom	The steamship struck a submerged object and sank at Sunderland, County Durham.
Emma	Russia	The schooner foundered in the North Sea before 9 November. Her crew were rescued by the steamship Hikarakow (Denmark). Emma was on a voyage from Hartlepool, County Durham, to Riga.
Excelsior	United Kingdom	The fishing smack collided with another vessel and was driven ashore in the Humber. She was abandoned by her crew. She was subsequently refloated and towed in to Hull, Yorkshire by the tug Humber (United Kingdom).
Expert	United Kingdom	The ship was driven ashore at Stonehaven, Aberdeenshire.
Falabah	France	The steamship ran aground at Senegal.
Fides	Germany	The ship was wrecked on the coast of Mozambique. Her crew were rescued.
Frank Emmet	United Kingdom	The ship was holed by the anchor of the brigantine Adelaide (United Kingdom and sank in Sutton Pool, Devon.
Fred	Norway	The brig was driven ashore and wrecked on Martinique.
Fredericke Louise	Denmark	The brigantine was driven ashore at "Sonderose". She was on a voyage from Sundsvall, Sweden to Grimsby.
Giovanni	Italy	The ship ran aground in the Schuylkill River. She was on a voyage from Agrigento, Sicily to Philadelphia, Pennsylvania, United States.
Glenesk	France	The steamship was destroyed by fire at sea before 4 November. Her crew were rescued.
Hansa	Germany	The schooner was driven ashore at Ossby, Öland, Sweden. She was on a voyage from Vestervik, Sweden to Rio de Janeiro, Brazil.
Iolanthe	United Kingdom	The steamship ran aground near Bonny, Africa. She was on a voyage from Liverpool to the Brass River.
Invincible	United Kingdom	The ship was wrecked on "Kirk Island". She was on a voyage from Haiti to Rotterdam, South Holland, Netherlands.
Jessie Rae	United Kingdom	The schooner was driven ashore at "Angus", County Down. She was on a voyage from Strangford, County Down to Maryport, Cumberland.
John Hutton	United Kingdom	The tug sprang a leak and sank at Newcastle upon Tyne, Northumberland.
Joseph Andre	United Kingdom	The ship was wrecked.
Jupiter	United Kingdom	The ship was driven ashore at "Traverse", Quebec, Canada. She was refloated with the assistance of a steamship and put back to Quebec City.
Letterfourie	United Kingdom	The barque was wrecked at "Bjeador", Spanish East Indies. Her crew were rescued.
Lucy Ann	United Kingdom	The ship was driven ashore and wrecked on Walney Island, Lancashire. Her crew were rescued by the tug Barrow (United Kingdom). Lucy Ann was on a voyage from Ballyshannon, County Donegal to Barrow-in-Furness, Lancashire.
Maria Repetto	Italy	The ship was driven ashore at Cape Henlopen, North Carolina, United States.
Mary	United Kingdom	The schooner was run into by a steamship and sank off the Monkstone Lighthouse, Glamorgan. Her crew were rescued by the steamship.
Mayo	United Kingdom	The steamship caught fire at Liverpool and was scuttled. She was on a voyage from Cartagena, Spain to Liverpool.
Menai Straits	United Kingdom	The ship put in to Salvador, Falkland Islands on fire before 25 November. She was on a voyage from Fleetwood, Lancashire to Antofagasta, Chile. She burnt out and sank.
Nanna	United Kingdom	The ship was wrecked at Quebec City with some loss of life.
North Star	United Kingdom	The schooner was driven ashore on Skagen, Denmark. She was on a voyage from Danzig, Germany to Rouen, Seine-Inférieure, France. She was refloated with the assistance of a steamship and taken in to Fredrikshavn.
O. B. Stillman	United States	The ship was abandoned in the Atlantic Ocean.
Perle	United Kingdom	The schooner was driven ashore and wrecked 2 nautical miles (3.7 km) east of Dunbar, Lothian.
Remittant	United Kingdom	The ship ran aground at Penang, Straits Settlements. She was later refloated.
Rex	Flag unknown	The steamship ran aground off Hveen, Sweden. She was on a voyage from Bordeaux, Gironde, France to Malmö and Stockholm, Sweden. She was refloated with assistance.
Rosebank	United Kingdom	The schooner was holed by ice and sank in the Haff.
Skyro	United Kingdom	The steamship was driven ashore on Öland, Sweden. She was on a voyage from Kronstadt, Russia to London. She was refloated and taken in to Karlskrona, Sweden in a leaky condition.
Sophia	United Kingdom	The brig ran aground on the English Bank, in the River Plate. She was reflaoted with assistance.
Sorsegon	Spain	The steamship was driven ashore at "Caniao", Spanish East Indies.
Spinaway	United Kingdom	The ship was wrecked on "Kirk Island". She was on a voyage from Haiti to Rotterdam.
St. George	United Kingdom	The steamship was driven ashore at Noordwijk, South Holland. She was on a voyage from Kronstadt to Rotterdam.
Sultan	United Kingdom	The ship ran aground on the Devil's Bank, in the River Mersey.
T. E. Forster	United Kingdom	The ship ran aground on the Tongue Sand, in the North Sea. She was on a voyage from Havre de Grâce, Seine-Inférieure, France to Newcastle upon Tyne. She was refloated and taken in to the River Thames in a leaky condition.
Thetis	Germany	The schooner was driven ashore at Stuthof. She was on a voyage from Danzig to "Voil".
Thropton	United Kingdom	The steamship was driven ashore in the Rabbit Islands, Ottoman Empire. She was on a voyage from Sulina, Romania to Gibraltar.
Tordenskjold	Norway	The barque was abandoned in the Atlantic Ocean before 6 November.
Vincenzo Accame	Italy	The barque was destroyed by fire at sea. Her crew were rescued.
Violet	United Kingdom	The schooner was driven ashore at Goswick, Northumberland. She was on a voyage from London to Berwick upon Tweed, Northumberland. She was refloated on 12 November and towed in to Berwick upon Tweed by a tug.
Wasp	United Kingdom	The smack was wrecked on the Long Rock with the loss of two of her three crew. She was on a voyage from Maryport, Cumberland to Portaferry, County Down.
Wilhelm	Germany	The ship foundered at the mouth of the River Tay. Her crew were rescued. She was on a voyage from Leven, Fife, United Kingdom to Brake.
Young Greg	United Kingdom	The smack was reported to have foundered in the North Sea with the loss of all four crew. She was subsequently towed in to Hull in a waterlogged condition.
Unnamed	United Kingdom	The tug sank at Portpatrick, Wigtownshire.
