= Borzęcin, West Pomeranian Voivodeship =

Borzęcin
- Village
- Location within Poland
- Coordinates: 53°58′52″N 15°16′39″E
- Country: Poland
- Voivodeship: West Pomeranian
- County: Gryfice
- Gmina: Gryfice
- Population: 121

Borzęcin [bɔˈʐɛnt͡ɕin] (German: Borntin) is a village in the administrative district of Gmina Gryfice, within Gryfice County, West Pomeranian Voivodeship, in north-western Poland. It lies approximately 9 km (6 mi) north-east of Gryfice and 78 km (48 mi) north-east of the regional capital Szczecin.

The village has a population of 121.
