= Zagórcze, West Pomeranian Voivodeship =

Zagórcze
- Village
- Location within Poland
- Coordinates: 53°50′36″N 15°6′57″E
- Country: Poland
- Voivodeship: West Pomeranian
- County: Gryfice
- Gmina: Gryfice

Zagórcze [zaˈɡurt͡ʂɛ] (formerly German: Eleonorenhof) is a village in the administrative district of Gmina Gryfice, within Gryfice County, West Pomeranian Voivodeship, in north-western Poland. It lies approximately 10 kilometres (6 mi) south-west of Gryfice and 59 km (37 mi) north-east of the regional capital Szczecin.

For the history of the region, see History of Pomerania.
