= Ościęcin =

- Village
- Location within Poland
- Coordinates: 53°49′48″N 15°4′33″E
- Country: Poland
- Voivodeship: West Pomeranian
- County: Gryfice
- Gmina: Gryfice

Ościęcin [ɔɕˈt͡ɕɛnt͡ɕin] (German: Woistenthin) is a village in the administrative district of Gmina Gryfice, within Gryfice County, West Pomeranian Voivodeship, in north-western Poland. It lies approximately 13 km (8 mi) south-west of Gryfice and 57 km (35 mi) north-east of the regional capital Szczecin.

== See also ==
- History of Pomerania
