= Grębocin, West Pomeranian Voivodeship =

Grębocin
- Settlement
- Location within Poland
- Coordinates: 53°51′3″N 15°12′25″E
- Country: Poland
- Voivodeship: West Pomeranian
- County: Gryfice
- Gmina: Gryfice
- Population: 76

Grębocin [ɡrɛmˈbɔt͡ɕin] is a settlement in the administrative district of Gmina Gryfice, within Gryfice County, West Pomeranian Voivodeship, in north-western Poland. It lies approximately 8 kilometres (5 mi) south of Gryfice and 64 km (40 mi) north-east of the regional capital Szczecin.

For the history of the region, see History of Pomerania.

The settlement has a population of 76.
