= Zielin, Gryfice County =

Zielin
- Village
- Location within Poland
- Coordinates: 53°56′35″N 15°12′45″E
- Country: Poland
- Voivodeship: West Pomeranian
- County: Gryfice
- Gmina: Gryfice

Zielin [ˈʑɛlin] (German: Sellin) is a village in the administrative district of Gmina Gryfice, within Gryfice County, West Pomeranian Voivodeship, in north-western Poland. It lies approximately 4 km (2 mi) north of Gryfice and 72 km (45 mi) north-east of the regional capital Szczecin.

Before 1637 the area was part of Duchy of Pomerania. For the history of the region, see History of Pomerania.
