= Przybiernówko =

- Village
- Location within Poland
- Coordinates: 53°57′12″N 15°7′57″E
- Country: Poland
- Voivodeship: West Pomeranian
- County: Gryfice
- Gmina: Gryfice
- Population: 449

Przybiernówko [pʂɨbjɛrˈnufkɔ] (German: Deutsch Pribbernow) is a village in the administrative district of Gmina Gryfice, within Gryfice County, West Pomeranian Voivodeship, in north-western Poland. It lies approximately 7 km (4 mi) north-west of Gryfice and 70 km (43 mi) north-east of the regional capital Szczecin.

Before 1637 the area was part of the Duchy of Pomerania. In 1815–1945 it was part of the Province of Pomerania. For the history of the region, see History of Pomerania.

The village has a population of 449.
