= Łopianów =

- Village
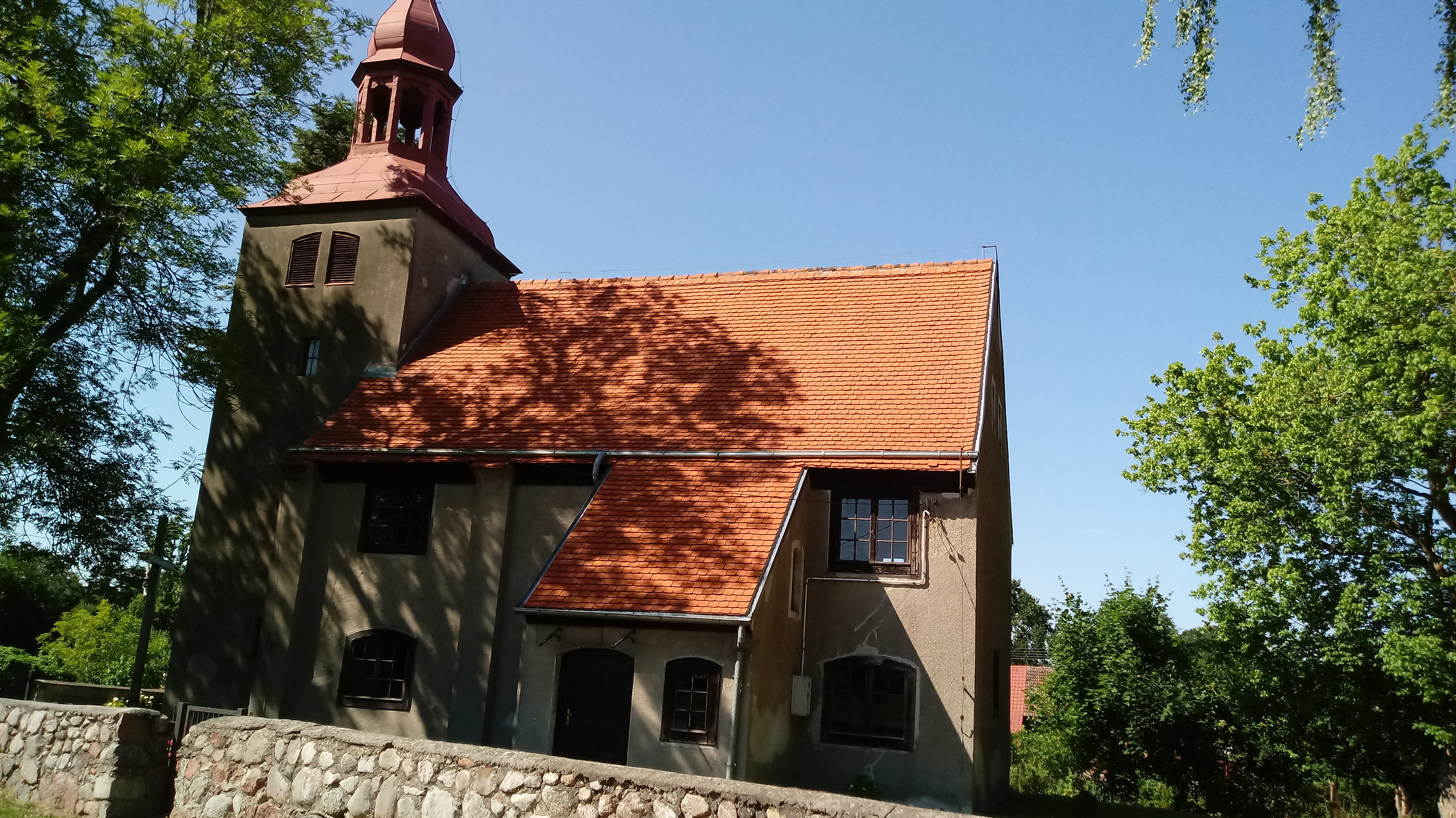
- Church of the Sacred Heart of Jesus

- Location within Poland
- Coordinates: 53°52′27″N 15°15′37″E
- Country: Poland
- Voivodeship: West Pomeranian
- County: Gryfice
- Gmina: Gryfice

Population
  - Total: 68

Łopianów [wɔˈpjanuf] (German: Loppnow) is a village in the administrative district of Gmina Gryfice, within Gryfice County, West Pomeranian Voivodeship, in north-western Poland. It lies approximately 7 km (4 mi) south-east of Gryfice and 68 km (42 mi) north-east of the regional capital Szczecin.

For the history of the region, see History of Pomerania.

The village has a population of 68.
