= Gustav von Struensee =

German writer

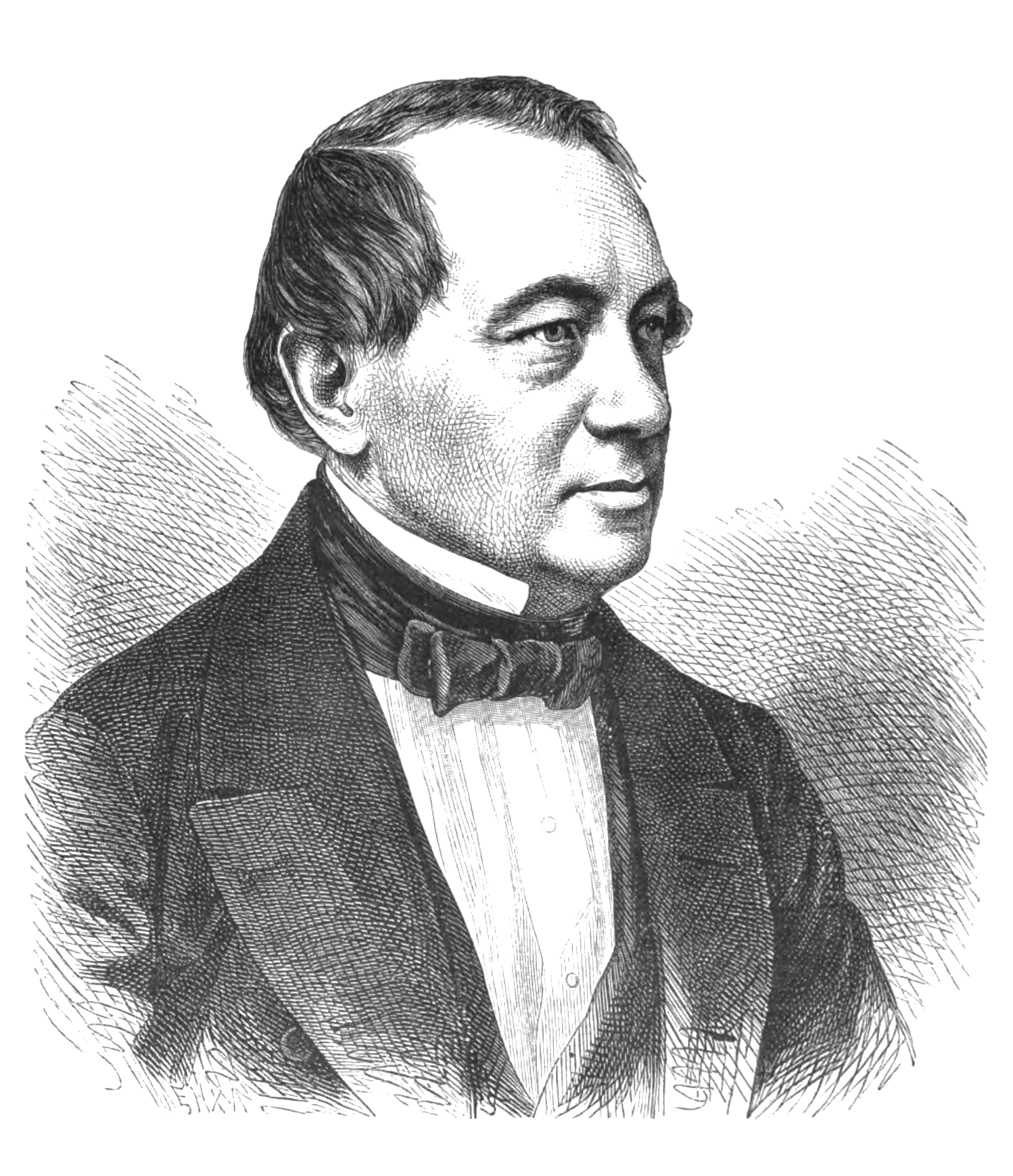
Gustav von Struensee

Gustav von Struensee (13 December 1803, Greifenberg in Pommern – 29 September 1875. Breslau) was a German writer.
