= Niekładź =

- Settlement
- Location within Poland
- Coordinates: 53°55′56″N 15°11′28″E
- Country: Poland
- Voivodeship: West Pomeranian
- County: Gryfice
- Gmina: Gryfice
- Population: 107

Niekładź [ˈɲɛkwat͡ɕ] (formerly German Neklatz) is a settlement in the administrative district of Gmina Gryfice, within Gryfice County, West Pomeranian Voivodeship, in northwestern Poland. It lies approximately 3 kilometres (2 mi) north of Gryfice and 70 km (43 mi) north-east of the regional capital Szczecin. The settlement has a population of 107.
