= Zaleszczyce =

- Village
- Location within Poland
- Coordinates: 53°54′16″N 15°09′10″E
- Country: Poland
- Voivodeship: West Pomeranian
- County: Gryfice
- Gmina: Gryfice

Zaleszczyce [zalɛʂˈt͡ʂɨt͡sɛ] (German: Stuthof) is a village in the administrative district of Gmina Gryfice, within Gryfice County, West Pomeranian Voivodeship, in north-western Poland. It lies approximately 4 km (2 mi) west of Gryfice and 66 km (41 mi) north-east of the regional capital Szczecin.

Before 1637 the area was part of Duchy of Pomerania. In 1939 the population of Stuthof consisted of 22 persons. For the history of the region, see History of Pomerania.
