= Gmina Gryfice =

Gmina Gryfice Gryfice Commune
- Gmina
- Flag Coat of arms
- Interactive map of Gmina Gryfice
- Coordinates (Gryfice): 53°54′53″N 15°11′55″E
- Country: Poland
- Voivodeship: West Pomeranian
- County: Gryfice
- Seat: Gryfice

Area
  - Total: 261.63 km^{2} (101.02 sq mi)

Population (2006)
  - Total: 23,487
  - Density: 89.772/km^{2} (232.51/sq mi)
  - Urban: 16,702
  - Rural: 6,785
- Website: http://gryfice.eu/

Gmina Gryfice is an urban-rural gmina (administrative district) in Gryfice County, West Pomeranian Voivodeship, in north-western Poland. Its seat is the town of Gryfice, which lies approximately 69 kilometres (43 mi) north-east of the regional capital Szczecin.

The gmina covers an area of 261.63 square kilometres (101.0 sq mi), and as of 2006 its total population is 23,487 (out of which the population of Gryfice amounts to 16,702, and the population of the rural part of the gmina is 6,785).

== Villages ==
Apart from the town of Gryfice, Gmina Gryfice contains the villages and settlements of Barkowo, Baszewice, Borzęcin, Borzyszewo, Brodniki, Dobrzyń, Dziadowo, Górzyca, Grądy, Grębocin, Grochów, Jabłonowo, Jasiel, Kołomąć, Kowalewo, Krakowice, Kukań, Łopianów, Lubieszewo, Lubin, Lubków, Mierzyn, Niedźwiedziska, Niekładź, Ościęcin, Otok, Podłęcze, Popiele, Prusinowo, Przybiernówko, Raduń, Rotnowo, Rybokarty, Rzęsin, Rzęskowo, Sikory, Skalin, Skowrony, Smolęcin, Sokołów, Stawno, Świeszewo, Trzygłów, Waniorowo, Wilczkowo, Witno, Wołczyno, Zacisze, Zagórcze, Zaleszczyce and Zielin.

== Neighbouring gminas ==
Gmina Gryfice is bordered by the gminas of Brojce, Golczewo, Karnice, Płoty, Świerzno and Trzebiatów.
