= Lędzin =

- Village
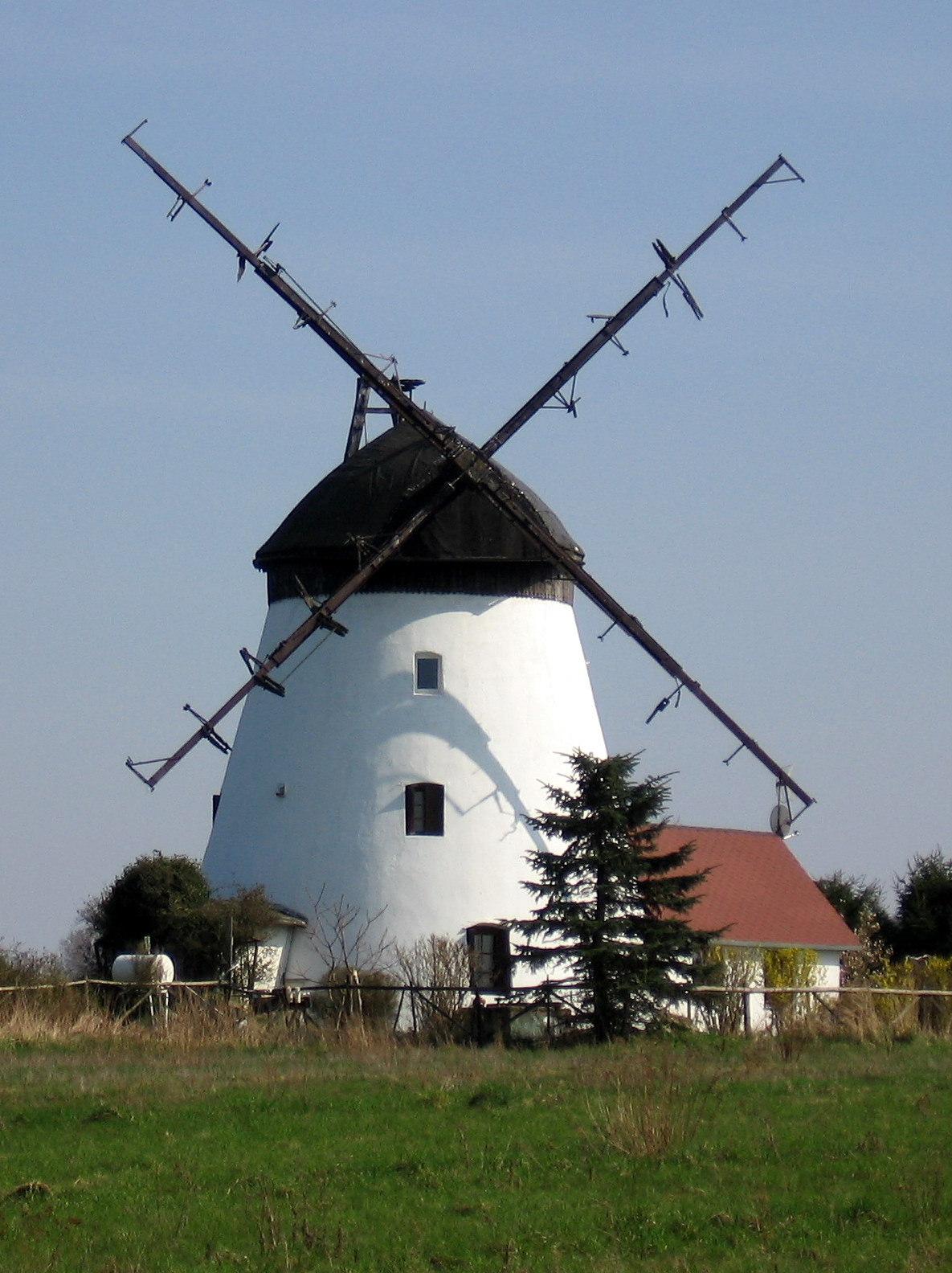
- Windmill in Lędzin

- Location within Poland
- Coordinates: 54°4′14″N 15°4′27″E
- Country: Poland
- Voivodeship: West Pomeranian
- County: Gryfice
- Gmina: Karnice

Lędzin [ˈlɛnd͡ʑin] (German: Lensin) is a village in the administrative district of Gmina Karnice, within Gryfice County, West Pomeranian Voivodeship, in north-western Poland. It lies approximately 5 km (3 mi) north of Karnice, 20 km (12 mi) north-west of Gryfice, and 80 km (50 mi) north-east of the regional capital Szczecin.

For the history of the region, see History of Pomerania.
