= Mrzeżyno =

- searesort, fishing settlement
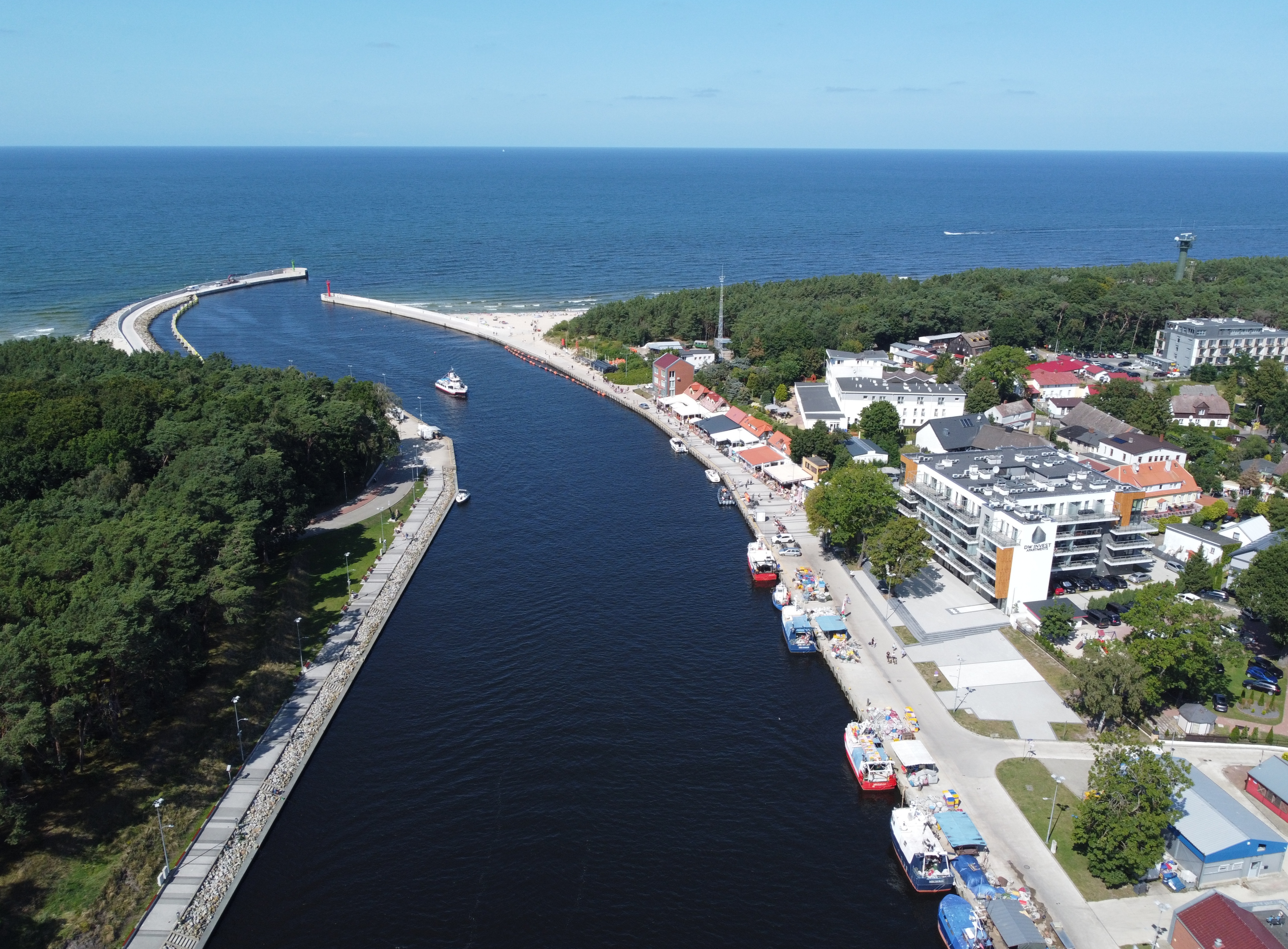
- East side of Mrzeżyno and estuary of Rega

- Location within Poland
- Coordinates: 54°08′38″N 15°17′30″E
- Country: Poland
- Voivodeship: West Pomeranian
- County: Gryfice
- Gmina: Trzebiatów
- Established: 1457

Population (2009-12)
  - Total: 1 611
- Time zone: UTC+1 (CET)
  - Summer (DST): UTC+2 (CEST)
- Postal code: 72-330
- Car plates: ZGY
- Website: http://www.mrzezyno.pl

Mrzeżyno [mʐɛˈʐɨnɔ] (German: Deep) is a village with a fishing seaport in northwestern Poland, situated near the estuary of the Rega river, on the coast of the Baltic Sea in the historic region of Pomerania. Administratively it is located in Gmina Trzebiatów, Gryfice County, West Pomeranian Voivodeship. It is also a health resort with many pensions, campsites and a spa, and it has a popular beach. It lies approximately 10 km (6 mi) north of Trzebiatów, 27 km (17 mi) north of Gryfice, and 94 km (58 mi) north-east of the regional capital Szczecin.

Every year in July and August, Mrzeżyno is visited by many Polish and German tourists. The right riverside is more developed than left, where there is only one settlement. The population numbers 1,727.^{(2009)} The village is situated by a special area of the conservation of nature according to the European Union's program Natura 2000.

Mrzeżyno is a garrison of the 36th Air Defense Missile Squadron of the Polish Air Force.

== History ==
The area became part of the emerging Polish state in the 10th century. Following Poland's fragmentation, it formed part of the Duchy of Pomerania, at various times also under Danish and Holy Roman Empire suzerainty. From the 18th century it was part of the Kingdom of Prussia, and from 1871 it was also part of Germany, within which it was administratively part of the province of Pomerania. In the 1920s Lyonel Feininger often came to the village to paint and reside.

Following Germany's defeat in World War II in 1945, the area became again part of Poland in accordance to the Potsdam Conference. The first postwar Poland's Wedding to the Sea was performed in Mrzeżyno on 17 March 1945.

== Sports ==
The local football club is Orzeł Mrzeżyno. It competes in the lower leagues. It was the first club of Poland national football team player Grzegorz Krychowiak.

== Gallery ==
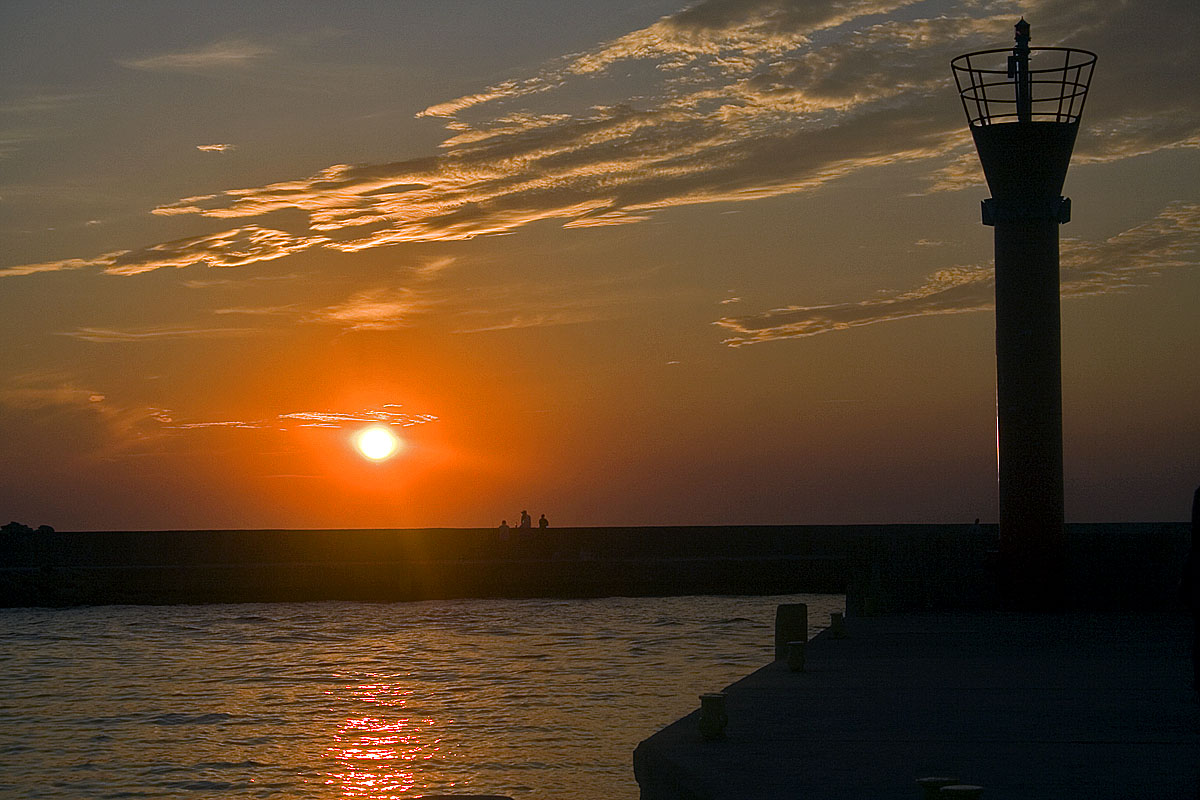
Sunset on estuary of the Rega river

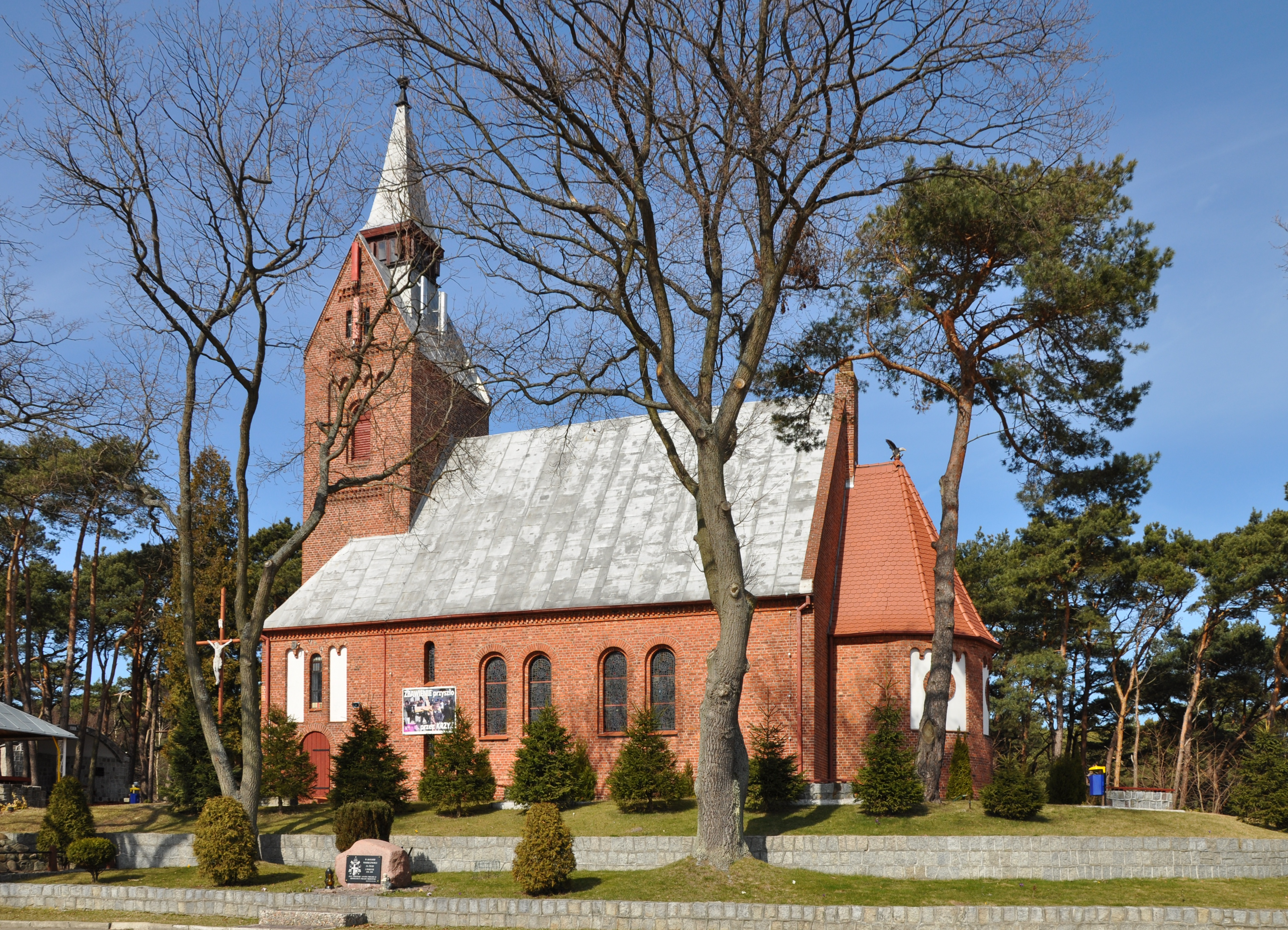
St. Peter and St. Paul Church

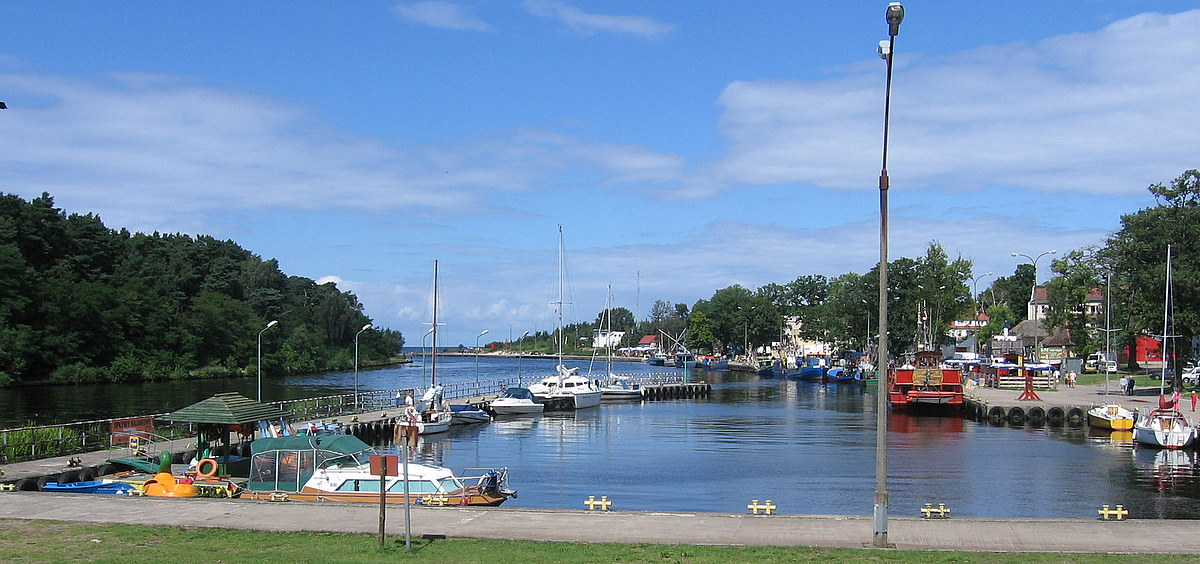
Marina in Mrzeżyno seaport

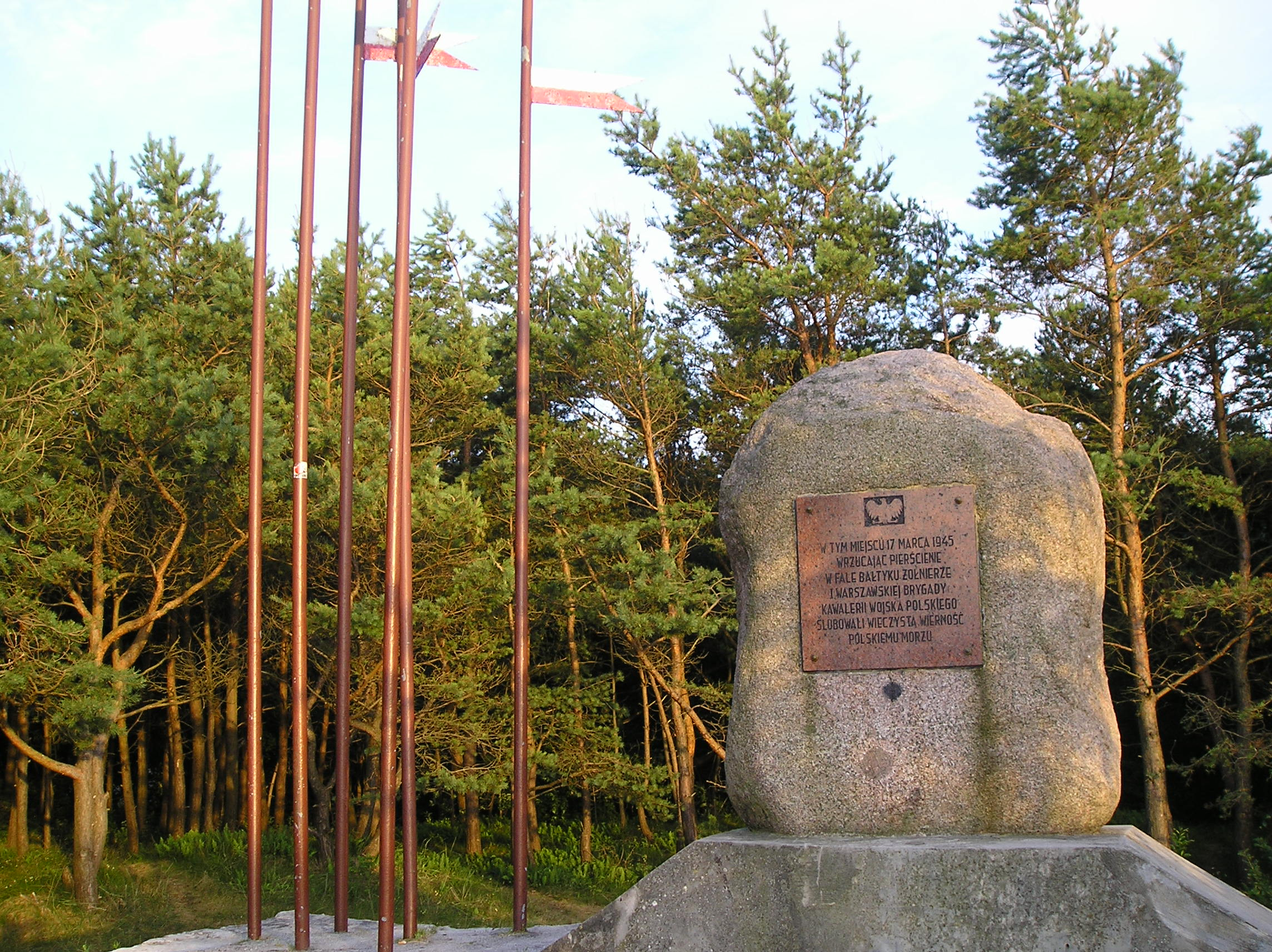
Poland's Wedding to the Sea monument
