= Conrad Pochhammer =

German physician and surgeon

Conrad Pochhammer (22 September 1873 – 25 March 1923) was a German physician and surgeon.
