= Gryfice =

Town in West Pomeranian Voivodeship, Poland

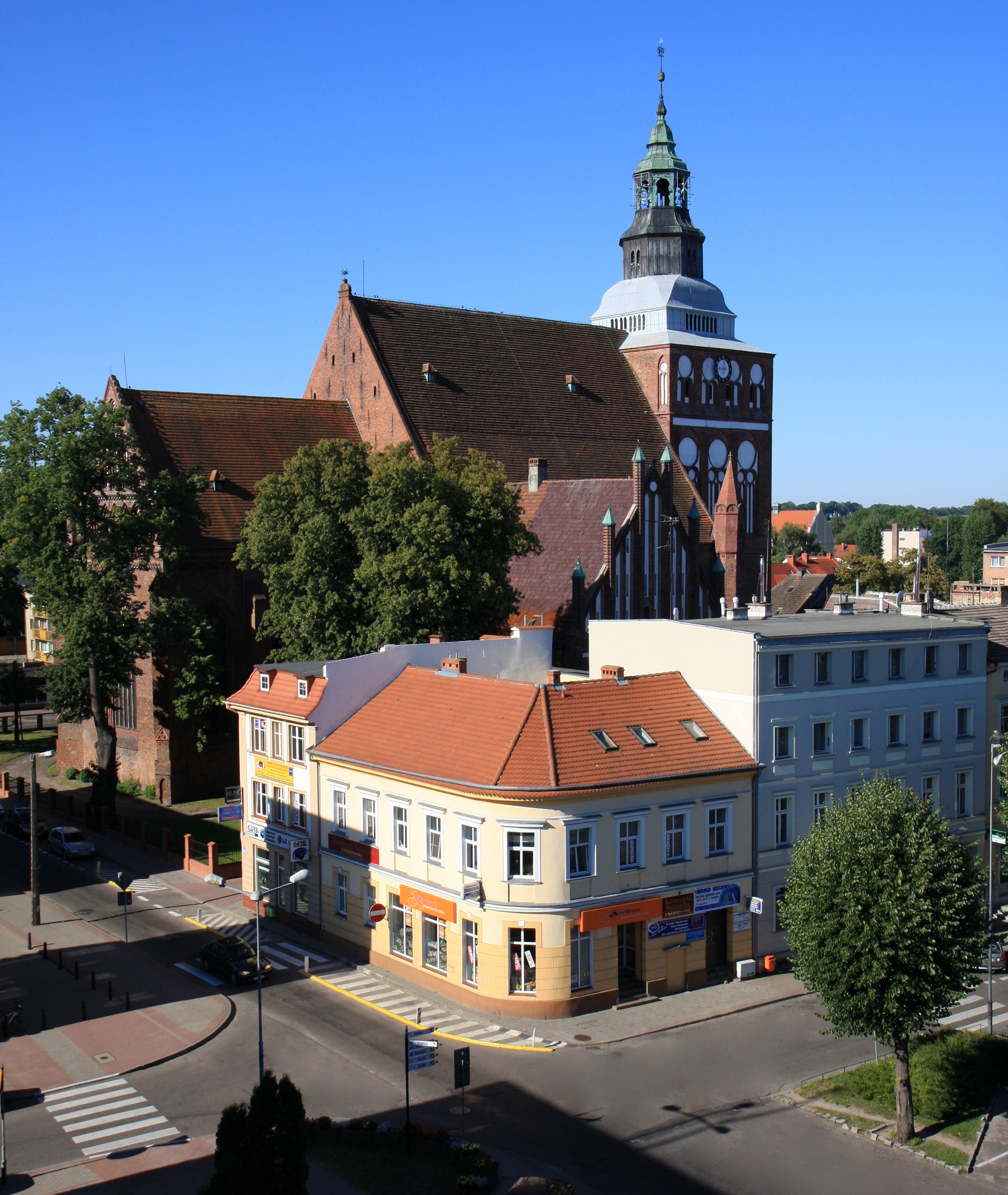
- Victory Square and Saint Mary's Church

- Flag Coat of arms

- Location within Poland
- Coordinates: 53°54′53″N 15°11′55″E
- Country: Poland
- Voivodeship: West Pomeranian
- County: Gryfice
- Gmina: Gryfice
- City rights: 1262

Government
  - Mayor: Tomasz Aniuksztys

Area
  - Total: 12.4 km^{2} (4.8 sq mi)

Population (2017)
  - Total: 16,600
  - Density: 1,340/km^{2} (3,470/sq mi)
- Time zone: UTC+1 (CET)
  - Summer (DST): UTC+2 (CEST)
- Postal code: 72-300
- Car plates: ZGY
- Website: http://www.urzad.gryfice.eu/

Gryfice (pronounced Gri-fitse [ɡrɨˈfʲit͡sɛ]; German: Greifenberg) is a historic town in Pomerania, north-western Poland, with 16,600 inhabitants (2017). It is the capital of Gryfice County in West Pomeranian Voivodeship. The town is situated approximately 22 kilometres from the Baltic Sea coast and seaside resorts.

== History ==
=== Middle Ages ===
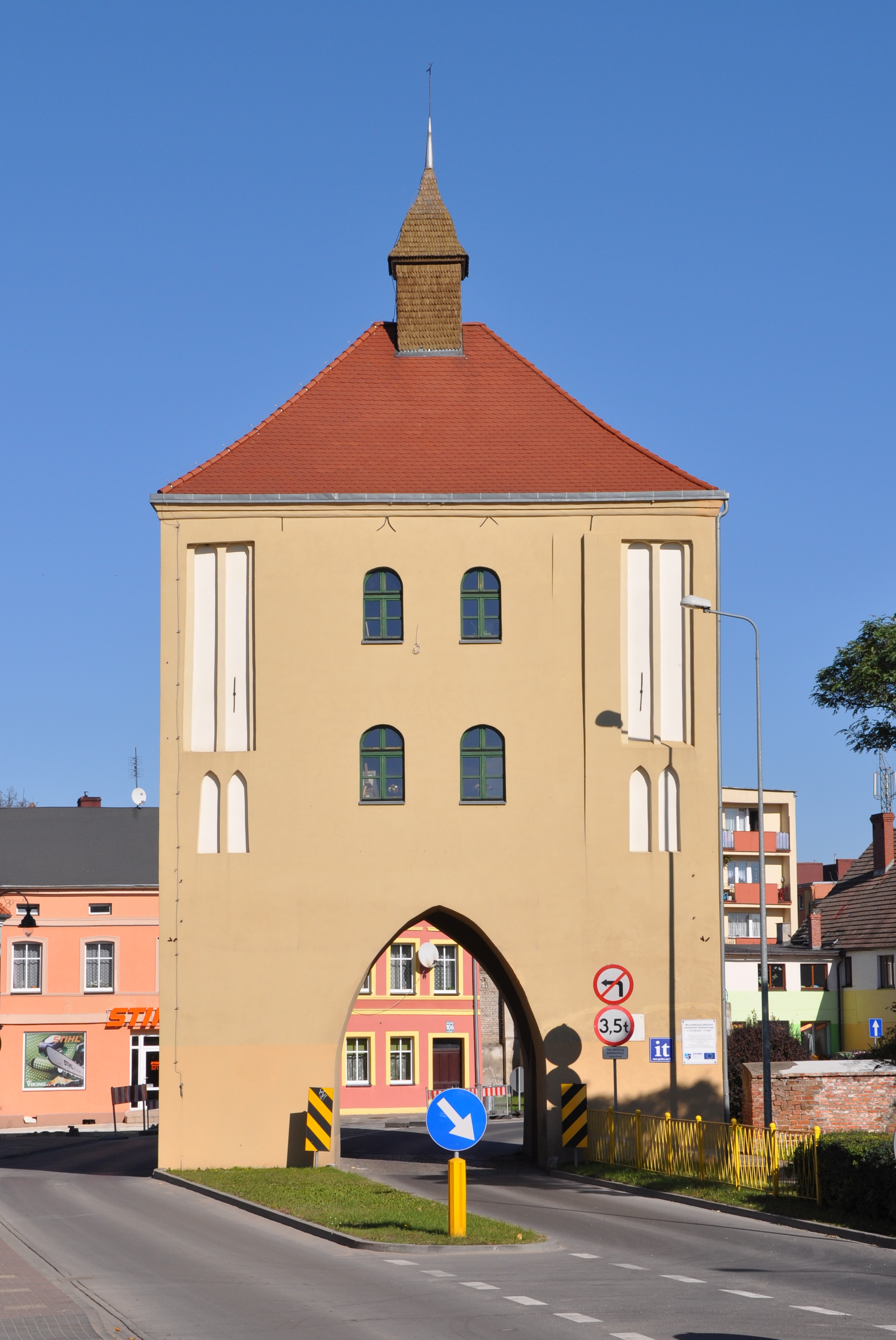
Wysoka Gate was once part of the medieval defensive walls which surrounded the town

The region was part of Poland during the reign of the first Polish ruler Mieszko I and during the early part of the reign of his successor, Bolesław I the Brave. It broke away along with most of Pomerania in the pagan revolt that occurred around 1005, but was reconquered by the Polish king in the early 1100s. The Battle of Niekładź took place in the area of Gryfice in 1121, in which Polish ruler Bolesław III Wrymouth defeated Wartislaw I, Duke of Pomerania and Swietopelk I, Duke of Pomerania. The area was part of the Duchy of Pomerania, a vassal state of Poland, which later on separated itself from Poland as a result of the fragmentation of Poland.

In 1262 Wartislaw III, Duke of Pomerania founded a town under Lübeck law on the Rega river to attract German settlers. After his death, his successor, Barnim I, Duke of Pomerania, named the settlement Civitat Griphemberch super Regam (Middle High German 'Griphemberch' meaning Griffin's mountain) after the coat of arms symbol of the Dukes of Pomerania. In 1365 the town entered the Hanseatic League and prospered due to the right of free navigation on the Rega, despite the 350-year conflict over rafting on the Rega river.

A town wall was built and at the end of the 13th century the construction of the St. Mary's church was begun. In a document of 1386 a Latin school is mentioned, which is generally called the oldest in Pomerania.

=== Modern era ===
In the 16th century, the local Germans pursued a policy of Germanisation towards the indigenous population, which, however, did not bring results quickly. At that time, some of the indigenous peasants fled to Poland, while Scottish immigrants settled in the town. As a result of the Thirty Years' War, the population of the town decreased dramatically. The town was occupied by the Imperial and Swedish armies. After the death of the last Pomeranian Duke and by the Treaty of Westphalia Greifenberg became part of Brandenburg-Prussia in 1648 and part of Imperial Germany in 1871. In 1818 the town became the capital of the Greifenberg district (Kreis Greifenberg).

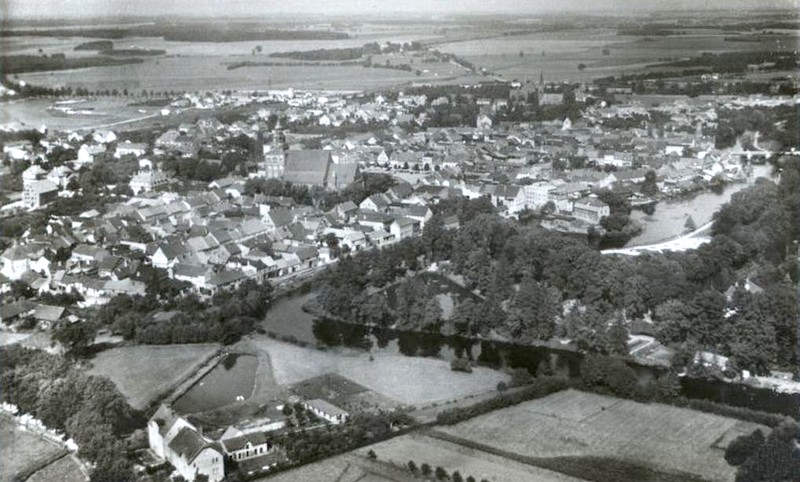
Panorama of the town in 1940

In 1894 the town was connected to the railway line Dąbie (Altdamm) - Kołobrzeg (Kolberg). On 1 July 1896 the Greifenberger Kleinbahn was opened, a narrow-gauge railway today used as a railway Museum. In 1933 a Polish association of agricultural workers was established in Gryfice. Local Poles and Jews were subjected to increased repressions, after the Nazis came to power in Germany in 1933. After the German invasion of Poland, forced labourers from Poland were brought to the town. During World War II, the Germans operated four forced labour subcamps of the Stalag II-D prisoner-of-war camp in the town.

At the end of World War II, on 5 March 1945, the Soviet Red Army conquered the town, and on March 8, Poles entered the town. Approximately 40 per cent of the town was destroyed, however many historical monuments stayed intact or were reconstructed. Following the post-war boundary changes, the town became part of Poland. Initially called Zagórze, it was eventually given the Polish name Gryfice. The Germans who did not escape during the battle with the Soviets, were expelled and the town was populated with Poles, some of them expellees themselves from Polish areas annexed by the Soviet Union. The post-war administration of Gryfice was created with the participation of the just-freed Polish forced labourers.

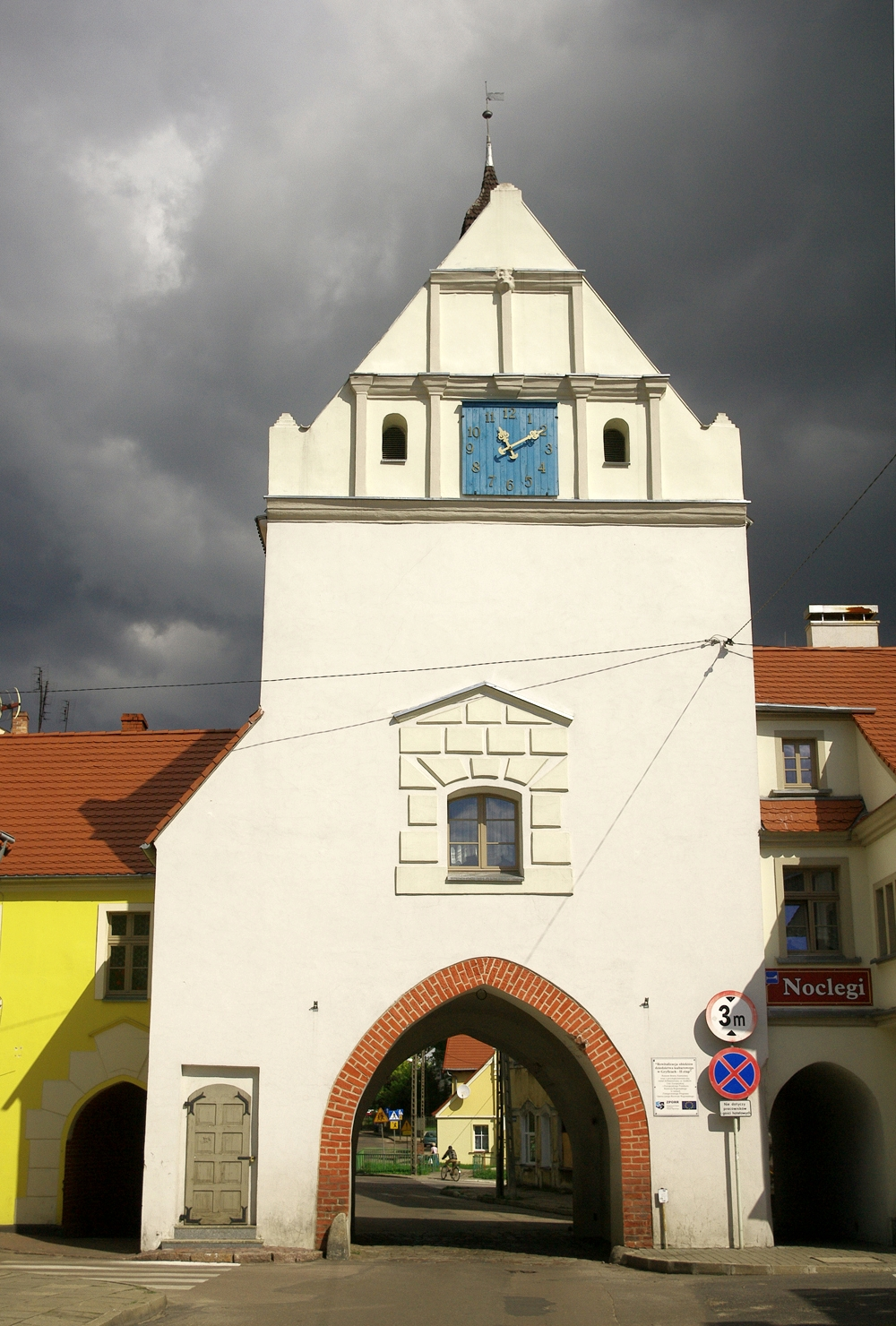
The medieval Stone Gate (Brama Kamienna)

After the war, the life of the town was being rebuilt. In 1945, the first post-war schools, a hospital and a cinema were opened and the following year a mill, a gasworks and a marmalade factory were opened. In 1948 a sugar factory was established, which already in 1951 was one of the leading sugar factories in Poland. From 1975 to 1998, it was administratively located in the Szczecin Voivodeship.

== Demographics ==
Between its foundation and 1945, Greifenberg was predominantly inhabited by German-speaking people. By the 18th century, almost all inhabitants where Lutheran Protestants, with small Jewish and Catholic minorities. With the expropriation and expulsion of the German inhabitants at the end of World War II and the occupation of the vacated buildings by Polish settlers, the majority of its population has been composed of Roman Catholics.

Historical population

| Year | Pop. | ±% |
|---|---|---|
| 1740 | 1,724 | — |
| 1782 | 1,890 | +9.6% |
| 1794 | 2,138 | +13.1% |
| 1812 | 2,445 | +14.4% |
| 1816 | 2,610 | +6.7% |
| 1831 | 3,272 | +25.4% |
| 1843 | 4,027 | +23.1% |
| 1852 | 4,886 | +21.3% |

| Year | Pop. | ±% |
|---|---|---|
| 1861 | 5,361 | +9.7% |
| 1871 | 5,619 | +4.8% |
| 1880 | 5,860 | +4.3% |
| 1890 | 5,293 | −9.7% |
| 1900 | 6,477 | +22.4% |
| 1910 | 7,769 | +19.9% |
| 1925 | 8,371 | +7.7% |
| 1939 | 10,817 | +29.2% |

| Year | Pop. | ±% |
|---|---|---|
| 1946 | 4,898 | −54.7% |
| 1950 | 8,737 | +78.4% |
| 1960 | 11,548 | +32.2% |
| 1970 | 13,200 | +14.3% |
| 1980 | 15,300 | +15.9% |
| 1990 | 17,600 | +15.0% |
| 2000 | 17,300 | −1.7% |

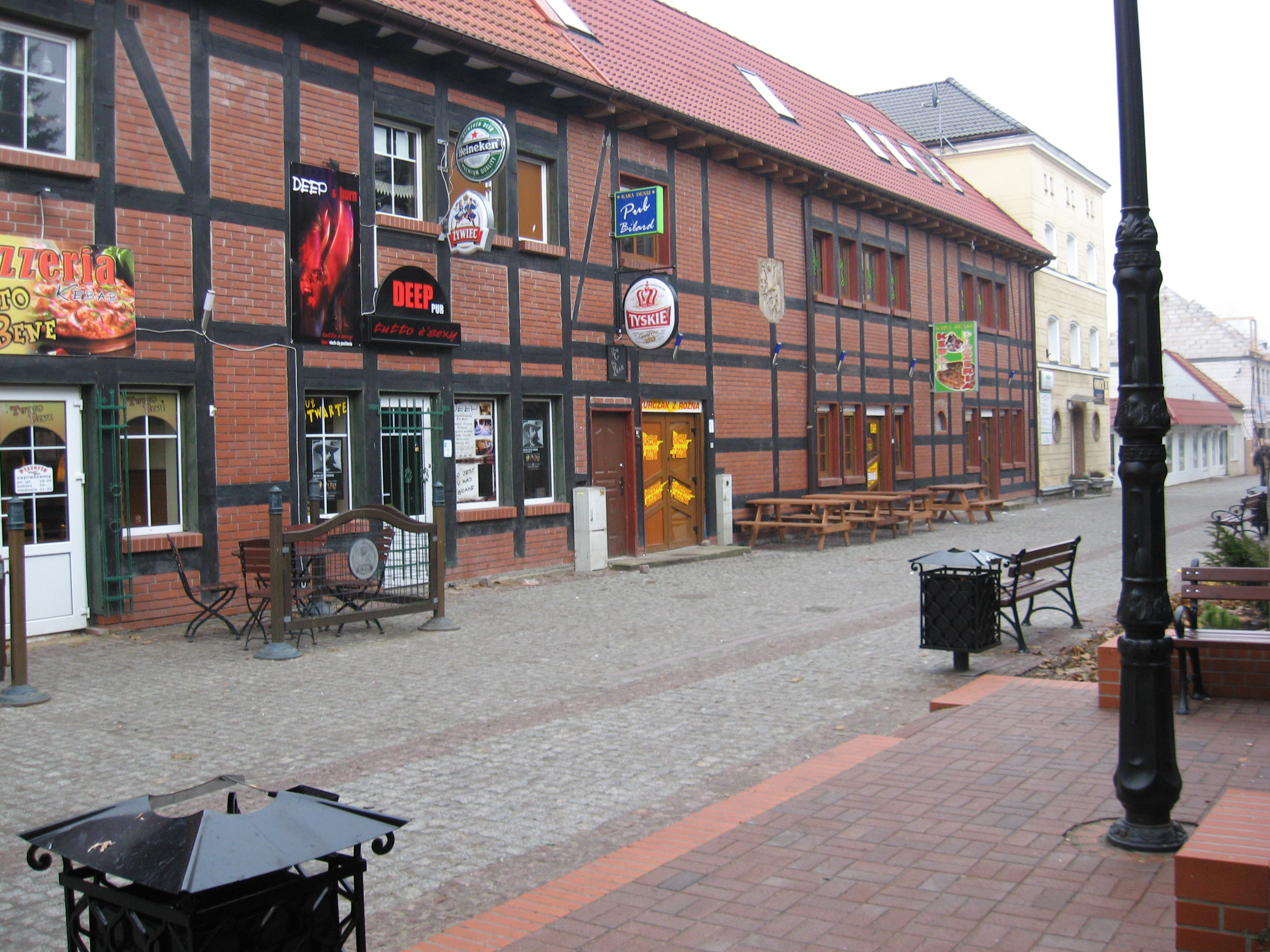
A pedestrian precinct along Ruta Street

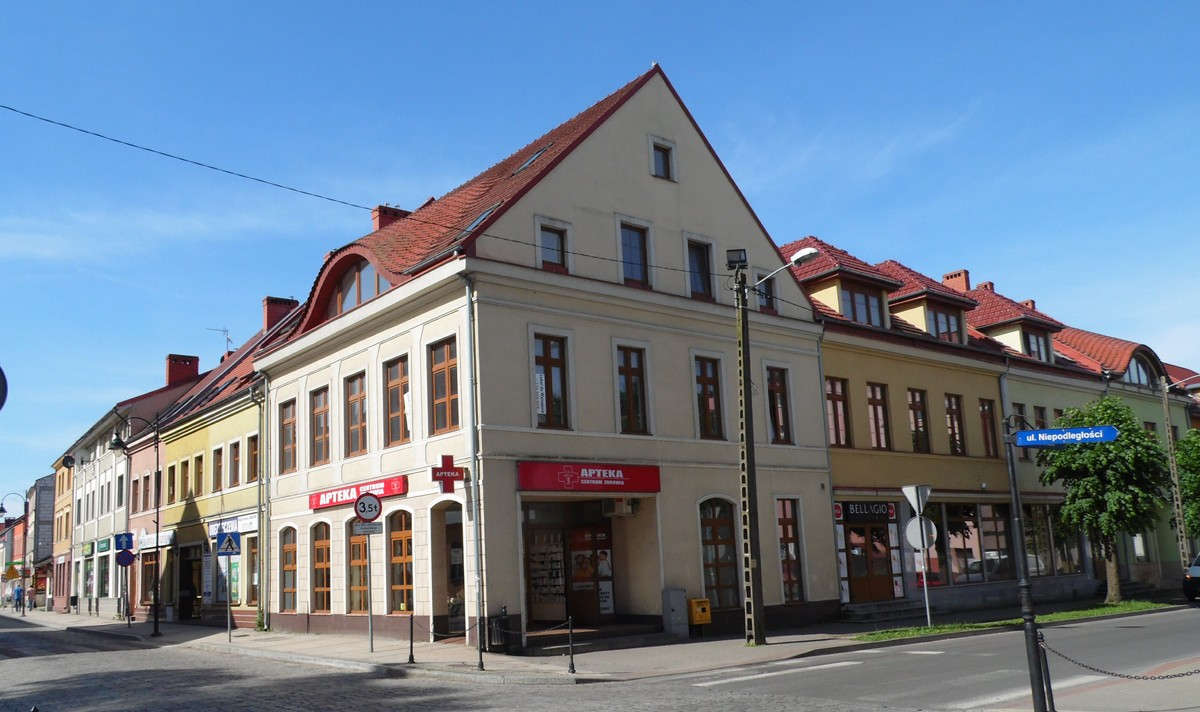
Historic tenement houses

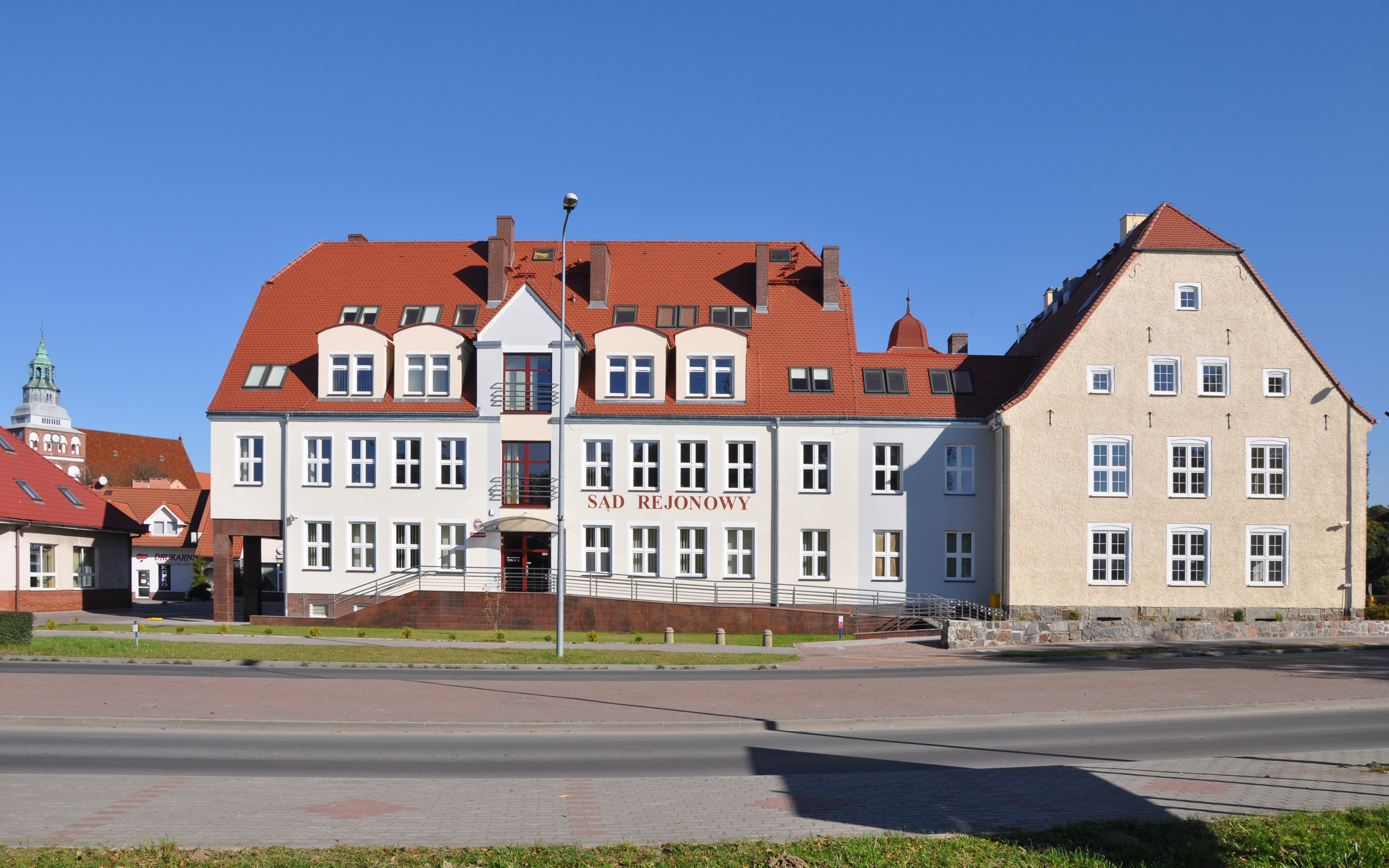
District Court in Gryfice

== Notable residents ==
- David Christiani (1610–1688), a German mathematician, philosopher and Lutheran theologian
- Karl Wilhelm Gottlob Kastner (1783–1857), a German chemist, natural scientist and a professor of physics and chemistry
- Gustav von Struensee (1803–1875) a German writer.
- Herman Schatz (1843–1906), an American politician and blacksmith emigrated to the US in 1851
- Friedrich Heinrich Albert Wangerin (1844–1933), a German mathematician.
- Richard C. H. Lenski (1864−1936), Lutheran scholar, emigrated to the US in 1872
- Conrad Pochhammer (1873–1932), a German physician and surgeon
- Rita von Gaudecker (1879–1968), a German author of books for children and young people
- Moritz Seeler (1896–1942), a German poet, writer, film producer and victim of the Holocaust.
- Ehrengard Schramm (1900–1985), a German politician and writer
- Krzysztof Linkowski (born 1949), a retired Polish runner who specialized in the 800 metres
- Artur Łącki (born 1961), a Polish politician and buisnessperon
- Bartosz Nowicki (born 1984) a Polish middle distance runner.
- Grzegorz Krychowiak (born 1990), a Polish professional football player.

== International relations ==
=== Twin towns — Sister cities ===
Gryfice is twinned with:

- Güstrow, Germany
- Meldorf, Germany
- Gryfów Śląski, Poland

== Literature ==
- Gustav Kratz: Die Städte der Provinz Pommern - Abriß ihrer Geschichte, zumeist nach Urkunden. Berlin 1865 (reprinted in 1996 by Sändig Reprint Verlag, Vaduz/Liechtenstein, ISBN 3-253-02734-1; reprinted in 2011 by Kessinger Publishing, U.S.A., ISBN 1-161-12969-3), pp. 32–38 (online).
