= Conflict over rafting on the Rega =

Trade dispute in Pomerania, 1317–1686

Conflict over rafting on the Rega was one of the trade disputes in Pomerania between Gryfice, Białoboki monastery and Trzebiatów, lasting from 1317 to 1686.

The privileges granted to the cities, including the staple rights for Trzebiatów and indirect participation in the Hanseatic League, caused a more than 350-year-long conflict over the free rafting on the Rega river. The subject of the conflict included Gryfice's revenues from fishing, as well as river and sea trade. In the 14th century, Gryfice had a dispute with the Norbertine monastery, and from the 15th century, armed conflict with Trzebiatów. Gryfice's location on the Rega river and the entrepreneurship of Gryfice fishermen and merchants aroused jealousy from other centers, including Trzebiatów. Despite the positive resolution of the dispute in favor of Gryfice, Trzebiatów undertook actions to hinder the free rafting on the Rega. The dispute ended in the first half of the 18th century when the riverbed became silted, the water level decreased, and the Rega itself became unnavigable.

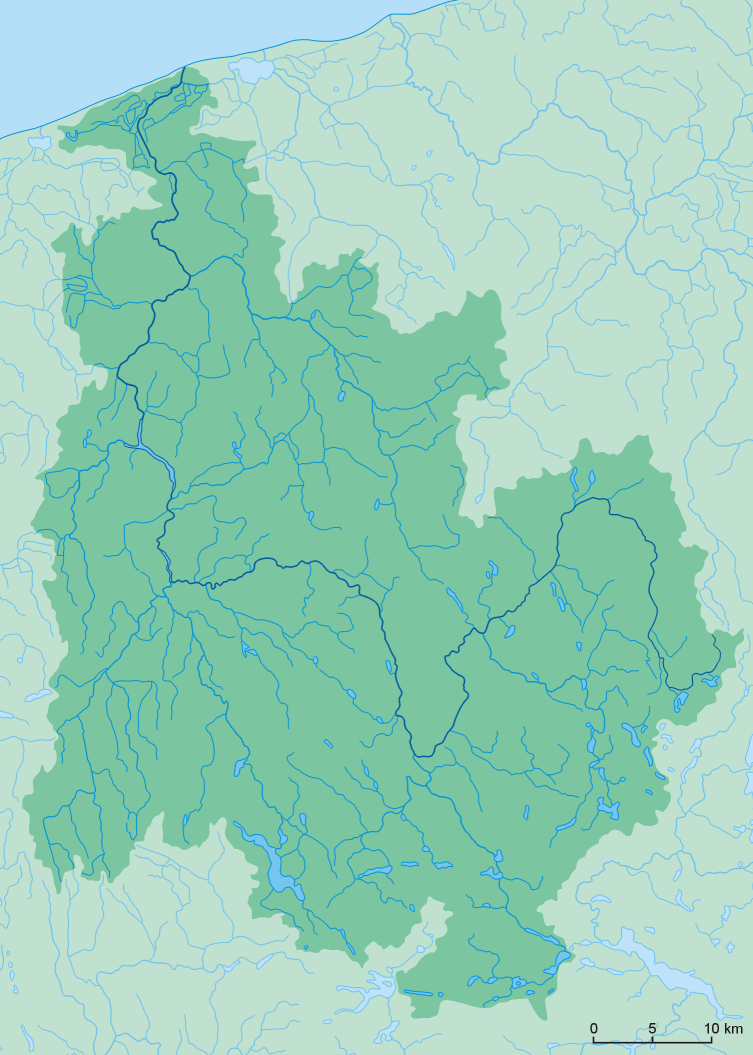
Rega with its basin

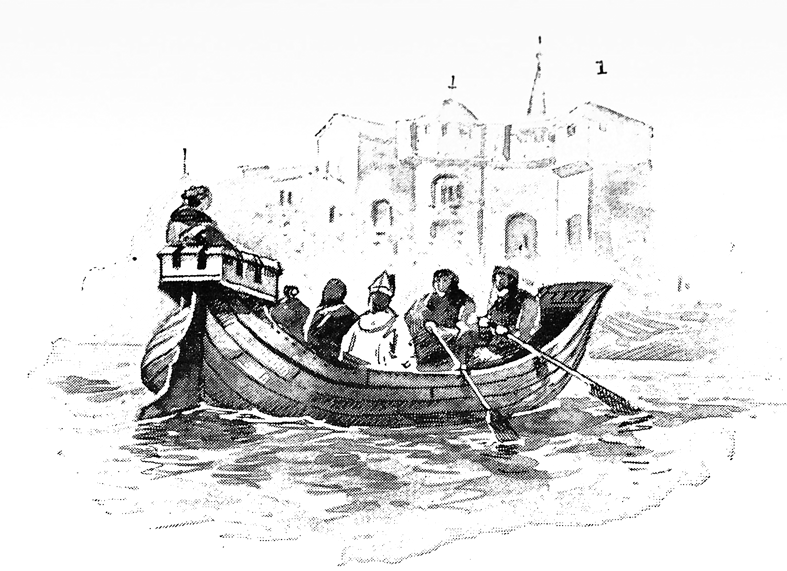
Fishing and trading boats

== Grounds for conflict ==
=== Privileges ===
Thanks to the privileges obtained when Gryfice was granted town rights in 1262, and their confirmation in 1264, fishermen could freely conduct fishing, and merchants engaged in river and maritime trade. Access to the sea contributed to the development of the city and its connections with coastal towns. Trzebiatów, situated to the north (closer to the river's mouth to the sea), received similar privileges in 1287, as well as staple rights in 1303. In 1306, Duke Bogislaw IV granted customs freedom during navigation on the Rega river and within a mile from the shore to the Białoboki Norbertine monastery and to the residents of the monastery's port of Regoujście within the sea area. In the same year, Trzebiatów bought from Bogusław IV the right to collect tariffs in the port of Regoujście for 150 marks.

In 1309, Trzebiatów obtained the right to fish in the Baltic Sea. In 1322, Wartislaw IV issued a privilege for Trzebiatów to control the port of Regoujście. Thanks to this privilege, the townspeople of Trzebiatów and merchants (including those from other locations) could issue lists for the export of goods and other products. The issuing of export lists was the responsibility of the Trzebiatów municipal council. Merchants considered the fees collected to be too high and lodged numerous complaints.

=== Membership in the Hanseatic League ===
The development of trade in both cities began after their accession to the Hanseatic League in the second half of the 14th century. As indicated by medievalists, membership in the league was of an intermediate nature. G. Kratz, J. Mitkowski, and P. Żak pointed out that Gryfice and Trzebiatów were not direct members of the Hanseatic League, but were subject to the port city of Kołobrzeg, which represented the interests of both cities. Among the Pomeranian cities, only 6 were direct members and 14 were indirect members of the league. The membership of Gryfice and Trzebiatów in the Hanseatic League was subject to the same conditions as other full-fledged members. Merchants organized the purchase of agricultural products, including grain, wax, hides, tar, hemp, meat, and honey. Goods were exported to many coastal cities, including Lübeck. This was made possible by a privilege issued by Wartislaw IX and Barnim VII in 1436 for the Dutch, who became significant partners in the grain trade.

== Gryfice's dispute with the monastery in Białoboki ==
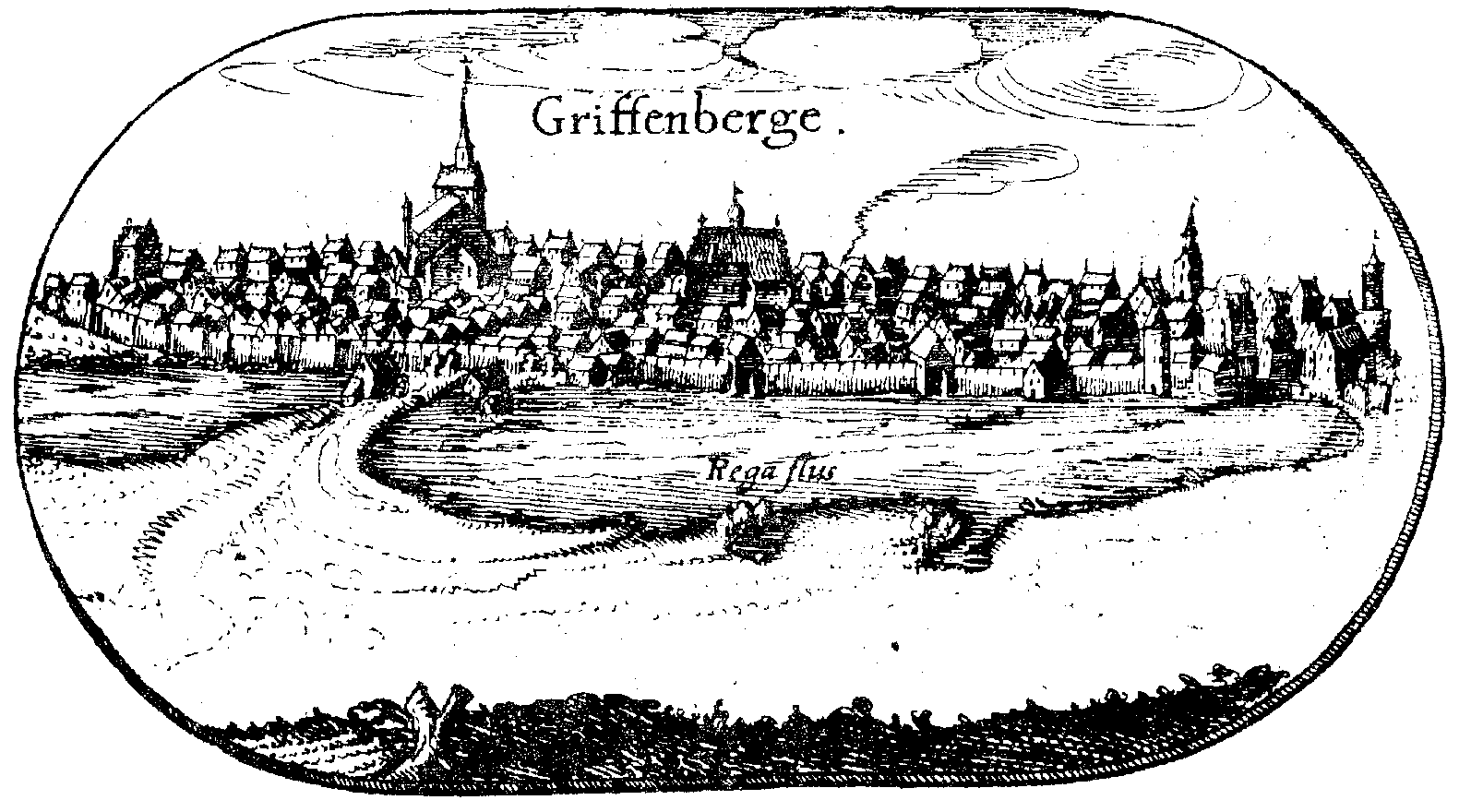
Gryfice – panoramic view of the city according to Johann Wolfart on the Great Map of the Duchy of Pomerania by Lubinus (1618)

=== Norbertines against the law ===
In 1317, the monks from the Białoboki monastery caused a long-standing dispute with Gryfice over free rafting on the river. The monastery's abbot ordered the damming of the river and the removal of fish weirs at its mouth. The altered course of the Rega and the driven stakes made navigation on the river impossible. Additionally, fishermen had their buildings, nets, and auxiliary equipment requisitioned. They were also required to pay a toll based on a portion of their sea catch. The obstacles were met with resistance from the people of Gryfice – the city was unwilling to submit to the monks. The lack of more comprehensive source data from the years 1317–1325 prevents a more detailed understanding of the background of the conflict.

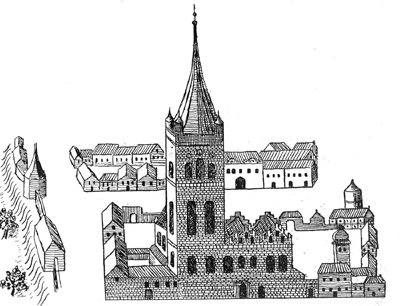
The now defunct St. Mary's Church in Szczecin

=== Process ===
The people of Gryfice lodged a complaint with Pope John XXII, which led to a trial at the St. Mary's Church in Stettin (1326–1328). Gryfice was represented by the city councilor Herman from Łobez, while Białoboki was represented by Canon Herman from Greifswald, the monastery's prosecutor. The process began with an official protest from the monastery's prosecutor and an accusation against the Gryfice municipal council for unlawful and criminal acts. In front of the gathered assembly, the Białoboki prosecutor simultaneously cast a curse on the plaintiffs, declaring them excluded from the Christian community. The trial ended in victory for the people of Gryfice on 28 January 1328. The abbot did not accept the defeat and appealed to the papal court. On 7 May 1328, the claims of the people of Gryfice were once again recognized, while the Norbertines were ordered to remove the devices blocking navigation on the river and to pay compensation of 5000 silver marks.

=== Agreement ===
The Norbertines did not comply with the decisions of the papal court. It was only the occupation of their property that led to their surrender and execution in 1330. The barriers on the river were removed, and compensation of 1500 silver marks was paid to Gryfice. On 8 September 1331, the judgment of the court and the agreement with the monastery were read out in the Gryfice town hall. In 1337, the abbey transferred the village of Górzyca to the parish church in Gryfice.

== Conflict between Gryfice and Trzebiatów ==
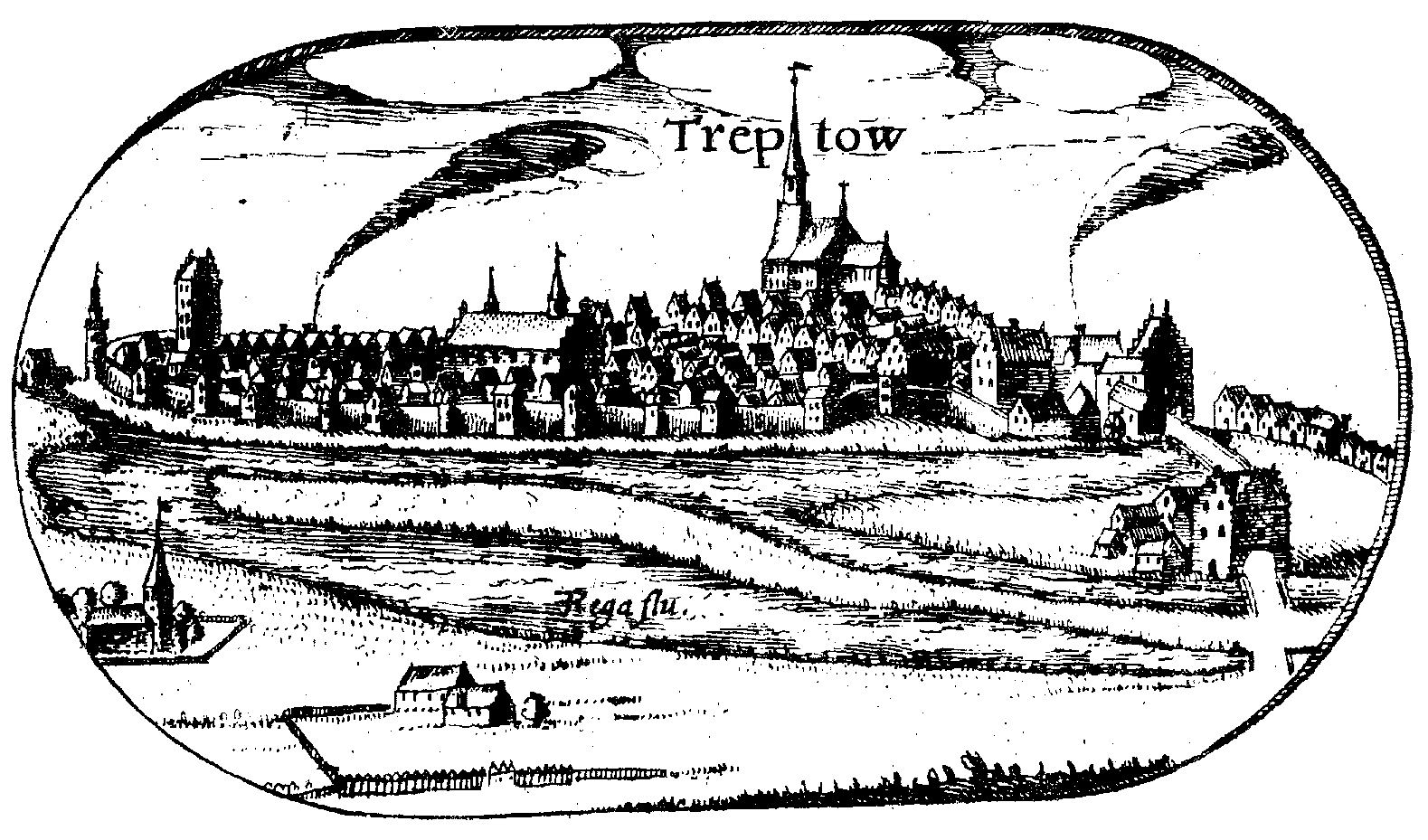
Trzebiatów – panorama of the city according to Johann Wolfart on the Great Map of the Duchy of Pomerania (1618)

=== The origin of the dispute ===
In the 15th century, there were several disputes with Trzebiatów, located north of Gryfice, which attempted to levy customs duties on Gryfice ships traversing the Rega river. The conflict stemmed from the limitation of Gryfice's revenues and the subordination of the city to the staple rights. Trzebiatów derived huge profits from a privilege granted in 1436 for the Dutch, who became their customers in the grain trade.

In 1449, under the pretext of disrupting the operation of watermills, Trzebiatów attempted to block the river for all ships coming from the south, leading to an escalation of the conflict. Poles were driven into the riverbed, and the banks were fortified with an earthen embankment, narrowing its channel significantly. Gryfice appealed to Duchess Maria and Eric I, who co-governed the Duchy of Słupsk with her.

=== Court proceedings ===
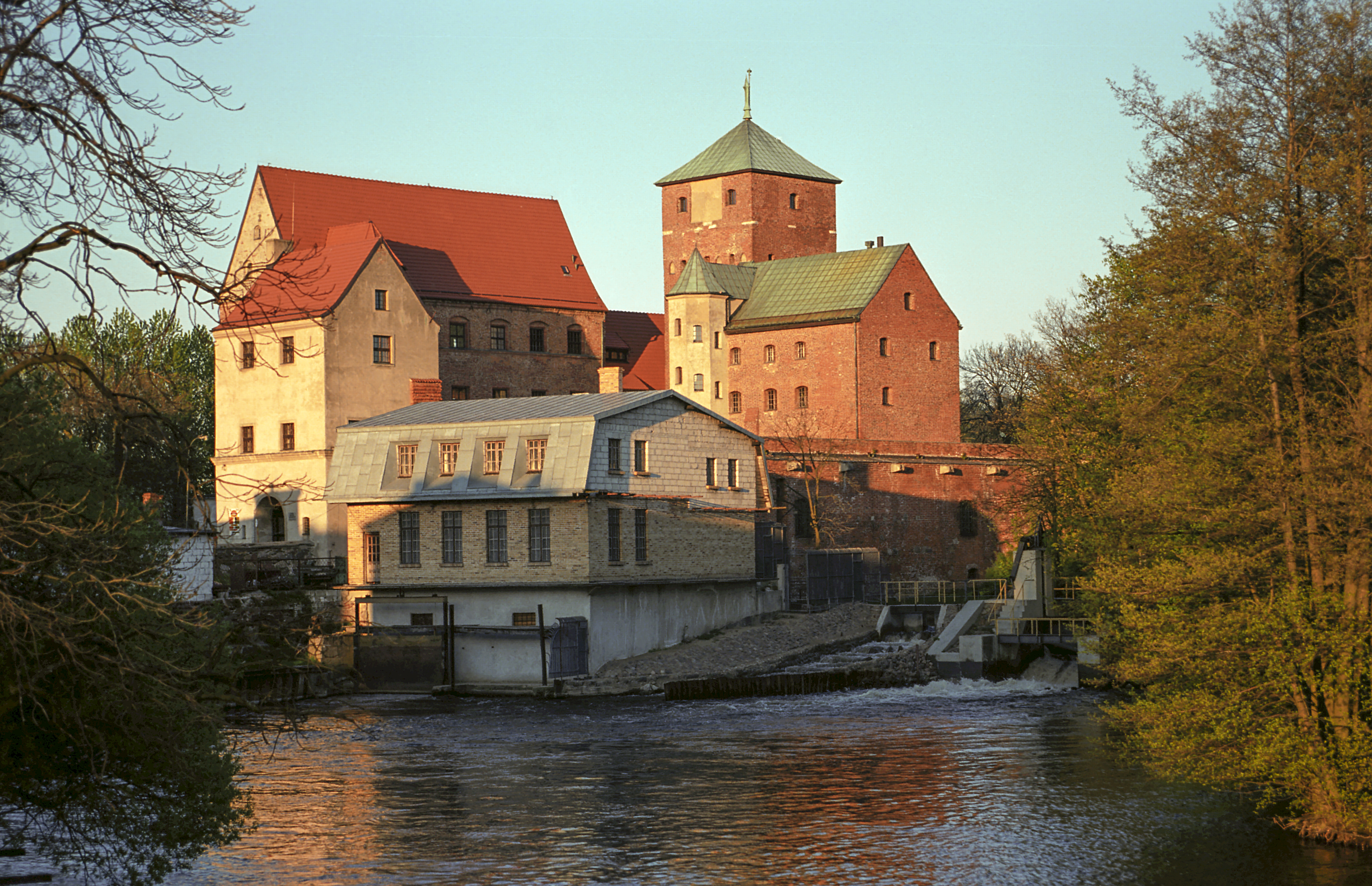
Castle in Darłowo

The conflict was resolved during a trial in Darłowo in 1449. The verdict was approved by the princely court and the legal faculty of the University of Greifswald. Gryfice were to receive compensation of 100,000 Rhenish florins.

A complaint was lodged with the papal chancellery by the municipal council of Trzebiatów in 1450 (the so-called case in the second instance). Pope Nicholas V ordered his representatives to review the submitted documents and investigate the causes of the conflict. The papal court sided with the aggrieved Gryfice residents and reaffirmed the earlier princely judgment. The people of Trzebiatów, along with the abbot of Białoboki (supporting the city's actions), did not accept either judgment. Efforts by Eric I, the Duke of Słupsk, to enforce the judgments were unsuccessful.

=== Armed expeditions ===
For reasons that remain unclear, the papal verdict was changed in favor of Trzebiatów. Thus, the previous verdict was overturned. The people of Gryfice did not accept the papal ruling and launched an expedition against the complainants. Local knights also participated in the expedition, which ended in victory. Gryfice mercenaries managed to retrieve the sums owed to them. The city and surrounding agricultural estates were plundered, and all livestock herds were abducted. A subsequent armed retaliation by the people of Trzebiatów did not lead to the recognition of the papal verdict. The fighting between the cities continued. Mutual raids on merchant caravans, imposing tribute, and plundering nearby villages led to the ruin of both urban centers. In 1453, Duke Eric brokered an end to the conflict between the warring parties. He sided with Gryfice and confirmed their right to free rafting on the Rega river, while also guaranteeing their rights in the event of any division of the country.

As a consequence of Duke Eric's actions, an agreement was reached between Trzebiatów and the Białoboki monastery. In 1457, with the cooperation of the monks, the people of Trzebiatów dug a new, shortened stream bed of the Rega river (bypassing Resko Przymorskie lake) in the area of present-day Mrzeżyno and established a new port there.

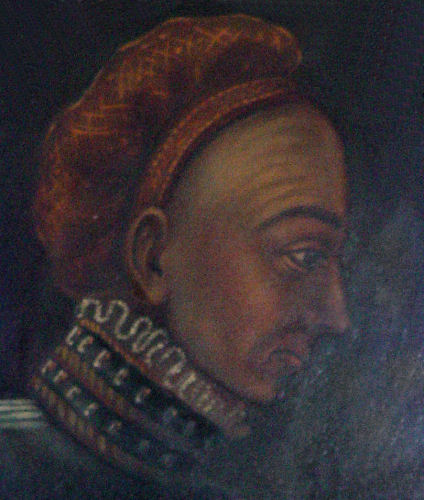
Duke Bogislaw X

=== The end of a 40-year dispute ===
In the following years, disputes between the cities resurfaced. The situation was mediated by Bogislaw X, who in the early years of his reign ended the forty-year period of conflict between the two cities along the lower Rega river (23 October 1488). Gryfice regained the right to free rafting (confirmed in 1459). The river was unblocked, and the right to construct a new port building for storing equipment and goods was reinstated. In return, the people of Gryfice were obligated to provide 25 carts for two days a year for the maintenance and repair of port facilities, while Trzebiatów was to rebuild the water locks to ensure unhindered navigation.

=== Further disputes ===
In 1538 and 1554, there were renewed disputes with Trzebiatów. They were caused by Gryfice's failure to deliver underwater parts for the renovation of breakwaters and the construction of ships that were too large compared to the capacity of the locks. The conflict ended in 1589.

The revival of Polish trade and cooperation with ports in Kołobrzeg, Darłowo, and indirectly with Trzebiatów and Gryfice, led to the economic growth of both cities during the Second Northern War, also known as the Swedish Deluge (1655–1660). A short-lived dispute arose between the cities, which ended in Gryfice's favor. The agreement included duty-free transport of goods along the Rega river to the port at its mouth. In 1656, the people of Trzebiatów designated a unloading area in Kątkowo. The people of Gryfice built a grain granary and warehouses there. However, the agreement stipulated that the rights of Gryfice merchants could not apply to foreign counterparties.

In 1686, Gryfice's last conflict with Trzebiatów occurred. The dispute concerned the transport of wood along the Rega river. The matter was settled through mutual negotiations. The cities did not appeal to higher secular and ecclesiastical authorities. In the first half of the 18th century, due to the silting of the riverbed and the lowering of the water level, river rafting ceased. Thus, both cities began to slowly lose their significance in river and maritime trade.

== See also ==
- War of Szczecin against Stargard over maritime trade

== Bibliography ==
- Baranowska, Olga Anna (2001). Pomorze Zachodnie – moja mała ojczyzna [Western Pomerania – my little homeland] (in Polish). Szczecin, Poland: INES. ISBN 83-910427-4-X.
- Rzeszowski, S. (1971). "Z dziejów Gryfic". In Białecki, Tadeusz (ed.). Ziemia Gryficka 1969. Szczecin.
- Grzenda, M. "Trzebiatów – historia miejscowości" (in Polish).
- Kratz, G. (1865). Die Städte des Provinz Pommern (in German). Berlin.
- Lachnitt, W. (1947). Pod znakiem Gryfa. Szczecin.
- Mitkowski, J. (1946). Pomorze Zachodnie w stosunku do Polski. Poznań.
- Riemann, Hermann (1862). Geschichte der Stadt Greifenberg in Pommern (in German). Greifenberg/Pommern.
- Rymar, Edward (2007). "Itinerarium książąt zachodniopomorskich Bogusława IV (1278-1309) i Warcisława IV (1309-1326)". Przegląd Zachodniopomorski (2). Szczecin.
- Rzetelska-Feleszko, E. (1986). Pomorze Zachodnie. Warsaw. ISBN 83-01-06462-5.
- Ślaski, Kazimierz (1954). Przemiany etniczne na Pomorzu Zachodnim w rozwoju dziejowym. Seria: Prace Instytutu Zachodniego. Poznań.
- Żak, P. (2001). "Złoty wiek Trzebiatowa. Pozycja społeczna, gospodarcza i polityczna miasta w dawnym Księstwie Pomorskim podczas rozdrobnienia feudalnego". In Łysiak, W. (ed.). Trzebiatów – historia i kultura : materiały z konferencji, Trzebiatów, 17-18 maja 2001. Poznań. ISBN 83-87437-08-5.
