= St. Mary's Church, Gryfice =

Parish church in Gryfice, Poland

Coordinates: 53°54′49″N 15°11′54″E

St. Mary's Church
- Kościół pw. Wniebowzięcia Najświętszej Maryi Panny w Gryficach
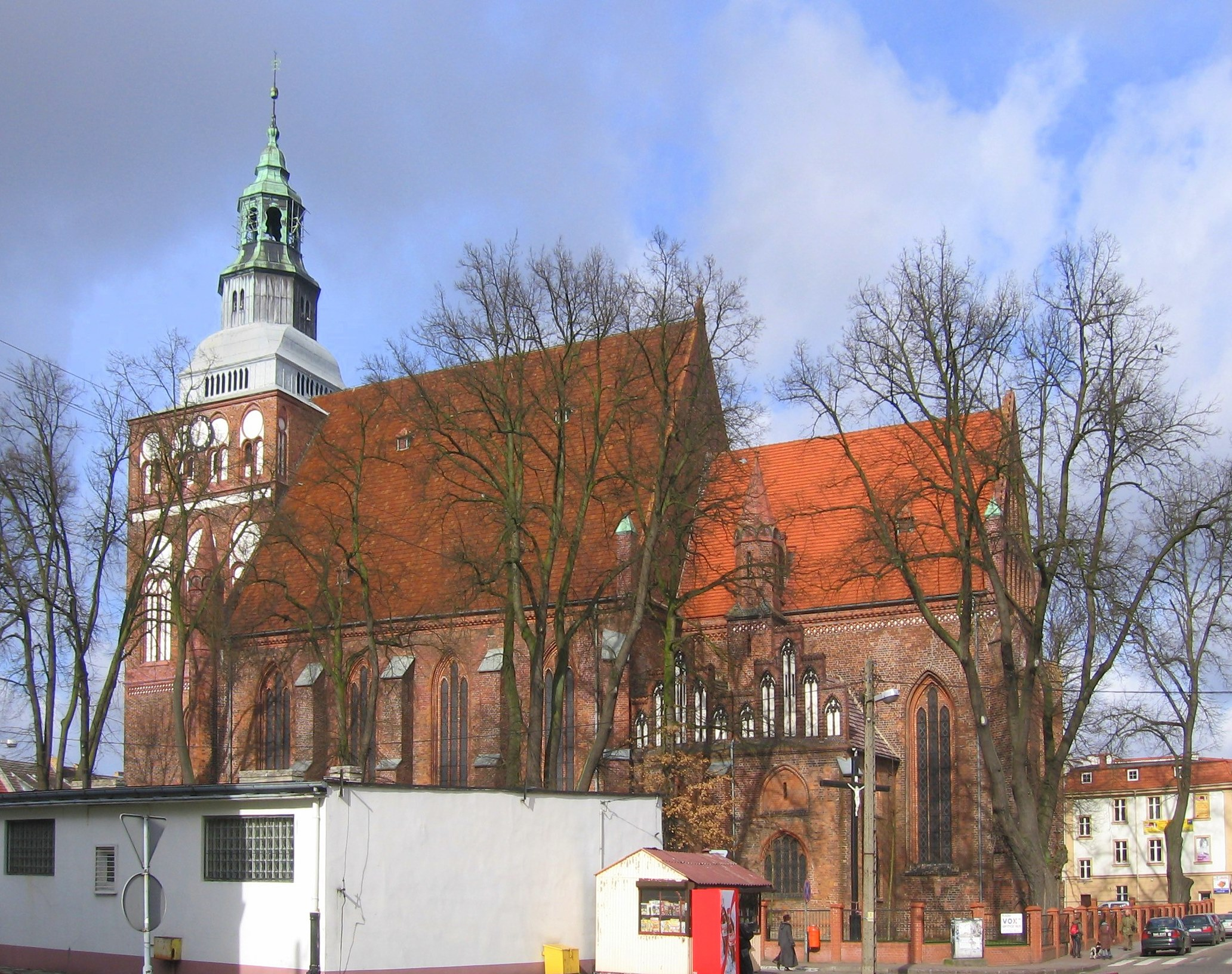
- St. Mary's Church
- Location: Gryfice
- Address: Niepodległości Street
- Country: Poland
- Denomination: Catholic
- Churchmanship: Latin

History
- Status: Church
- Dedication: Assumption of Mary
- Dedicated: 1498

Architecture
- Style: Brick Gothic
- Completed: 1498
- Demolished: March 31, 1658

Specifications
- Length: 61.95 m (203.2 ft)
- Width: 25.75 m (84.5 ft)
- Height: 51.5 m (169 ft)
- Materials: brick

Administration
- Parish: Parish of the Assumption of the Blessed Virgin Mary in Gryfice

The St. Mary's Church (Polish: Kościół Mariacki, German: St. Marienkirche), or formally, Church of the Assumption of the Blessed Virgin Mary in Gryfice, is a parish church, one of the religious buildings in the city, built from the turn of the 13th and 14th centuries to the end of the 15th century.

It is a Gothic sacred building with a polygonal plan and rib and lierne vaults, which was rebuilt (from 1659 to 1668), expanded, and renovated (17th and 19th centuries) over the centuries. Apart from the chancel, the nave, and the tower, it had two additional chapels dedicated to the Virgin Mary (now: sacristy) and St. Mary. The church was dedicated in 1498. The sacred object covers an area of 1,108 m^{2} and a volume of 15,905 m^{3} (according to other sources: 1,115 m^{2} and 38,660 m^{3}). On the external elevations, there are metope friezes, mascarons, buttresses adorned with a cross and lily, as well as traceries, which are rare in the architectural decoration of sacred buildings in Western Pomerania. The church has historical furnishings, including a Romanesque baptismal font from the 13th century, a late Gothic triptych from the end of the 15th century, a Baroque main altar, and eighteenth-century pulpit, pipe organs, choir stalls, numerous tombstones, and epitaphs.

== Location ==
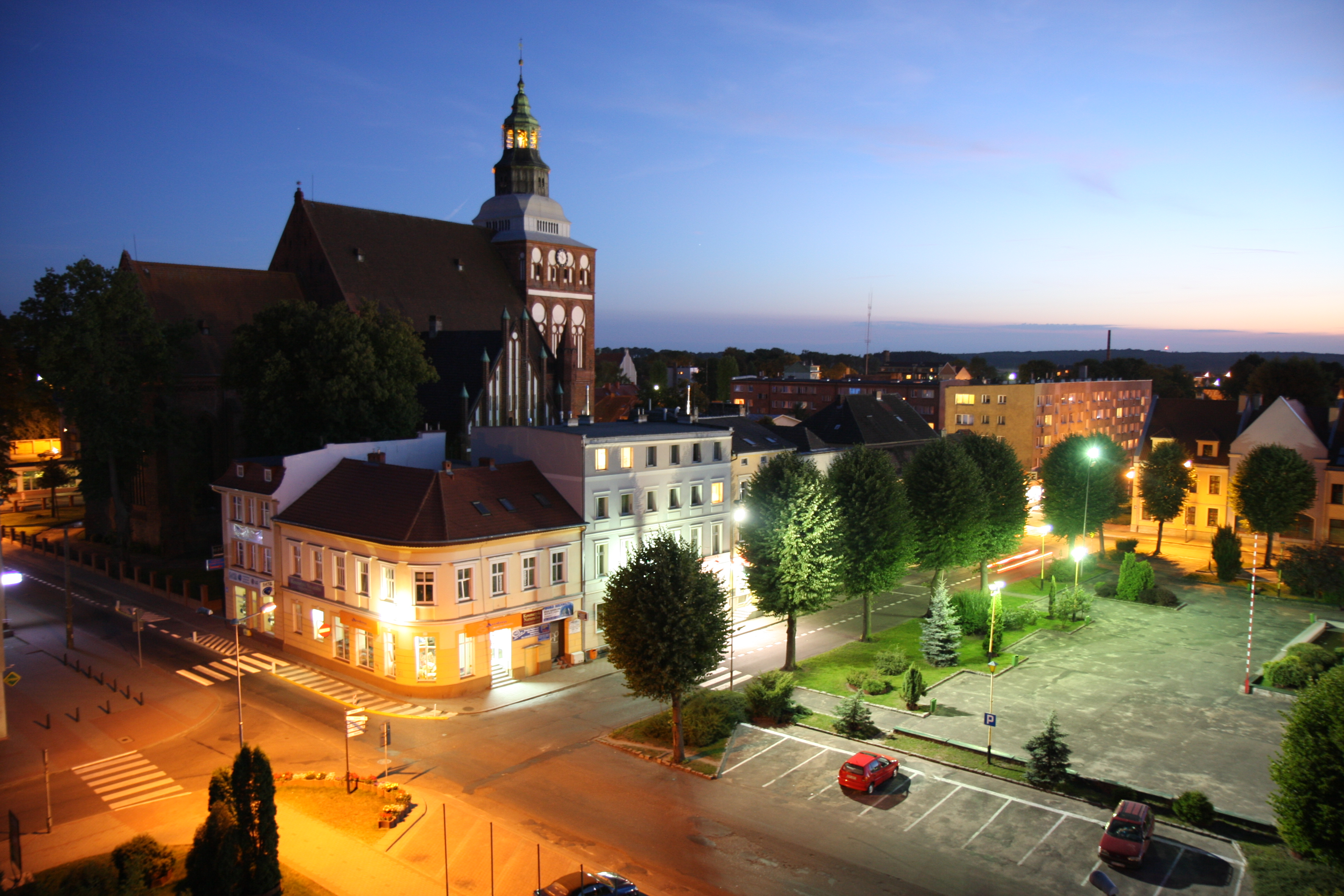
View of St. Mary's Church at sunset (2008)

The parish church is located in the central part of the Old Town, south of Victory Square and separated by the southern row. Its roof faces Kościelna Street. It is situated in the so-called market block from its southern side, at the corner of Niepodległości Street, Kościelna Street, and Wojska Polskiego Street.

The main portal of the church is located on Niepodległości Street, in the western facade of the church tower. Side entrances are located on the southern wall of the nave.

== History ==
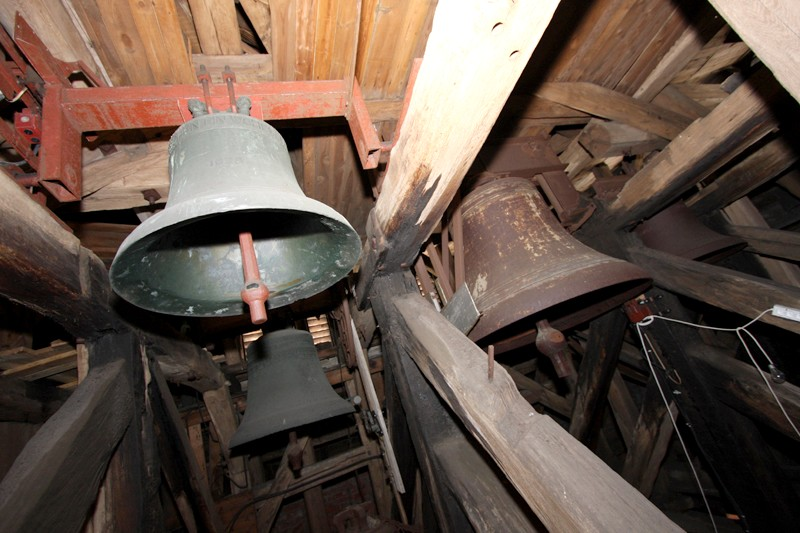
Bells of St. Mary's church

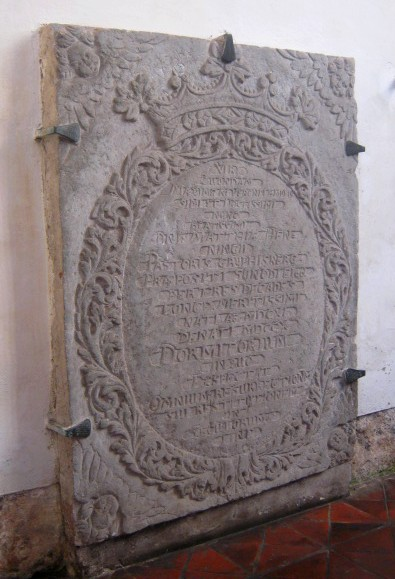
18th century epitaph in the porch of the church

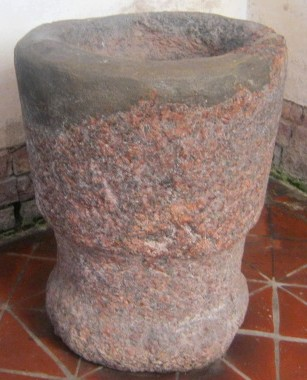
Romanesque baptismal font

The construction of the St. Mary's Church in Gryfice dates back to the turn of the 13th and 14th centuries. The exact start date of the construction of the parish church is not known. Under the date of 1297, there is a written mention of the parson Ludevinus, indicating that the construction of the building was advanced and partially fulfilling its function. The cornerstone was probably laid a few years later, although there are indications that the current church was built on the site of the former wooden one. This is associated with the granting of city rights in 1262 and the construction of the town on the left bank of the Rega river.

Initially, the eastern part of the church was built (now the chancel), along with the St. Mary's Chapel, which served as a church treasury until 1534 (now the sacristy). Part of this construction was completed in the early 14th century. The nave, the central part of the current church, was built according to different architectural concepts between 1300 and 1350. Various span walls were used in the construction, with the southern one wider than the northern one. Different profiled jambs were also used. Some scholars suggest that the nave was the first part of the building to be constructed. They base this on a continuous frieze (called metope) with a floral or vine motif, which is the only one of its kind on the church. The rest of the building is filled with friezes with "blind" tracery.

Several decades later, the church tower was built, probably in the early 15th century. Originally, it was built on a granite foundation, with the upper parts made of brick and the top made of wood. It had a gable roof with a slender pointed spire. The current appearance of the tower's facade and its crowning is the result of later reconstructions after fires in 1496, 1562, 1568, and 1658. The final stage of expansion was the construction of the St. Mary's Chapel (German: Kapelle der Maria), located on the northern facade of the nave. Its completion in 1498 marked the end of the temple's construction. In the same year, the church was dedicated by Bishop Martin von Karith.

Until 13 December 1534, the church belonged to the Latin Church, and then, as a result of the Reformation, it was taken over by the Lutheran Church. This led to significant neglect of the building, managed by the deacons of that time. Restoration work began in the early 17th century when the library was arranged anew, the organs were repaired, and the tower's crowning was renovated.

On 31 March 1658, a fire destroyed the southern, western, and central parts of the city, including the church, from which only partially load-bearing walls and pillars remained. St. Mary's Chapel survived the fire. Between 1659 and 1668, the reconstruction of the church took place. Load-bearing walls were rebuilt, and the upper parts of the charred pillars were restored. In 1663, the reconstruction of the church tower, which had collapsed, began. A year later, three new cast bells were consecrated and hung, along with an additional one, which was moved from the Stone Gate. In 1667, the interior of the church was restored. The internal elevation was whitewashed, benches in the naves were replaced, a new pulpit and choir stalls were built in the chancel. The church was rebuilt thanks to the foundation of Elector Frederick William and the involvement of the city's residents and the surrounding area.

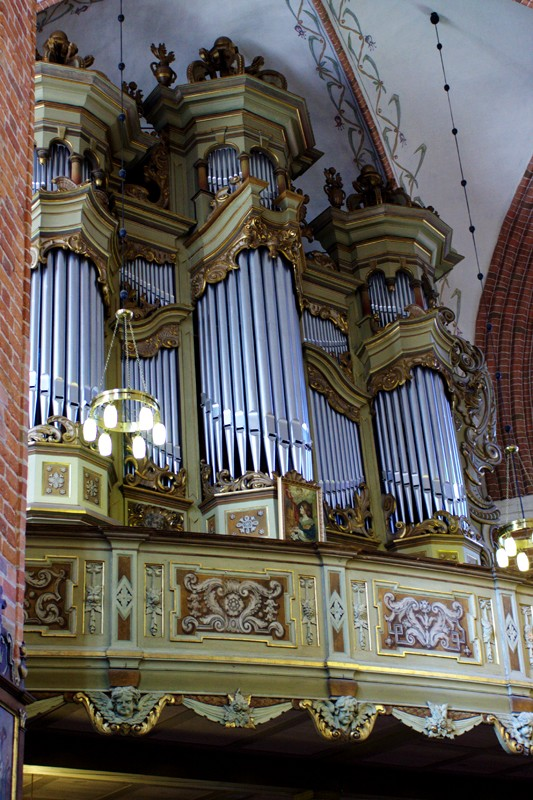
Organ folder of St. Mary's church

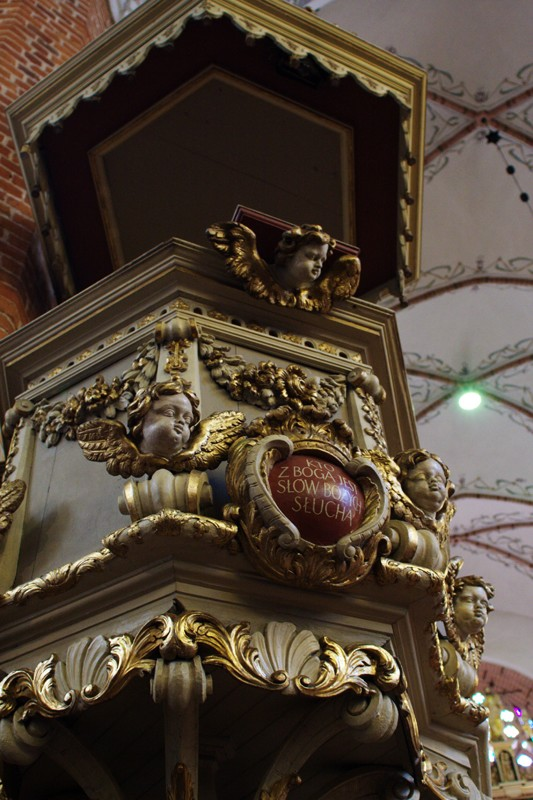
18th century pulpit

The main altar was made around 1700. It likely references an earlier altar by Rudolf Stockmann, which was destroyed in a fire. The three-story, three-axis altar measures 12.00 × 4.80 × 0.70 m and is entirely dedicated to the "Passion of Christ". In 1732, new 40-voice organs were installed, made by S. D. Richter, an organ builder from Kołobrzeg. (Note: Sources provide information about the organ from 1436, which was destroyed in a fire in 1658 (Chorzępa (2001, p. 12)).) In the second half of the 18th century, a pulpit was built, which is no longer in use today. In the 19th century, major repairs and renovations were carried out, including changes to the tower's crown in 1859. This involved removing the deteriorating Baroque spire with its lantern and installing a new copper one. In 1870, restoration work and reconstruction of damaged architectural elements were carried out. The intention of the architect Konrad Kruhl from Szczecin was to recreate the appearance of the church and incorporate new Neo-Gothic elements, such as new gables for the chancel, St. Mary's Chapel, and the sacristy. Further restoration work was carried out between 1909 and 1910 under the direction of W. Rossow, which included changes to the shape of the vault. Its construction was based on a rib vault. Rib vault supports were also reconstructed on pillars, and new bands were installed on capitals. The interior of the church was covered with new plaster, and the vault keystones were decorated with polychromy. At the same time, movable artifacts, such as the organs with the organ folder, galleries, benches, and paintings, were renovated.

In the 1970s, thermal modernization work was carried out (heating system). The last years of the late 20th and early 21st centuries also saw conservation and renovation projects, including the replacement of the roof covering and the improvement of the aesthetic appearance of the church tower. In 1948, three bells were hung and consecrated: St. Adalbert's (1,100 kg), St. Stanislaus' (700 kg), and St. Casimir's (60 kg). (Note: The sources do not convey about the further fate of the bells from 1658. According to the register of movable monuments of St. Mary's Church, there are five cast-iron bells from 1899 (measuring 68 × 74 cm), 1918 (100 × 100 cm), 1920 (80 × 82 cm), 1924 (86 × 84 cm) and 1930 (78 × 78 cm).) In 1957, the main altar underwent conservation. In 1984, a new clergy house was put into use, built at 17 3-Maja Street. In 1990, a cathedral altar was built according to Roman Falarczyk's design. In 2003, the fencing of the churchyard was changed. On 18 May 2005, a monument to Pope John Paul II was unveiled on the southern facade of the church tower. The 180-centimeter bronze sculpture was placed on a granite boulder according to the design by Alina Sołdyga-Solska.

The church was richly equipped with characteristic elements of medieval churches. From historical sources, it is known that there were 15 altars (including 14 side altars), benches, many valuable items, including richly decorated vessels and liturgical books, several bells, and a church library. Among the most famous church artifacts was an alabaster-marble altar made by Antwerp master Rudolf Stockmann and an early medieval granite baptismal font, which is now located in the church porch. (Note: A cylindrical Romanesque baptismal font in the shape of a flattened half-shaft (measuring 85 × 66 cm) serves as a stoup in the church porch. The present baptismal font, in the Baroque style, is located at the side altar.) The church is adorned with numerous 18th-century epitaphs (there are over 40 of them), (Note: According to unofficial data, there are more than 50 epitaphs in the church.) frescoes of biblical figures, and votive offerings (polychrome). Epitaphs are located in the church porch, part of the nave, the chancel, and St. Mary's Chapel. The church was enriched with a valuable 15th-century triptych measuring 1.53 × 1.12 m, which was transferred in the 1960s from the Church of the Immaculate Conception of the Blessed Virgin Mary in Górzyca. It now forms an altar in the side nave to the south.

According to preserved sources, 31 vicarages and 7 brotherhoods, which operated at St. Mary's Church, have been confirmed to this day.

From 1945 to 1977, the church was under the parish of the Sacred Heart of Jesus in Gryfice, which was run by the Society of Christ. On 10 August 1977, the parish of the Assumption of the Blessed Virgin Mary in Gryfice at St. Mary's Church was erected. From 1945 to 1961, the church was included in the structures of the Nowogard Deanery of the apostolic administration, and from 1961, it belonged to the newly created Gryfice Deanery, which was incorporated into the Roman Catholic Archdiocese of Szczecin-Kamień on 28 June 1972. The church was entered into the register of monuments of national heritage.

== Description ==
=== Technical data ===
Components of St. Mary's Church	Area	Volume
Chancel	189.7	5,891
Sacristy	59.1	985
Nave	645	21,526
St. Mary's Chapel	93.5	2,918
Church tower	127.7	7,240
Total (Σ)	1,115 m^{2}	38,660 m^{3}

=== General description ===
The church (a hall church type) was built in the Gothic style. It was constructed on a polygonal plan measuring 61.95 × 25.75 m. It consists of three main parts: the tower, a three-aisled hall, and the chancel. Additionally, there are the sacristy and the St. Mary's Chapel. The construction materials used for the building include granite, brick, wood, and roof tiles.

The chancel, with three spans, was built on a rectangular plan measuring 19.2 × 10.78 m. The sacristy is located next to it (on the southern side). The nave, also on a rectangular plan, forms a spacious three-aisled and four-span hall with a tied system and dimensions of 27.25 × 23.67 m. On the northern side of the nave, the St. Mary's Chapel was added. The four-story tower (compact bell tower) situated on a rectangular field (16.27 × 14.65 m) consists of five sections separated by cornices. It was added to the nave with the eastern wall. Its height is 51.5 m. The church tower, which features Renaissance and Baroque elements, is located on the western side of the building. A characteristic feature of the church is the predominance of vertical lines over horizontal ones.

According to K. Szczygieł, the building reached its final shape with a surface area of 1,108 m^{2} and a volume of 15,905 m^{3}. In the publication by A. Dobosiewicz Gryfice na przestrzeni wieków – Gryfice na starej fotografii (English: Gryfice throughout the ages – Gryfice in old photographs), the surface area and volume data are different. The author provided a surface area of 1,115 m^{2} and a volume of 38,660 m^{3}. Zenon Wyrwiński, in the publication Kościół pw. Wniebowzięcia Najświętszej Marii Panny w Gryficach (English: The Church of the Assumption of the Blessed Virgin Mary in Gryfice), provides different data regarding the surface area of the church. According to him, the building has an area of 1,581 m^{2}. (Note: The author probably also included the area of the clergy house at 17 3-Maja Street.) The difference in surface areas in the first two cases is small, amounting to 7 m^{2}. Between the first and third: 472 m^{2}, and between the second and third: 465 m^{2}. Volume data also differ. The difference in the first two cases is 22,755 m^{3}. The discrepancies in the data likely arise from measurement, calculation errors, or the reporting of net surface area and volume.

=== Chancel ===
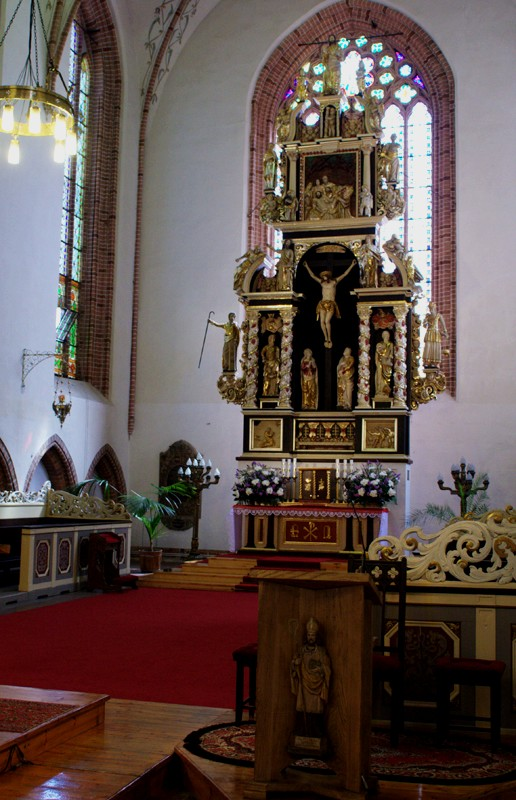
Main altar

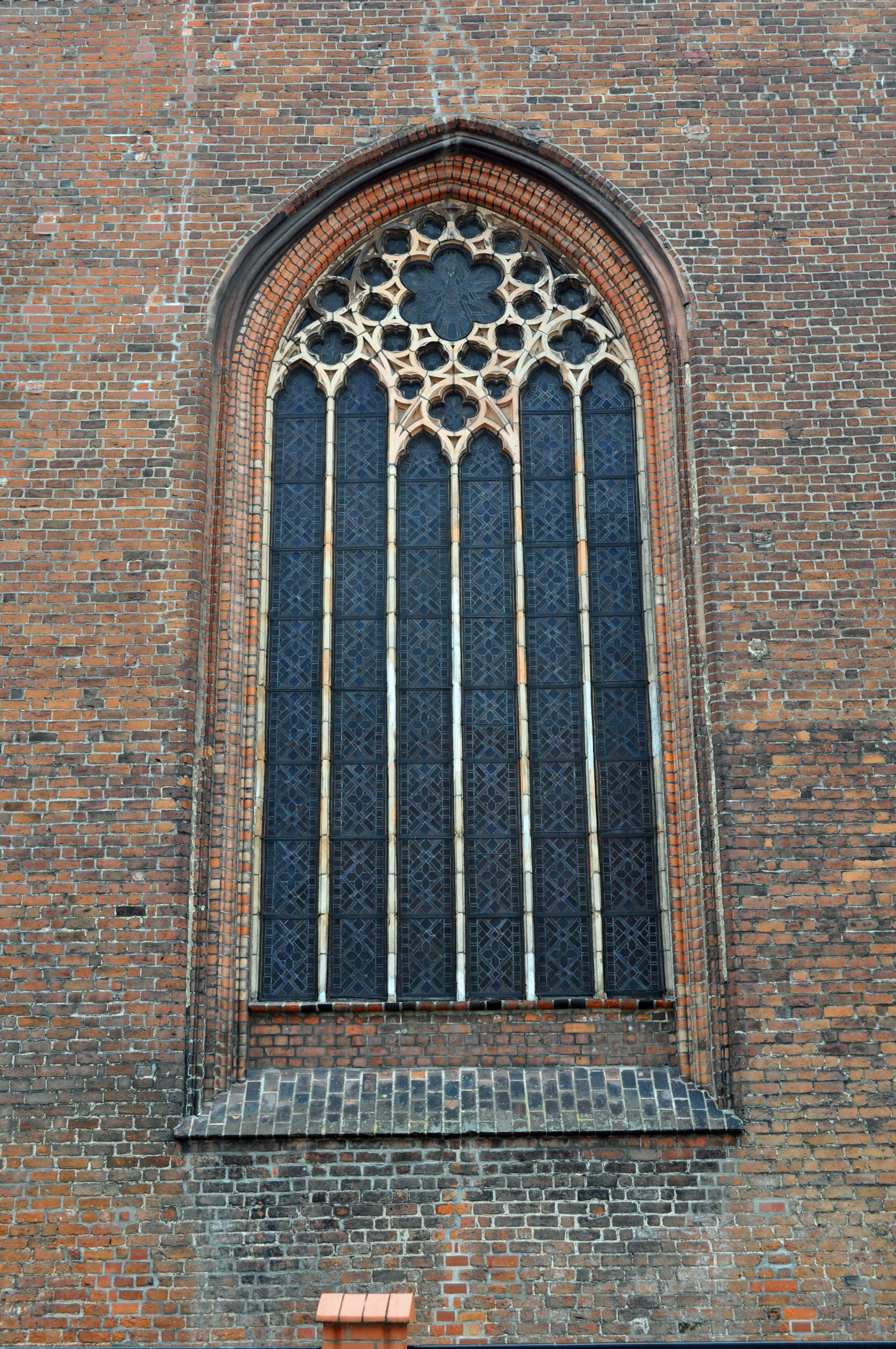
Tracery on a window in the chancel (eastern side)

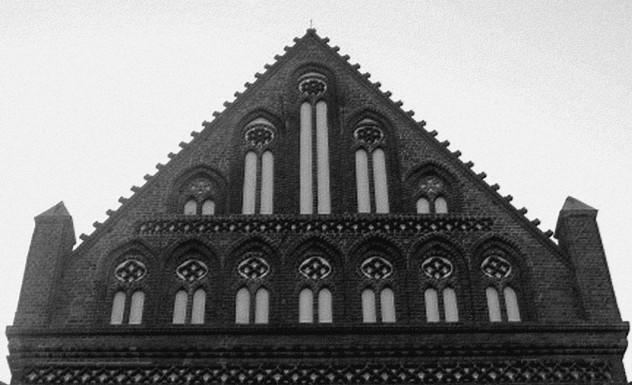
Apex of the facade

The chancel is oriented with its apex towards Wojska Polskiego Street and its ridge towards Kościelna Street. The eastern part of the church is covered with a gable roof with small dormers. These are square, two-winged, and covered with a tented roof.

The eastern facade features a single pointed arch window with two slopes and three jambs, separated by five bars and filled with a stained glass depicting the image of the Holy Spirit in the form of a dove. The upper part of the window is filled with a characteristic tracery (rosette type), typical of architectural decoration in the region. (Note: It is one of three windows in the church that have this decorative element. The two that are on St. Mary's Chapel contain different, simple traceries.) The lower part features a sill above the pulpit cornice. The facade is flanked by two corner five-meter-high buttresses. At the lower part, they contain decorative elements with lower pointed-arch niches (right niche), with one slope and two voussoirs, and a rounded slope (left niche), which also has a blind archivolt. Above the right niche, there is a three-sided bay window, finished at the bottom with a string course. Above, there are friezes with a single slope, surmounted by triangular wimpergs with blind tracery and symbols. The Lily refers to Virgin Mary, and the cross to the Catholic religion. Such decoration of the buttresses is unique in Pomerania.

The gable, resembling a pediment, is separated from the lower part by a string course, with a continuous frieze of blind tracery (white plastered). The fragment between the string course and the frieze (called mutule) is filled with horizontal rustic profiles, consisting of alternating profiles with a cross-section of a chamfer arranged alternately with different bricks. In the upper part, there are numerous blind windows. The first, lower row consists of seven uniform blind windows separated by a bar with blind tracery and two to three slopes. The second row, located above the string course with a different plastered frieze and blind tracery, contains five blind windows with two to three slopes, two pairs of which are symmetrically arranged relative to the largest central one. The blind windows are plastered white. The wall corners are decorated with pinnacles with tented roofs, and the top of the gable with a ridge ornament – a crocket (cross motif), which refers to the wimpergs.

The north wall of the chancel is pierced with three full windows separated by two bars with two slopes and two buttresses (left window) and one bar with a slope (central and right window). These windows are the only ones in the building with 19th-century stained glass. Above the windows is a cornice, and at the bottom, there is a continuous frieze with blind tracery. The space is filled with a mutule with the same profile as in the previous part of the facade. The windows have pulpit-like sills. The wall is reinforced with three buttresses. Between the second and third buttress, just below the third window, there is a blocked-up pointed-arch portal with three slopes and an irregular double jamb with a blind archivolt, decorated with ornaments in the shape of trefoils, pears, and hollows. It was probably once the main entrance from what is now Wojska Polskiego Street before additional parts of the church were added. The portal is surrounded by a masonry ashlar with two entrances with one slope and a segmental arch. On the south wall, besides the added sacristy, there is one full pointed-arch window, similar in appearance to those on the north side.

The interior of the chancel with a rib vault is filled with the main Baroque altar measuring 12.00 × 4.80 × 0.70 m, three Neo-Baroque choir stalls, a pulpit, 18th-century epitaphs, and candelabra. There is also an unused wall-mounted, basket-shaped pulpit supported by an angel (Baroque) measuring 6.00 × 1.75 m. The chancel is directly connected to the sacristy through a pointed-arch portal with four slopes and to the nave through the arcade chancel arch.

=== Sacristy ===
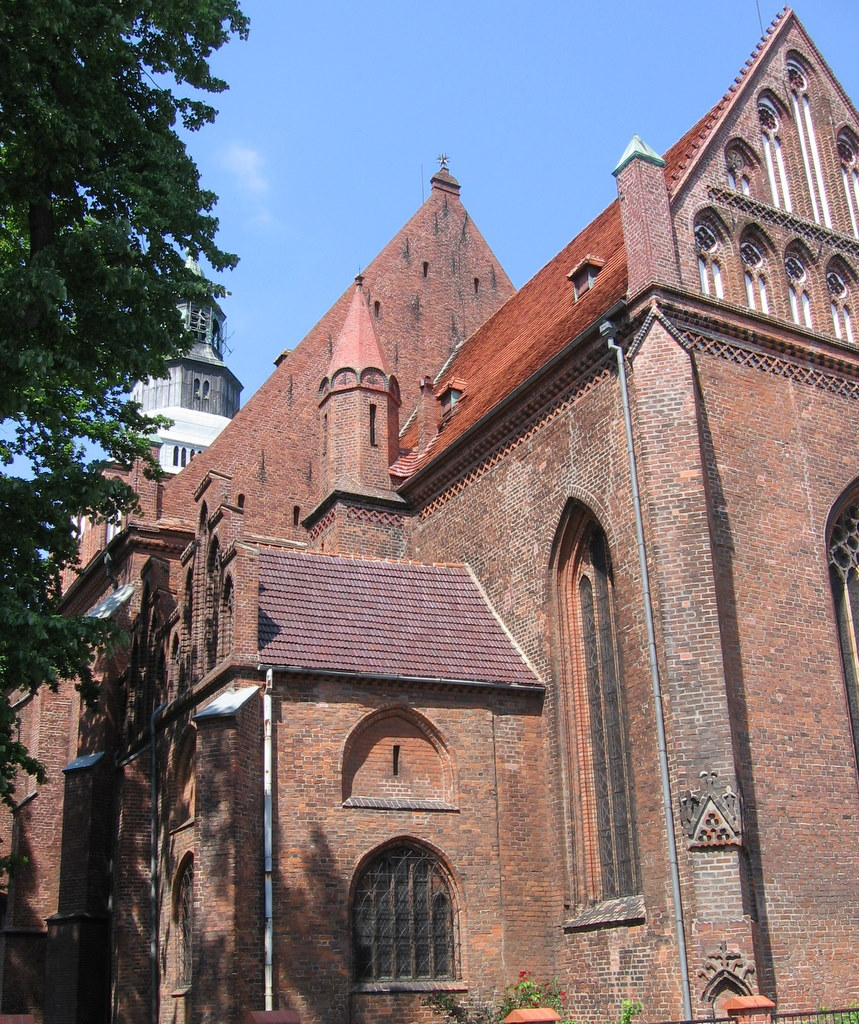
Sacristy and northeastern side of the chancel

To the southern part of the chancel wall and the eastern part of the nave, a single-span southern chapel (German: Süd-Kapelle, today: sacristy) with a double-pitched roof was added, with the ridge facing Wojska Polskiego Street. It was built on a rectangular plan.

In the facade wall, there are two large-span arched windows with a small impost, featuring one slope, four bars, and filled with stained glass. Above them are niches with a similar shape, featuring a single jamb and vertical, narrow openings with a lower pulpit-like sill. The wall is reinforced with corner buttresses. A narrow buttress separates a pair of windows and niches, further strengthening the southern facade. Below the left window is the entrance to the sacristy, with a simple profiled jamb and a four-centred arch, indicating its later reconstruction.

The facade is crowned with a stepped gable with blind windows (a type of double pediment), behind which are hidden double-pitched roofs. The blind windows with one slope are placed just above the string course with a pulpit face. Ten white-plastered segmented blind windows are separated by bars. They feature blind plastered tracery and are symmetrically arranged with respect to the facade axis. In the central part above the sacristy, there is a protruding part of an octagonal turret, crowned with a tented roof. The turret, resembling a pinnacle, is an extension of the buttress, which is located above the faced string course with a continuous frieze of blind plastered tracery. In the roofing part, it features an arcade frieze with Virgin Mary symbolism, and just below it, there are four narrow windows. The slopes of the gables are crowned with a so-called cornice molding with concave-convex raking moldings. The side, eastern wall of the sacristy features the same window as the facade part and a niche directly above it.

The interior of the sacristy consists of two rooms with different types of vaults, namely rib vault and lierne vault. They are connected by a single pointed-arch passage with stairs. One of the rooms is located on a half-floor (the so-called mezzanine).

=== Nave ===
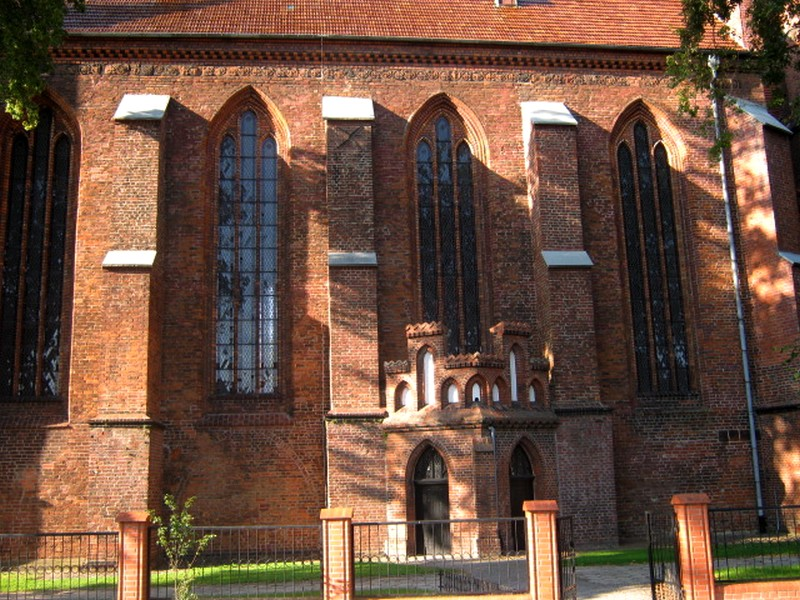
Southern facade of the nave

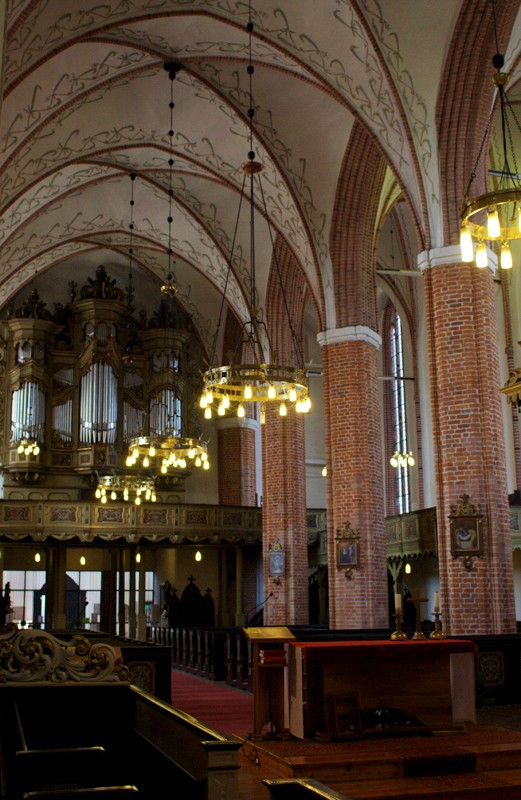
Nave hall of St. Mary's Church

The nave connects with the western wall of the chancel and the sacristy, with its ridge facing Kościelna Street. The hall is covered by a double-pitched roof with small dormer windows, once crowned with a small bell. Together with the roofing of the added St. Mary's Chapel, it forms a multi-pitched roof, slightly overlapping the church tower.

On the gable wall, there is one pointed-arch window with a single slope and a pulpit-like sill, divided by two bars. It has a plinth and an additional pulpit-like parapet cornice. Just below it, in the corner of the wall, there is a bricked-up pointed-arch entrance with a single slope. Above the window runs a cornice with a short metope frieze featuring a plant motif along with a characteristic modillion. The corners are topped with pinnacles and reinforced with buttresses. The gable of the wall, which has numerous narrow window openings, is crowned with a star. The southern wall features 4 four-jamb incomplete pointed-arch windows, divided by two bars and filled with stained glass. The windows on this elevation have a plinth, and at the bottom, pulpit-like parapet cornices.

A string course with a rustic profile at the bottom (with shapes resembling vault sections) separates the part of the wall from the roof slope. It features a continuous frieze with metope motifs of vine tendrils. This is the second such frieze encountered in Pomeranian religious architecture. A similar one is found on the facade of the Franciscan Church of St. John the Evangelist in Szczecin. In some publications, authors suggest that it was transferred from the former, demolished Franciscan church, which was located on Kościelna Street in Gryfice. In the fragment below the right window of the southern wall, there are also metopes embedded into the southern elevation (so-called spolia). Above the upper frieze (mutule), there are two rows of two- and three-layer walls with a cross brickwork. The length of the elevation is reinforced with two buttresses and strengthened with three with two slopes, located between the windows.

Between the second and third buttress, at the bottom of the elevation, a side entrance to the church was added. It is hexagonal in plan, angled towards Kościelna Street. On two walls, there are two-pointed-arch portals with two slopes, the second forming the jamb. Above the doors, there are so-called pointed-arch transoms, divided by three bars and filled with stained glass. The corner is reinforced with a buttress. In the upper part, divided by a string course with a pulpit-like face, there are seven pointed-arch blinds (one corner and two pairs of smaller and larger ones with two slopes). The side entrance is topped with a double stepped gable with a butterfly roof. The gable slopes are crowned with a pulpit-like face with a so-called crowning cornice, a double rustic profile, and concave-convex raking moldings.

On the western elevation of the nave, on both sides, there are blind archivolts with three niches and two bricked-up portals. On the right side (in the upper part), there is a rectangular, rounded niche. At the bottom (bricked-up) portal, with a concave-convex pointed arch and a single pointed-arch slope. On the left side, there are two niches, with the upper one being rectangular with a single slope, the middle one wider, but rounded with a segmental arch, and the lower one (bricked-up portal) with a concave-convex pointed arch and two slopes. It is finished with a characteristic wimperg. The western wall is reinforced with buttresses and octagonal towers with tented roofs. The upper parts of the towers are wider than the lower ones, divided by a horizontal rustic profile. They also have an arcade frieze and metopes with plant motifs. The roof gables of the tower are crowned with flower motifs.

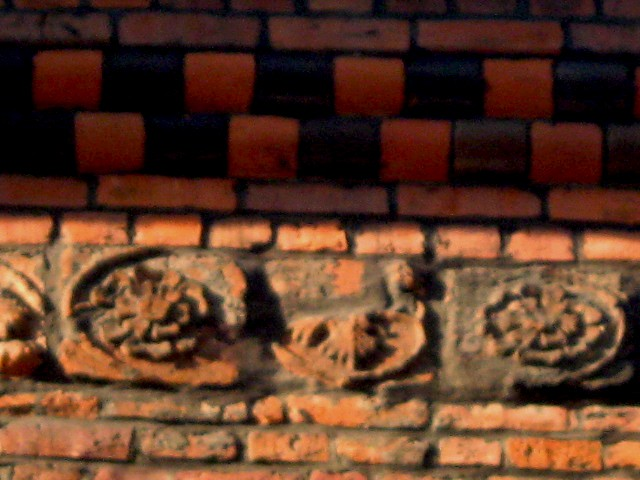
Metope frieze

On the northern wall of the nave, there are two windows with two slopes, divided by two bars, one directly above the wing of the building. At the top, there is a cornice with a metope frieze with a floral motif and a modillion, which is identical to the southern one. The wing is characterized by a simple structure with a bricked-up pointed-arch portal with three cut slopes (the so-called "dead" portal, from which doors used to lead to the church cemetery) with a distinguished capital and foundation zone. It is topped with a faced, pulpit-like doorframe cornice. The wall is reinforced with one buttress located between the windows and two corner ones. On the left side of the elevation, St. Mary's Chapel was added.

From the church porch to the nave, there are wide metal and glazed doors (main double-winged and a pair of side single-winged) with a rectangular transom. The structure of the nave with rib-vaulting and a truss system is supported by six main and octagonal pillars, connected by transverse beams with buttresses. The remaining four are attached to the wall of the western and eastern walls of the nave and also serve as buttresses. The main pillars separate the main nave from the side aisles (ambulatories). Above the side aisles, there are wooden galleries supported by rafters. The side matronea are connected to part of the organ folder. Additionally, the nave has two long galleries with separate entrances, located on the southern and northern walls. They serve as side additional choirs. Directly opposite the southern ambulatory is a 15th-century side altarpiece (triptych). The inner elevation contains 18th-century epitaphs and is covered with numerous polychrome frescoes, including figural polychromes.

==== St. Mary's Chapel ====
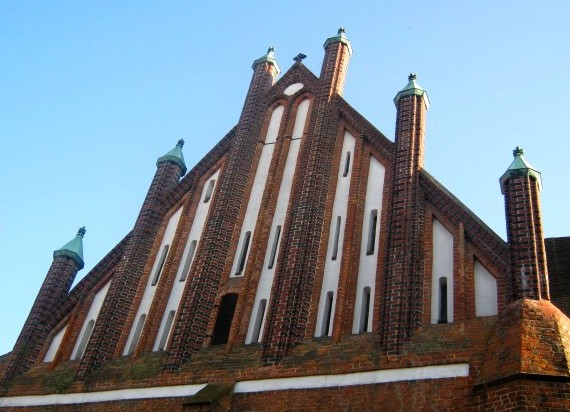
Apex of the chapel's facade

The northern facade of the nave was extended with a two-storey chapel of St. Mary, featuring a gable roof with small dormer windows (part of the multi-pitched roof, which together form the nave). The roof is bordered by an attic on the northern side. The facade faces Victory Square, while the ridge faces Wojska Polskiego and Niepodległości streets. Built on a quadrangle plan, in the late Gothic style, as the final part of the religious structure.

In the front section, two stained glass windows with two chamfers, two mullions, and lower parapet pulpits are placed. The left one has a plinth and an additional parapet cornice. Beneath the right window, there is a pointed-arch portal with five voussoirs and rusticated, rounded, full-arch reveals. The irregularly arranged corbels have profiles with a cross-section of batons, using brickwork. Double doors lead to the chapel, with a rounded upper part. On the right side, a pentagonal tower is situated, accessible from the inside by stairs. It is crowned with a truncated butterfly roof resembling an inverted chalice, protruding beyond the face of the tower. The wall in the central and corner parts has been reinforced with buttresses, which in the upper part merge into a continuous, straight plastered frieze. At the top of the elevation, there are ten white plastered embrasures. Each pair is divided by a mullion. They are symmetrically placed relative to the apex axis, forming two equally sized details. Above the central, highest pair, a circular embrasure is placed, reminiscent of a smooth tondo. The embrasures have unevenly distributed narrow window openings and one larger opening with a segmental arch and chamfer. The apex is crowned with six pinnacles, each having pyramidal roofs with finials.

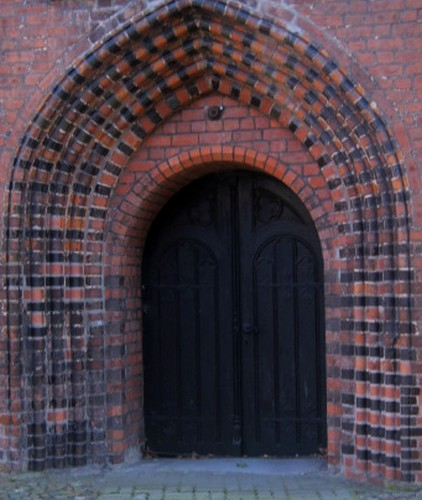
Portal of the chapel

The western facade is equipped with two windows of different sizes. The first, full one on the left side, is almost round. It is a window with two chamfers, two mullions, and a parapet at the bottom. The second, placed on the right side, is narrower (also full), with a segmental arch and two chamfers, divided by a single mullion and having a simple tracery in the upper part. The bottom is filled with a parapet. A buttress is placed in the middle, dividing the frieze with blind tracery under a rustic profile and cornice. This part of the elevation is also reinforced by a corner buttress and a pentagonal tower. The eastern elevation is almost identical to the western one, except that the windows are incomplete and have a plinth, finished at the bottom with a double parapet. The narrower one, with tracery, is on the left side, and opposite it, on the western side, is a twin window. This part of the elevation lacks a frieze; instead, it is finished with a cornice, with a rustic profile at the bottom.

The interior of the chapel consists of one main room, located on the western wall. The room with a rib vault is supported by an octagonal pillar. It covers half of the chapel's area. Two smaller rooms of different sizes are placed on the second floor on the eastern side. The main hall connects to the nave through a portal and to the upper rooms and tower via stairs. The church library was arranged in one of the rooms on the upper floor. In the southeastern part of the ground floor, there is a burial crypt of Field Marshal Adam von Flemming-Rönz. In 1910, the sarcophagus with the remains of the deceased was transferred to the Flemming family mausoleum in Benice near Kamień Pomorski. Among the crypt's relics is a wooden epitaph with a gilded Latin inscription, located on the eastern wall of the chapel.

=== Church tower ===
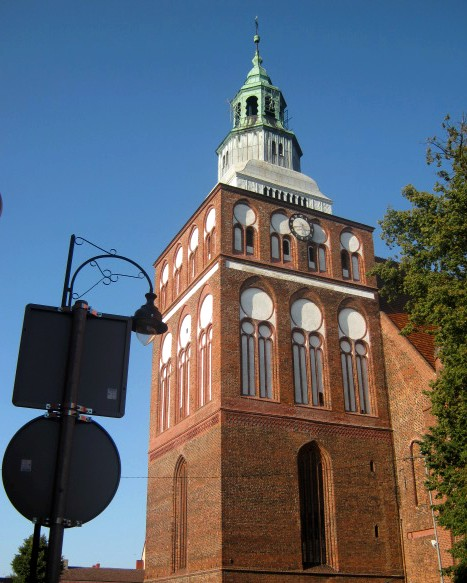
Church tower

The church tower (compact belfry) faces the Niepodległości Street with its facade. It consists of five parts, separated by a dividing cornice.

In the first, lower part of the tower on the western side, there is a pointed-arch portal with eight voussoirs. The corbels have profiles with a cross-section of batons, with different brickwork. Wooden double doors are mounted in the bossaged, pointed-arch reveal. (Note: In the 1970s, the Baroque doors of the main portal were removed. New ones were installed in their place.) Above the portal lintel, there is a tympanum with a cartouche, adorned with an inscription: St. Mary's Church in Gryfice. Blind archivolts are visible on the southern wall. In the second part, three full Gothic windows are situated, with a segmental arch and three voussoirs, separated by three mullions (southern, western, and northern sides). The windows are filled with stained glass and finished with a parapet cornice at the bottom. Above them, there is a wide plastered frieze with blind tracery. At the bottom, just above the face, there are ten architectural details, called mascarons, probably depicting the builders and founders of the tower.

The third part of the tower features large pointed-arch embrasures, three on each wall, filled with plastered blind tracery, crowned with a rounded rosette and divided into smaller longitudinal blind biforas (Stargard type). These also have a rounded rosette and are divided by a pillar and two mullions. Above them is a simple plastered frieze. The fourth part contains small embrasures, four on each wall, visually similar to the larger ones, except they lack rounded smaller rosettes and are divided only by one bifora pillar. Some of them have window openings. Between the second and third embrasure on the southern and northern sides, clock faces are placed. Two narrow embrasures also appear on the eastern side, in the corner of the tower facade, separated by the ridge of the gable roof over the nave. The embrasures are plastered white. Besides their decorative function, they also serve to relieve the weight of the upper parts of the structure by reducing the thickness of the wall. The tower is crowned with a two-stepped cornice.

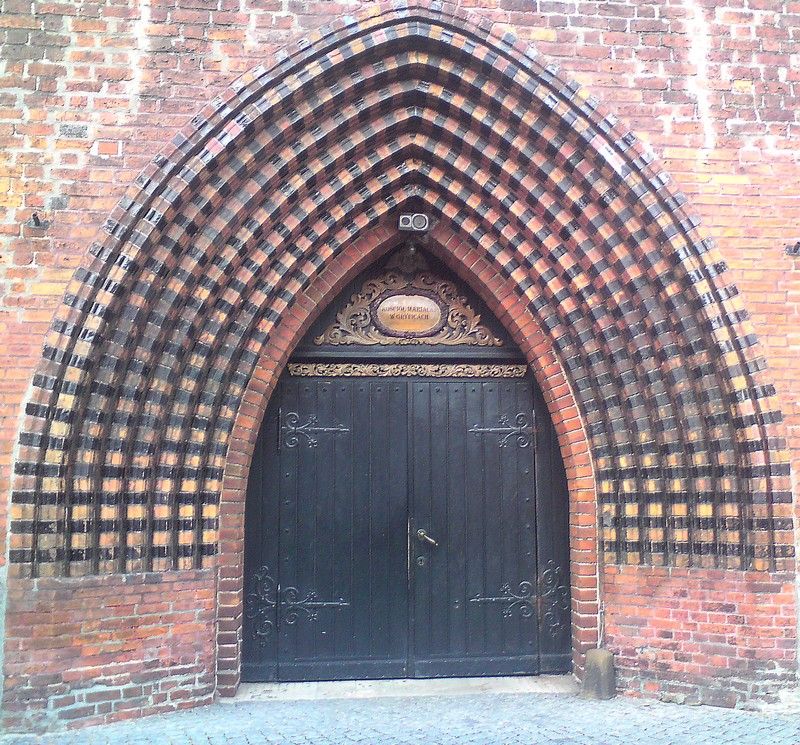
Main portal of the church

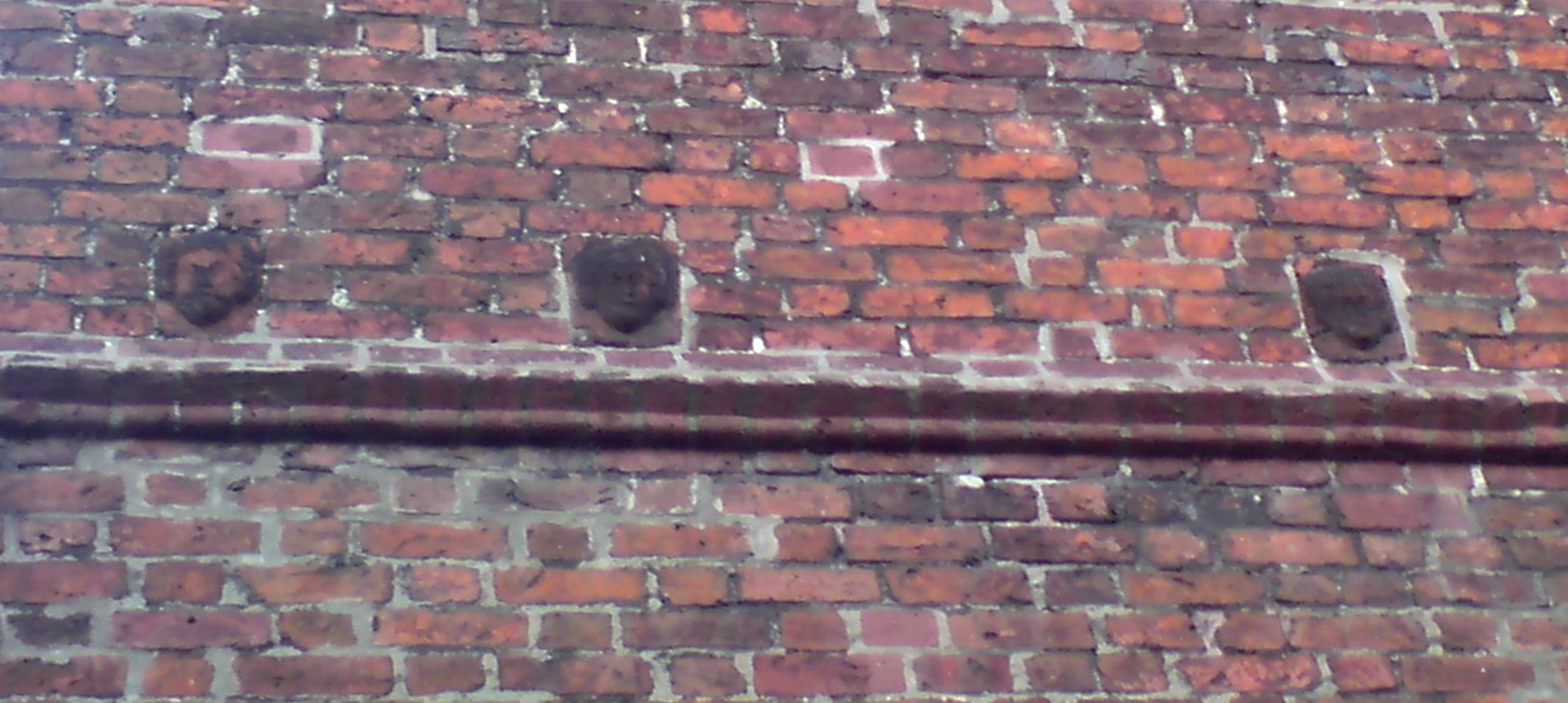
Mascarons on the facade of the church tower

The fifth and highest part is crowned with a Baroque, copper spire. Its base forms a truncated pyramidal roof. Above it, a cubic structure is located, with eight narrow sound openings, positioned on each of the four walls and covered with a spire. Above it, there is an octagonal roof lantern. The first, wooden lower part is wider. It has two narrow sound openings on each of the four sides and is covered with a truncated pyramidal roof. The second, narrower part with eight window openings with segmental arches and concave-convex bases (a type of viewing balcony) is covered, like the first part, with the same type of roofing. The uppermost part is a pinnacle, topped with a finial.

The interior of the tower comprises a star-vaulted vestibule. Here are located: a historic early medieval baptismal font, numerous 18th-century epitaphs, and one contemporary from 1973. Memorial plaques are also placed on the inner facade. An arched entrance leads to the upper part of the tower, filled with a wooden door leaf, located in the eastern wall of the vestibule, on the southern facade.

=== Illumination ===
The building, as the first of the city's historic structures, has been illuminated with special light fixtures, which were installed in the ground and directed towards the load-bearing walls of the structure. Metal-halide and sodium-vapor lamps were installed. The tower roof is also illuminated.

== See also ==
- St. Mary's Church

== Bibliography ==
- Cieśliński, A. (1993). "Tablice epitafijne w kościele pw. WNMP w Gryficach". Ziemia Gryficka 1993. Kościół katolicki na ziemi gryfickiej (in Polish). Szczecin–Gryfice: Bogdan.
- Chorzępa, M. (2001). "Kościelne dzieje Gryfic (1262-1962)". In Cieśliński, A. (ed.). Zeszyty Gryfickie (in Polish) (1 ed.). Gryfice: Gryfice.
- Dobosiewicz, A. (2004). Gryfice na przestrzeni wieków – Gryfice na starej fotografii (in Polish). Bydgoszcz: Twarda.
- Jurkiewicz, J. L. (2011). Kościół Wniebowzięcia NMP w Gryficach. Zabytki Pomorza Zachodniego (in Polish). Vol. 4. Stargard Szczeciński: Stowarzyszenie Zachodniopomorskie Dziedzictwo Kulturowe.
- Szczygieł, K. (1987). "Raport o stanie zabytków w Gryficach". In Kozłowski, K. (ed.). Ziemia Gryficka 1945-1985 (in Polish). Gryfice: Gryfickie Towarzystwo Kultury w Gryficach.
- Jarząb, W. (2007-06-07). "O drodze na szczyt i upadku nieszczęśliwym". Gryfickie Echa (in Polish). Gryfice.
- Wyrwiński, Z. (2007-08-23). "Kościół pw. Wniebowzięcia Najświętszej Marii Panny w Gryficach". Nevgazeta Gryficka (in Polish). Nowogard.
