= Wimperg =

Architectural element

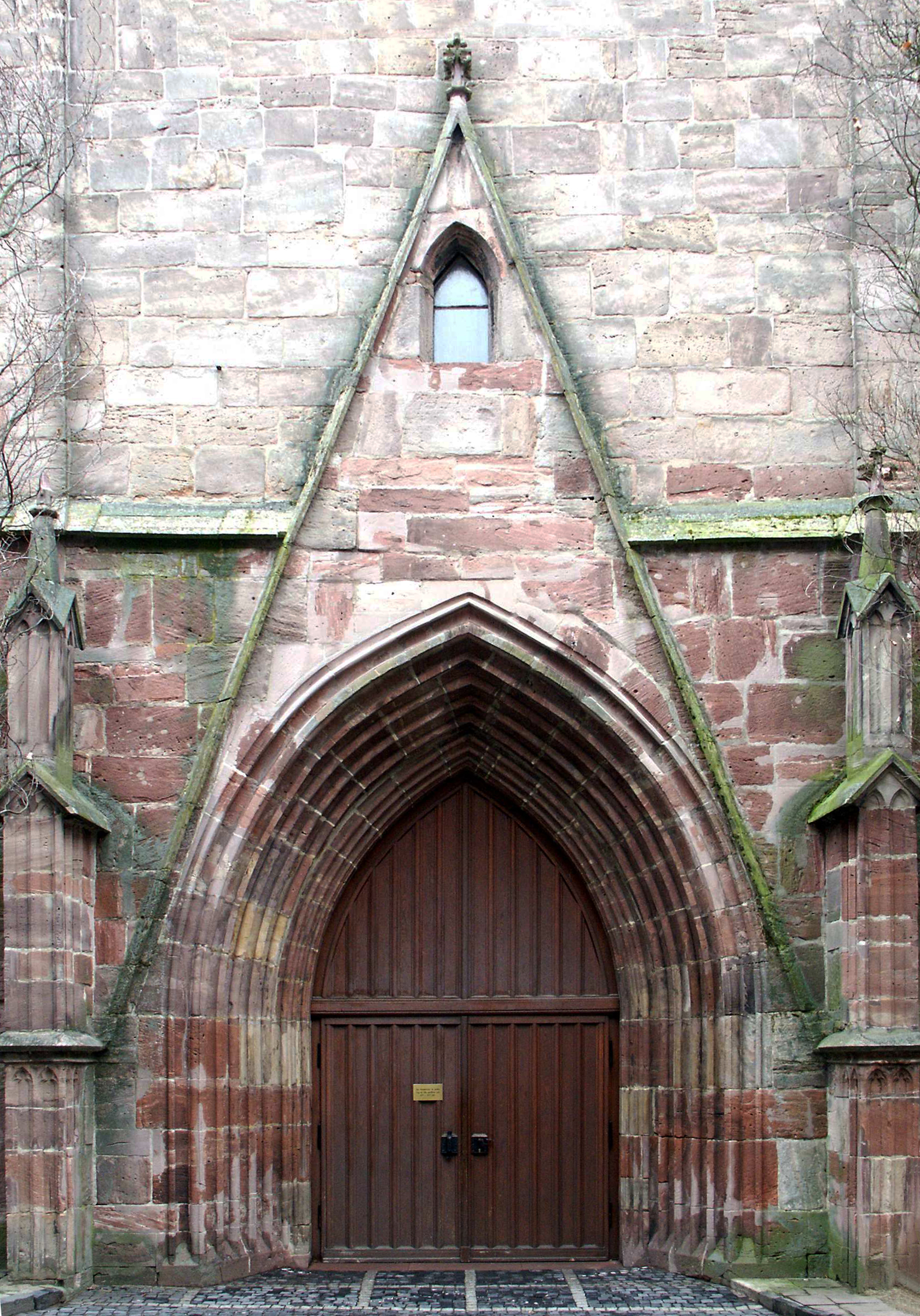
Early Gothic wimperg with pinnacles above the west portal of the Bad Hersfeld town church (around 1330)

Oriel window with wimperg and pinnacles on the Imperial Hall of the Old Town Hall in Regensburg in Bavaria, Germany

In Gothic architecture, a wimperg is a gable-like crowning over portals and windows and is also called an ornamental gable. Outside of immediate architecture, the wimperg is also found as a motif in Gothic carving.

== Etymology ==
The word has been documented in German since the 10th century (Old High German wintberga, Middle High German wintberge). The original meaning was "that which protects against the wind, conceals [birgt in German]". What was originally meant were gable parts that protrude above the roof. In this context, Wintberge is also found in older sources in the meaning "merlon" ( mentions Middle High German wintburgelin "merlon"), occasionally also "Wimperg" as "tooth-like top extension to the parapet wall of a battlement".

== Forms ==
The wimperg is considered an architectural element which, as an ornamental gable, reinforces the Gothic style's drive for height. It can be flanked, framed or even occupied by pinnacles. The gable slopes of the wimperg were often framed or occupied with crockets. Its gable peak is often executed as a gable flower, for example as a cruciform ornament. In German, the name Frauenschuh ("women's shoe") has been handed down for wimpergs with a tip that overhangs to the front. The gable field may be left plain, but it is often filled with pre-faced or openwork tracery.

== Heraldry ==
The wimperg has also made it into some coats of arms as part of a heraldic figure. Predominantly, the architectural object is used to place a coat of arms in the free space under the legs for filling and ornamentation. For heraldry, it is more important that it is represented in the coat of arms. The building part in the coat of arms is mentioned in the blazon and should then also be appropriately acknowledged by the coat of arms' painter. A good example is the coat of arms of the town of Kamenz. Here, according to the description of the coat of arms, there is a golden wimperg decorated with crockets on a golden battlement wall. Often the wimperg is described as a "triangular gable", and it does not always have to be flanked by crockets or have a finial on top. The number of coats of arms with a wimperg remains manageable. In the description of the coat of arms of Fehrbellin before 1993, one could read of the quatrefoil in the wimperg.

Kamenz

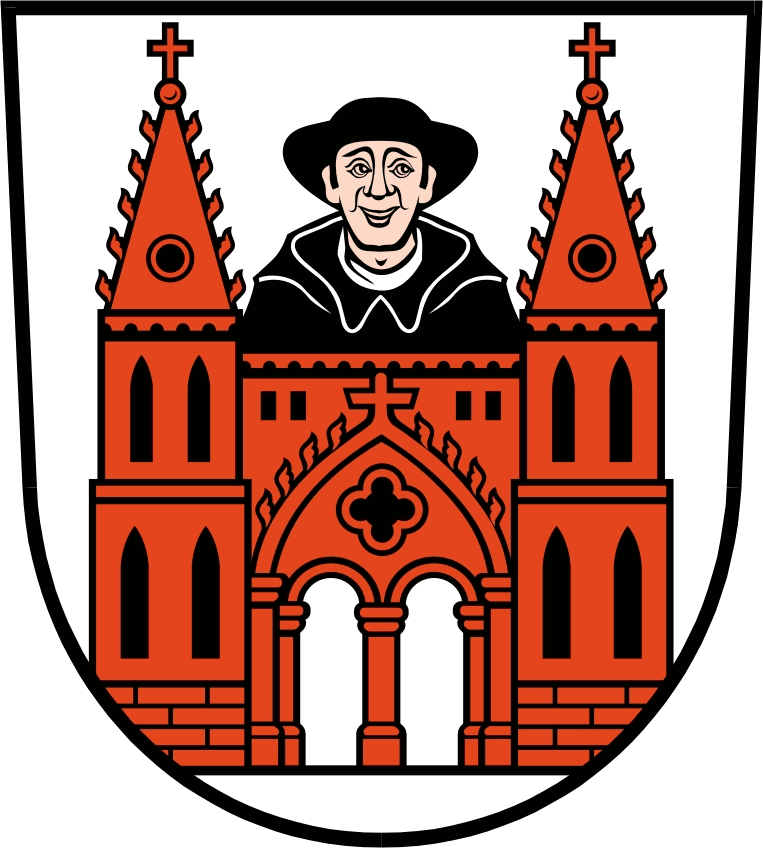
Fehrbellin

Frankfurt (Oder)

Lüneburg

Montabaur
