= Crocket =

Decorative element common in Gothic architecture

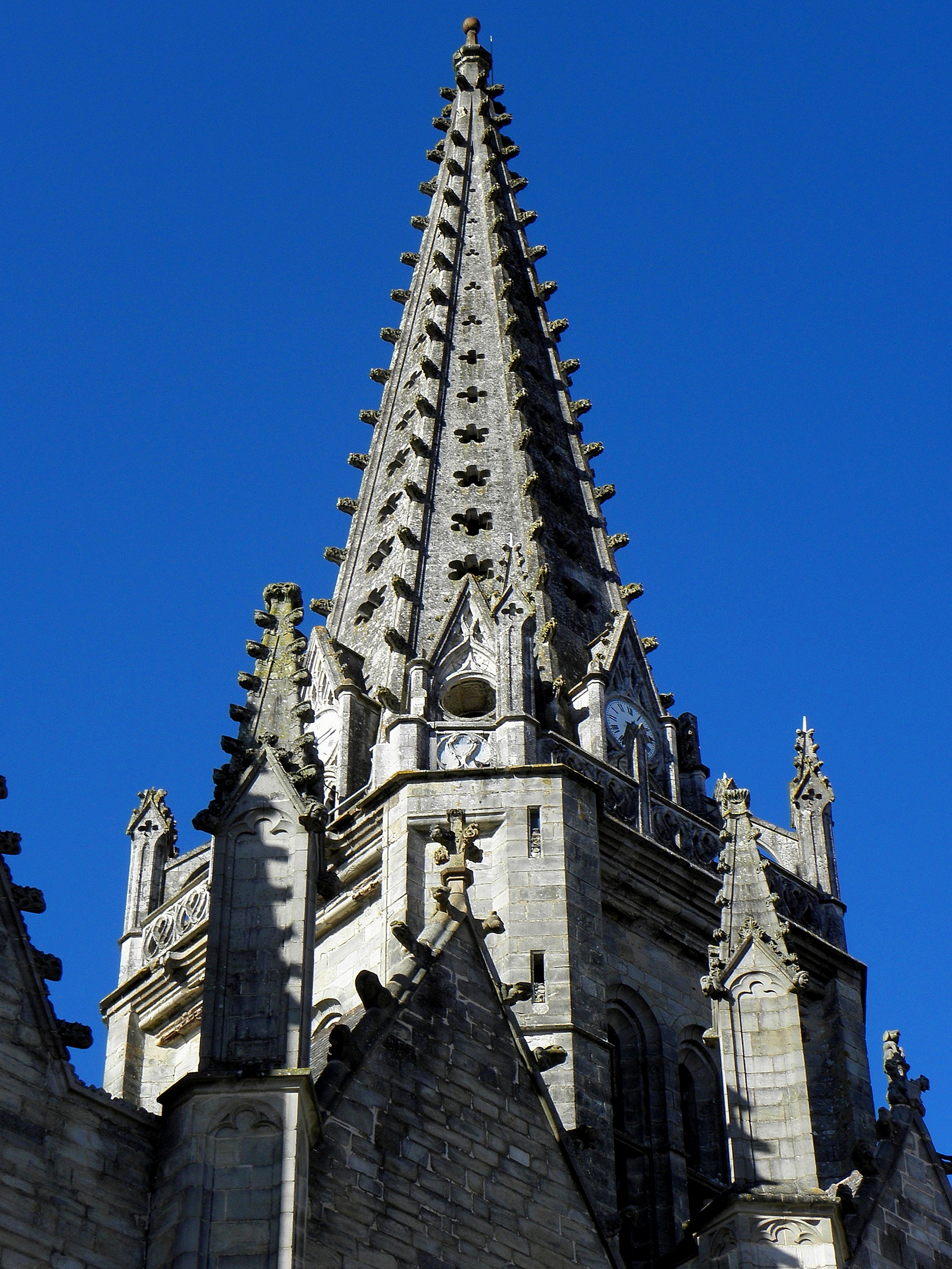
Crocketed spire of the Notre-Dame Church in Vitré, France

A crocket (or croquet) is a small, independent decorative element common in Gothic architecture. The name derives from the diminutive of the Old French croc, meaning "hook", due to the resemblance of a crocket to a bishop's crook-shaped crosier. Crockets, in the form of stylized carvings of curled leaves, buds or flowers, are used at regular intervals to decorate (for example) the sloping edges of spires, finials, pinnacles, and wimpergs.

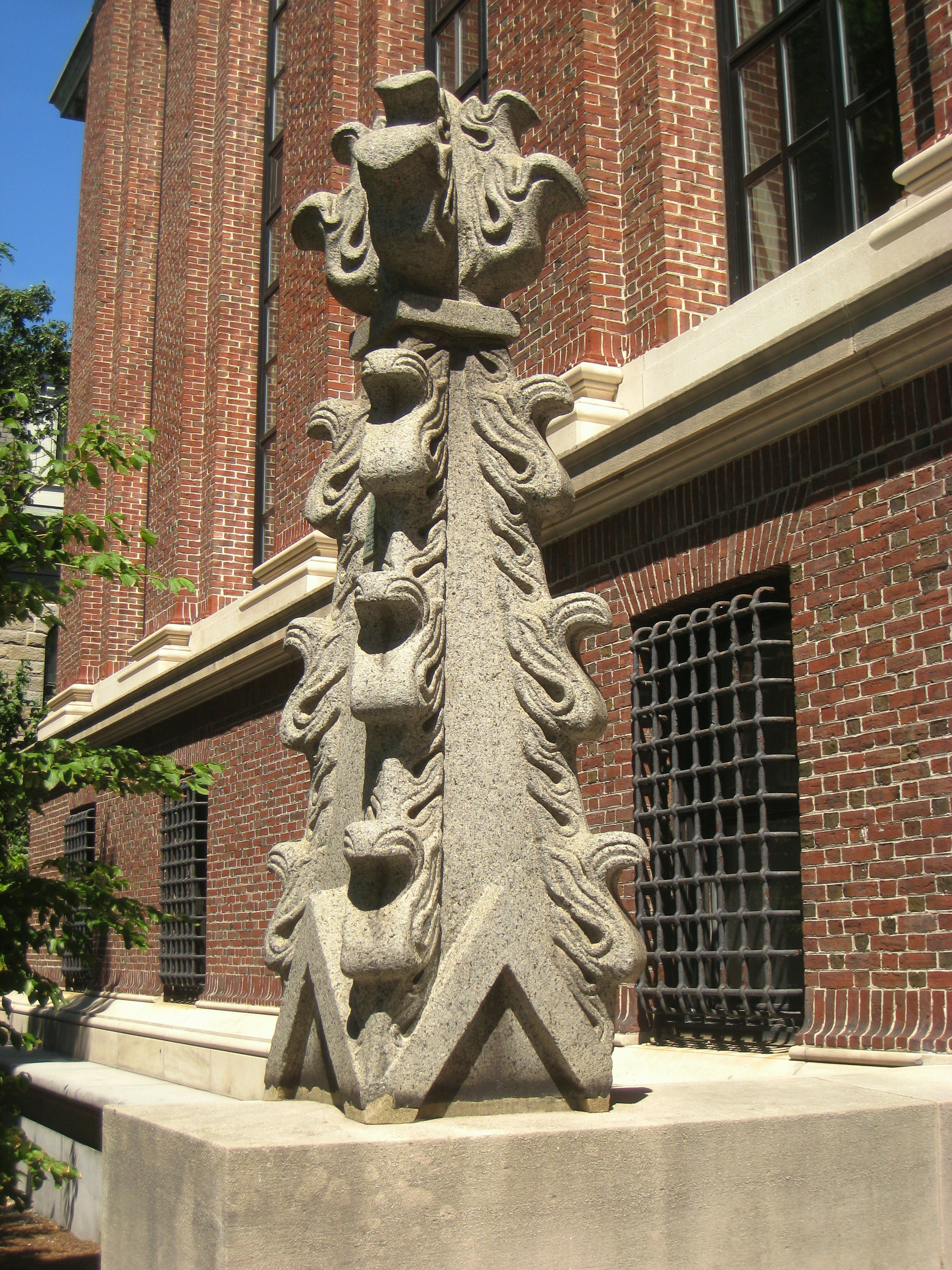
A finial with several crockets, at Gore Hall, Harvard University

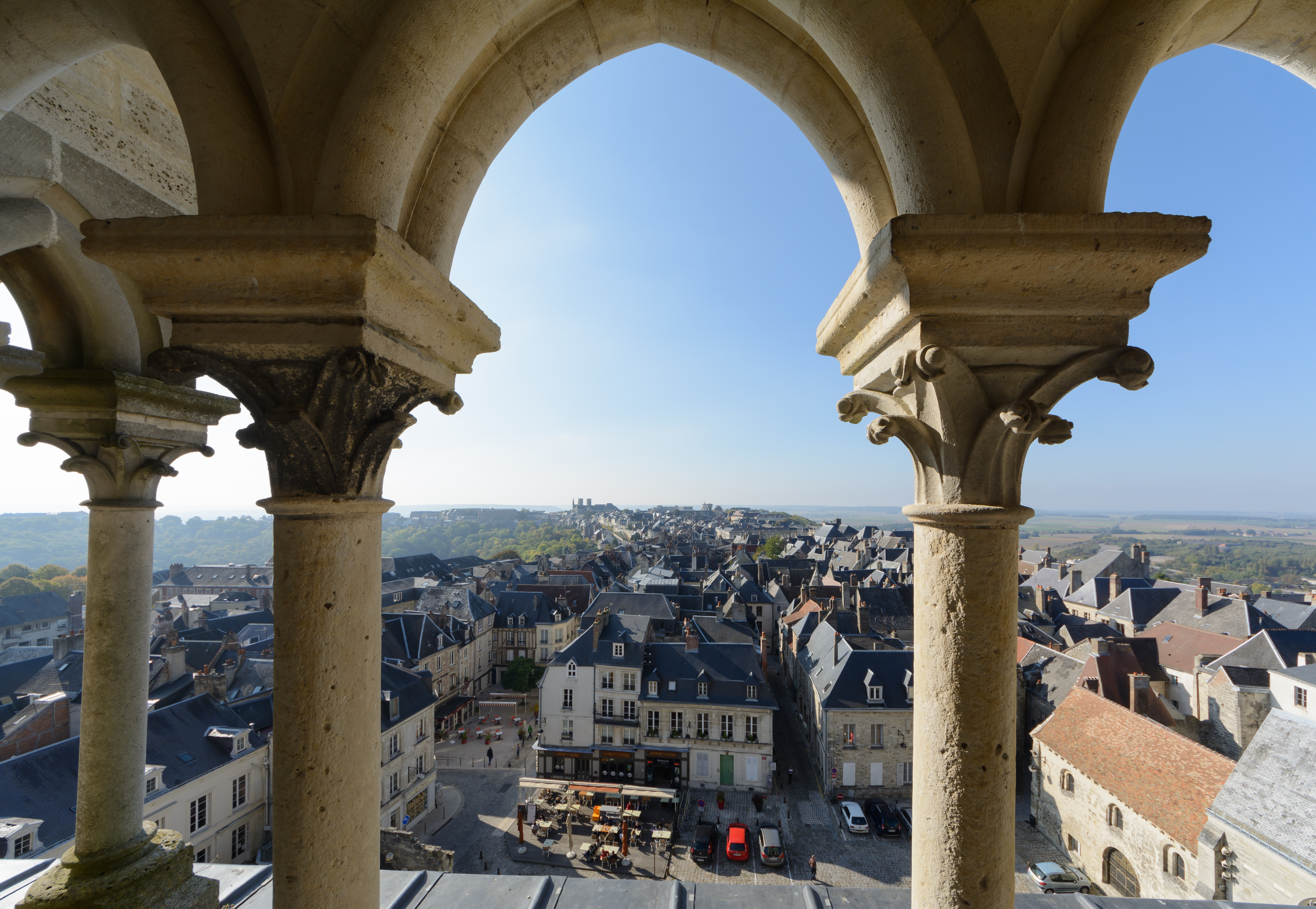
Crocket capitals on Laon Cathedral

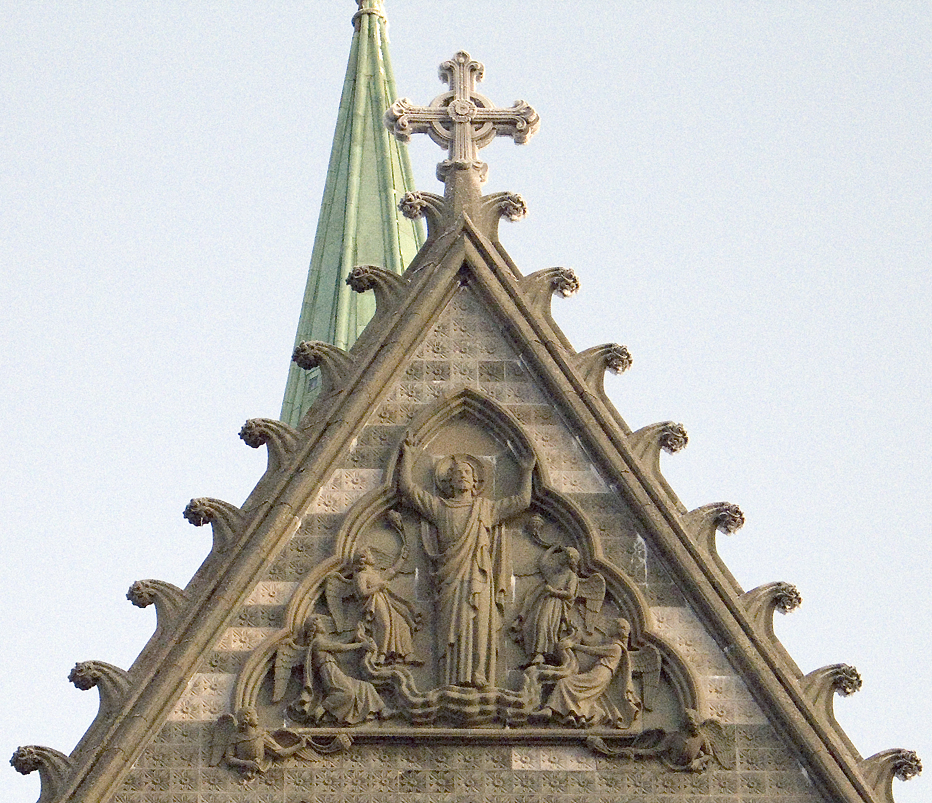
A 20th century crocketed gable on Nidaros Cathedral, Trondheim

When crockets decorate the capitals of columns, these are called crocket capitals. Crocket capitals were particularly common in Early Gothic architecture, falling out of fashion in the 13th century. Crockets were also used as an ornament on furniture and metalwork in the Gothic style. Like many other aspects of Gothic architecture, crockets became fashionable again in the 19th century as part of the Gothic Revival.
