= Górzyca, West Pomeranian Voivodeship =

Górzyca
- Village
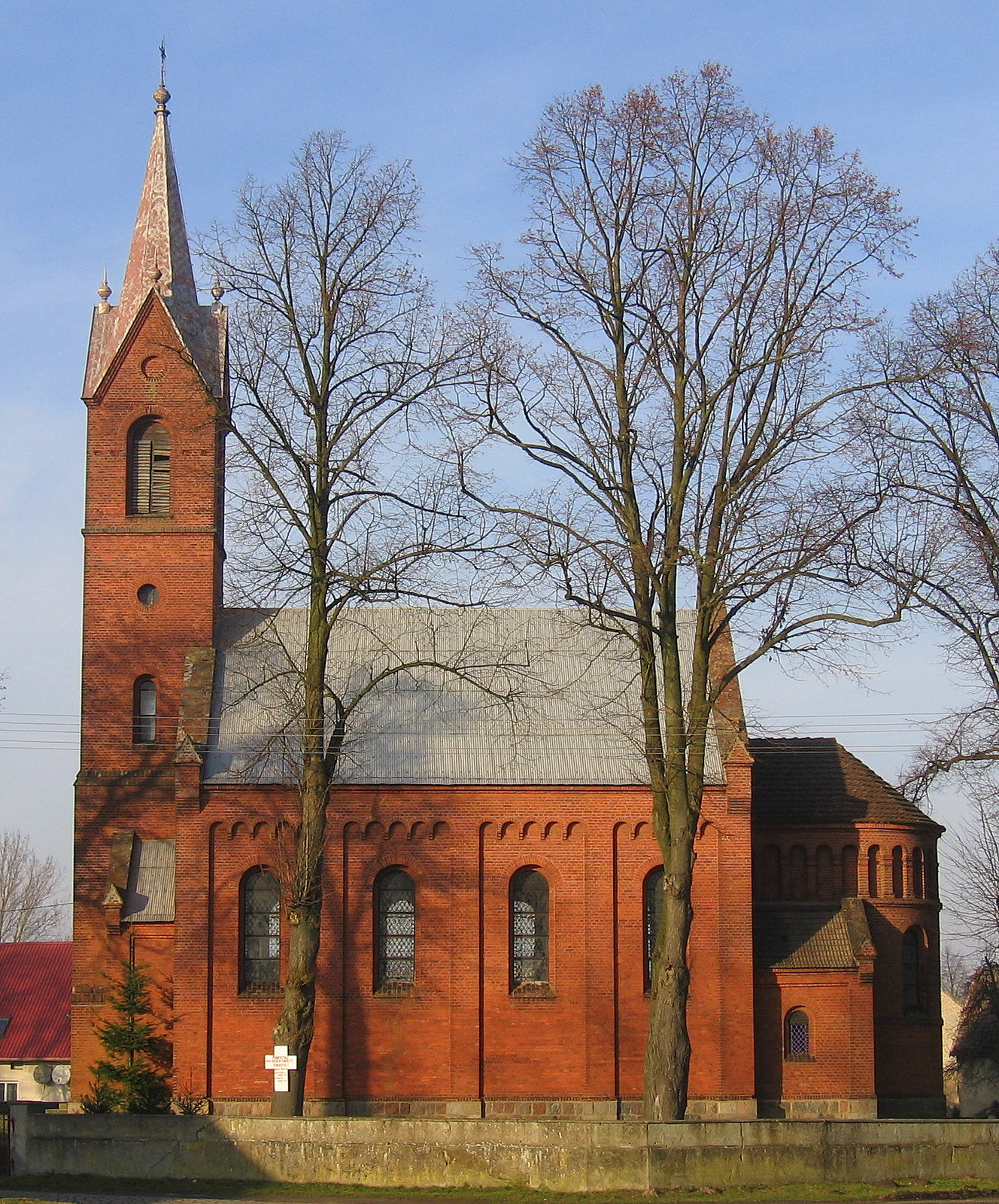
- Church of the Immaculate Conception of the Virgin Mary

- Location within Poland
- Coordinates: 53°58′41″N 15°14′13″E
- Country: Poland
- Voivodeship: West Pomeranian
- County: Gryfice
- Gmina: Gryfice

Population
  - Total: 234
- Time zone: UTC+1 (CET)
  - Summer (DST): UTC+2 (CEST)
- Vehicle registration: ZGY

Górzyca [ɡuˈʐɨt͡sa] is a village in the administrative district of Gmina Gryfice, within Gryfice County, West Pomeranian Voivodeship, in north-western Poland. It lies approximately 8 km (5 mi) north of Gryfice and 76 km (47 mi) north-east of the regional capital Szczecin.

The village has a population of 234.
