= Kamionka, Stargard County =

Kamionka
- Settlement
- Location within Poland
- Coordinates: 53°27′44″N 15°25′43″E
- Country: Poland
- Voivodeship: West Pomeranian
- County: Stargard
- Gmina: Chociwel
- Population: 4
- Time zone: UTC+1 (CET)
  - Summer (DST): UTC+2 (CEST)
- Area code: +48 91
- Car plates: ZST

Kamionka [kaˈmjɔnka] (German Glashagen) is a settlement in the administrative district of Gmina Chociwel, within Stargard County, West Pomeranian Voivodeship, in north-western Poland. It lies approximately 6 km (4 mi) east of Chociwel, 30 km (19 mi) north-east of Stargard, and 57 km (35 mi) east of the regional capital Szczecin.

The settlement has a population of 4. For the history of the region, see History of Pomerania

== Geography and transport ==
Kamionka is located on the southwestern edge of the Iński Landscape Park, along a secondary road connecting Ińsko (8 km) with Kamienny Most (3 km) and National road 20 (4 km), as well as Chociwel (7 km). There is no railway connection.

== History ==
The settlement, formerly known as Glashagen, was established as a Vorwerk of Steinhöfel and until 1945 was part of the combined municipality of Steinhöfel-Nöblin (Kamienny Most-Lublino). It was located in Saatzig District in the Province of Pomerania of Prussia, within the Stettin administrative region.

Since 1945, the settlement, which bears the common Polish name Kamionka, has been part of Gmina Chociwel, Stargard County, West Pomeranian Voivodeship. From 1975 to 1998, it was part of the Szczecin Voivodeship.
