= Chociwel (disambiguation) =

Chociwel may refer to the following places:

- Chociwel, a town in West Pomeranian Voivodeship in north-western Poland
- Chociwel, Lower Silesian Voivodeship, a village in south-western Poland
- Chociwel Wieś, a settlement in Stargard County, West Pomeranian Voivodeship, in north-western Poland
- Chociwel Commune, an administrative district in Stargard County, West Pomeranian Voivodeship, in north-western Poland
