= Kania =

Kania may refer to the following:

== Localities in Poland ==
- Kania, Gmina Sieroszewice, Ostrów County in Greater Poland Voivodeship, west-central Poland
- Kania, Słupca County in Greater Poland Voivodeship, west-central Poland
- Kania, Kuyavian-Pomeranian Voivodeship, north-central Poland
- Kania, Pomeranian Voivodeship, northern Poland
- Kania, Koszalin County in West Pomeranian Voivodeship, north-western Poland
- Kania, Stargard County in West Pomeranian Voivodeship, north-western Poland

== Polish aircraft ==
- PZL Kania, a Polish follow-up to the Mil Mi-2 helicopter
- PZL S-4 Kania, a Polish trainer and glider towing aircraft of the 1950s
- PZL.56 Kania, a Polish pre-war project of a fighter aircraft

== Other ==
- Kania (plant), a genus of plants native to New Guinea and Philippines
- Kania (surname)

== See also ==
- Kania Mała, a village in Gmina Chociwel, Stargard County, West Pomeranian Voivodeship, north-western Poland
- Kania Nowa, a village in Gmina Serock, Legionowo County, Masovian Voivodeship, east-central Poland
- Kania Polska, a village in Gmina Serock, Legionowo County, Masovian Voivodeship, east-central Poland
- Ostrów-Kania, a village in Gmina Dębe Wielkie, Mińsk County, Masovian Voivodeship, east-central Poland
