= List of municipal flags in the West Pomeranian Voivodeship =

The following list includes flags of municipalities (gminy) in the West Pomeranian Voivodeship, Poland.

Flag of the West Pomeranian Voivodeship

According to the definition, a flag is a sheet of fabric of a specific shape, colour and meaning, attached to a spar or mast. It may also include the coat of arms or emblem of the administrative unit concerned. In Poland, territorial units (municipal, city and county councils) may establish flags in accordance with the Act of 21 December 1978 on badges and uniforms. In its original version, it only allowed territorial units to establish coats of arms. Despite that many cities and municipalities adopted resolutions and used a flag as their symbol. It was not until the Act of 29 December 1998 amending certain acts in connection with the implementation of the state system reform that the right of voivodeships, counties and municipalities to establish this symbol of a territorial unit was officially confirmed.

In 2024, 73 of the 113 municipalities in the West Pomeranian Voivodeship have their own flag. This symbol, since 2000, has been established by the voivodeship itself.

== List ==
=== Białogard County ===
| Municipality | Flag | Description |
|---|---|---|
| City of Białogard | | The city flag was established by Resolution No. XVI/147/04 of 3 March 2004. It is a rectangular flag with proportions of 5:8, divided into three horizontal stripes: two white and one blue (symbolizing the Parsęta river) in the ratio of 2:1:2. On the left side of the flag there are two red rhombuses, referring to the city's membership in the Hanseatic League. |
| Gmina Białogard | | The municipal flag was established by Resolution No. L/247/02 of 9 October 2002. It is a rectangular flag with proportions of 5:8, divided into three vertical stripes: two blue and one yellow in the ratio of 1:3:1. In the central part of the flag the municipal coat of arms is placed. |
| City and gmina Karlino | | The first version of the municipal flag was established in December 1997, while the current one was established by Resolution No. XXXVII/379/21 of 27 August 2021. It is a rectangular flag with proportions of 5:8, divided into two equal horizontal stripes: blue and red. In the central part of the flag is the municipal coat of arms. |

=== Choszczno County ===
| Municipality | Flag | Description |
|---|---|---|
| City and gmina Choszczno | | The flag of the municipality was established on 26 June 1993. It is a rectangular flag with proportions of 2:3, divided into three equal horizontal stripes: white, red and green. In the central part, the municipal coat of arms is placed. |
| City and gmina Drawno | | The municipality's flag was established by Resolution No. XXXV/220/13 of 14 November 2013. It is a rectangular flag with proportions of 5:8, divided into two equal vertical stripes: yellow and blue. The flag features symbols from the municipal coat of arms. |
| Gmina Krzęcin | | The municipal flag was established by Resolution No. XXXV/172/2006 of 14 June 2006. It is a rectangular flag with proportions of 5:8, divided into three equal horizontal stripes: red, yellow and green. In the central part of the flag is the municipal coat of arms. |
| City and gmina Pełczyce | | The municipal flag was established on 23 June 1995. It is a rectangular flag, divided into three equal horizontal stripes: black, green and white. In the central part of the flag is the municipal coat of arms. |
| City and gmina Recz | | The municipal flag was established by Resolution No. V/35/03 of 28 February 2003. It is a rectangular flag, in the proportions of 5:8, yellow in colour, in the central part of the flag the coat of arms of the municipality is placed, and underneath it a blue horizontal wavy line, 1/8th of the width of the coat of arms, symbolising the Ina River. |

=== Drawsko County ===
| Municipality | Flag | Description |
|---|---|---|
| City and gmina Czaplinek | | The municipal flag was established on 2 July 1990, again on 27 November 1996; the final version, designed by Alfred Znamierowski and Jerzy Jan Nałęcz, by virtue of the resolution No. XXX/236/05 of 30 June 2005. It is a rectangular flag with proportions of 5:8, divided into three vertical stripes: yellow, blue and white in the ratio of 2:1:2. In the central part the flag the municipal coat of arms may be placed. |
| City and gmina Drawsko Pomorskie | | The municipal flag was established by Resolution No. VI/30/2003 of 28 February 2003. It is a rectangular flag with proportions of 5:8, divided into three equal horizontal stripes: red, white and blue. In the upper left corner of the flag is the municipal coat of arms. |
| City and gmina Kalisz Pomorski | | The municipal flag was established by means of Resolution No. XXXVIII/281/02 of 5 September 2002. It is a rectangular flag with proportions 5:8, divided into three vertical stripes: blue, white and green in the ratio of 1:2:1. In the central part of the flag is an emblem from the municipal coat of arms. |
| Gmina Wierzchowo | | The municipal flag was established by Resolution No. XII/71/99 of 15 September 1999. It is a rectangular flag with proportions 5:8, divided into three vertical stripes: yellow, red and green in the ratio of 1:2:1. In the central part the municipal coat of arms is placed. |
| City and gmina Złocieniec | | The municipal flag was established by Resolution No. XVI/148/2004 of 31 March 2004. It is a rectangular flag with proportions of 5:8, divided into three vertical stripes: blue, yellow and red in the ratio of 1:2:1. In the central part of the flag the municipal coat of arms is placed. |

=== Goleniów County ===
| Municipality | Flag | Description |
|---|---|---|
| City and gmina Goleniów | | The municipality's flag was established by Resolution No. II-263-96 of 16 February 1996. It is a rectangular flag with proportions of 5:8, dark blue in colour, in the upper left corner of the flag the emblem from the municipal coat of arms is placed. |
| Miasto i gmina Maszewo | | The municipal flag is a rectangular flag, divided into two equal horizontal stripes: white and red. To the left of the flag is the municipal coat of arms. |

=== Gryfice County ===
| Municipality | Flag | Description |
|---|---|---|
| City and gmina Gryfice | | The current version of the municipal flag was established by Resolution No. XXII/180/2004 of 7 December 2004. It is a rectangular flag with proportions of 5:8, divided into two equal horizontal stripes: yellow and red. In the central part of the flag is the municipal coat of arms. |
| Gmina Rewal | | The municipal flag was established by Resolution No. XXVIII/220/12 of 18 October 2012. It is a rectangular flag with proportions of 5:8, divided into five horizontal stripes: two red, two white and one blue in the ratio of 1:1:6:1:1. In the central part of the flag the municipal coat of arms is placed. |

=== Gryfino County ===
| Municipality | Flag | Description |
|---|---|---|
| Gmina Banie | | The flag of the municipality was established by Resolution No. XIII/125/2016 of 15 June 2016. It is a rectangular flag with proportions of 5:8, divided into three triangles: blue, white and red. On the left side of the flag, the municipal coat of arms is placed. |
| City and gmina Gryfino | | The municipal flag was established by Resolution No. XXV/264/96 of 26 September 1996. It is a rectangular flag with proportions of 2:3, blue in colour, in the central part of the flag the municipal coat of arms is placed. |
| City iand gmina Mieszkowice | | The municipal flag was established before 1999. It is a rectangular flag with proportions 5:8, divided into two equal horizontal stripes: white and red. In the central part of the flag the municipal coat of arms is placed, with the black inscription ‘MIESZKOWICE’ above it. |
| Gmina Stare Czarnowo | | The municipal flag was established by Resolution No. XV/111/2020 of 25 February 2020. It is a rectangular flag with proportions of 5:8, divided into three vertical stripes: two blue and one yellow in the ratio of 3:14:3. In the central part of the flag the municipal coat of arms is placed. |
| Gmina Widuchowa | | The flag of the municipality is a rectangular flag, in the proportions of 1:2 blue in colour, in the central part of the flag are placed six white wavy lines and on the left side of the patch, the figure of a white swan in a yellow circle. |

=== Kamień County ===
| Municipality | Flag | Description |
|---|---|---|
| City and gmina Dziwnów | | The municipal flag was established by Resolution No. XVII/195/2004 of 22 June 2004. It is a rectangular flag with proportions of 5:8, divided into three vertical stripes: blue, white and yellow in the ratio of 1:2:1. In the central part of the flag the municipal coat of arms is placed. |
| City and gmina Golczewo | | The municipal flag was established by Resolution No. XXXIII/282/10 of 26 March 2010. It is a rectangular flag with proportions of 5:8, divided into three vertical stripes: two green and one white in the ratio of 3:10:3. In the central part of the flag the municipal coat of arms is placed. |
| City and gmina Wolin | | The municipal flag is a white rectangular flag, in the central part of the flag the emblem from the municipal coat of arms is placed. |

=== Kołobrzeg County ===
| Municipality | Flag | Description |
|---|---|---|
| Gmina Dygowo | | The municipal flag was established by Resolution No. XIX/161/01 of 20 February 2001. It is a rectangular flag with proportions of 5:8, divided into three equal horizontal stripes: green, yellow and blue. In the central part aof the flag are two oak leaves with an acorn, taken from the municipal coat of arms. |
| City and gmina Gościno | | The municipal flag was established by Resolution No. XVII/89/96 of 15 February 1996. It is a rectangular flag with proportions of 5:8, divided into three equal horizontal stripes: gold, silver and red. In the central part of the flag may be placed the municipal coat of arms. |
| City of Kołobrzeg | | The city flag was established by Resolution No. XLII/585/10 of 23 February 2010. It is a rectangular flag with proportions of 5:8, divided into four horizontal stripes: white, blue, white and red in the ratio of 4:1:1:4. In the central part of the flag the city coat of arms is placed. |
| Gmina Kołobrzeg | | The municipality's flag was established by Resolution No. IV/27/2007 of 11 January 2007. It is a rectangular flag with proportions of 5:8, divided into five horizontal stripes: red, white, blue, white and blue in the ratio of 6:1:1:1:1 (white and blue wavy stripes). On the left side of the flag, against a red background, is a rising sun (the waves and the sun are symbols from the municipal coat of arms). |
| Gmina Ustronie Morskie | | The municipality's flag is a rectangular flag with proportions of 5:8, divided into four equal horizontal stripes: red, yellow, blue and white. In the central part of the flag is the municipal coat of arms. |

=== City of Koszalin ===
| Flag | Municipality |
|---|---|
| | The city's flag was established by Resolution No. 4/59 of 10 February 1959. It is a rectangular flag with proportions of 5:8, divided into two equal horizontal stripes: white and blue. |

=== Koszalin County ===
| Municipality | Flag | Description |
|---|---|---|
| Gmina Będzino | | The municipal flag was established by Resolution No. XXIX/142/97 of 29 April 1997. It is a rectangular flag with proportions 5:8, divided into four horizontal stripes: black, yellow, blue and red in the ratio of 2:1:1:2. In its central part the flag the coat of arms may be displayed. |
| City and gmina Bobolice | | The municipality's flag is a rectangular flag with proportions of 5:8, divided into three equal vertical stripes: two red and one yellow. In the central part of the flag is the municipal coat of arms. |
| Gmina Manowo | | The municipal flag was established on 27 March 1996. It is a rectangular flag with proportions of 1:2,1, green in colour, in the central part of the flag the municipal coat of arms is placed. |
| City and gmina Sianów | | The municipal flag was established by Resolution No. XLVI/254/2001 of 28 December 2001. It is a rectangular flag with proportions of 5:8, divided into three vertical stripes: two white and ome red in the ratio of 1:2:1. In the central part of the flag is an emblem from the municipal coat of arms, with a blue wavy stripe underneath. |
| Gmina Świeszyno | | The flag of the municipality, designed by Kamil Wójcikowski and Robert Fidura, was established by Resolution No. IX/51/19 of 25 April 2019. It is a rectangular flag with proportions of 5:8, red in colour, in the central part of the flag the emblem from the municipal coat of arms is placed. |

=== Łobez County ===
| Municipality | Flag | Description |
|---|---|---|
| City and gmina Łobez | | The current version of the municipal flag was established by Resolution No. XXXIII/257/2017 of 31 August 2017. It is a rectangular flag with proportions of 5:8, divided into three equal horizontal stripes: red, yellow and green. |
| Gmina Radowo Małe | | The municipal flag, designed by Kamil Wójcikowski and Robert Fidura, was established by Resolution No. XXX/196/2022 of 12 May 2022. It is a rectangular flag with proportions of 5:8, divided into three horizontal stripes: red, yellow and blue in the ratio of 13:3:4. In the central part of the flag the municipal coat of arms is placed. |
| City and gmina Resko | | The municipal flag was established by Resolution No. XIX/143/96 of 17 May 1996. It is a rectangular flag with proportions of 5:8, divided into two equal horizontal stripes: yellow and blue. In the upper left corner of the flag there is the municipal coat of arms. |

=== Myślibórz County ===
| Municipality | Flag | Description |
|---|---|---|
| City and gmina Barlinek | | The municipal flag was established by Resolution No. XXVII/237/93 of 28 September 1993. It is a rectangular flag, divided into three equal vertical stripes: red, white and green. |
| City and gmina Dębno | | The municipal flag was established by Resolution No. XIII/83/99 of 29 July 1999. It is a rectangular flag with proportions 5:8, divided into three horizontal stripes: two yellow and one red in the ratio of 1:2:1. In the central part of the flag is an emblem from the municipal coat of arms. |

=== Police County ===
| Municipality | Flag | Description |
|---|---|---|
| Gmina Kołbaskowo | | The municipal flag was established by Resolution No. XIII/4/2000 of 19 May 2000. It is a rectangular flag with proportions of 5:8, divided into three vertical stripes: red, white and blue in the ratio of 1:2:1. In the central part of the flag the municipal coat of arms may be located. |
| City and gmina Police | | The municipal flag was established by Resolution No. XLVIII/330/94 of 18 March 1994. It is a rectangular flag with proportions of 5:8, divided into three horizontal stripes: red, gold and silver in the ratio of 2:1:2. In the central part of the upper stripe there may be the commune's coat of arms. |

=== Pyrzyce County ===
| Municipality | Flag | Description |
|---|---|---|
| Gmina Bielice | | The municipal flag was established by Resolution No. XXVIII/158/09 of 16 September 2009. It is a rectangular flag with proportions of 5:8, divided into three vertical stripes: two white and a red one in the ratio of 1:2:1. In the central part of the flag is the emblem from the municipal coat of arms. |
| City and gmina Lipiany | | The municipal flag was established by Resolution No. XXV/215/2013 of 25 June 2013. It is a rectangular flag with proportions of 5:8, divided into three vertical stripes: two blue and a white one in the ratio of 1:2:1. In the central part of the flag the municipal coat of arms is placed. |
| City and gmina Pyrzyce | | The municipal flag was confirmed by Resolution No. XXVII/201/20 of 24 September 2020. It is a rectangular flag with proportions of 5:8, ending in two triangular tongues, divided into three horizontal stripes: white, red and blue in the ratio of 2:1:1. In the central part of the upper stripe there is a figure of a red griffin from the municipal coat of arms. |
| Gmina Warnice | | The municipality's flag was established by Resolution No. XVII/107/2012 of 27 April 2012. It is a rectangular flag with proportions of 5:8, divided into two parts: left blue and right, divided into three equal horizontal stripes: red, yellow and violet. |

=== Sławno County ===
| Municipality | Flag | Description |
|---|---|---|
| Gmina Malechowo | | The municipal flag was established by Resolution No. XXX/212/2002 of 26 April 2002. It is a rectangular flag with proportions of 5:8, divided into two equal horizontal stripes: yellow and green. In the central part of the flag is the municipal coat of arms. |
| Gmina Sławno | | The flag of the municipality was established by Resolution No. XLII/383/2014 of 17 March 2014. It is a rectangular flag with proportions of 5:8, red in colour, in the upper left corner of the flag the emblem from the municipal coat of arms is placed, and underneath it along the entire length of the flag a silver wavy line. |

=== Stargard County ===
| Municipality | Flag | Description |
|---|---|---|
| City and gmina Dobrzany | | The municipal flag was established by Resolution No. XXII/196/12 of 11 November 2012. It is a rectangular flag with proportions of 5:8, divided into five horizontal stripes: blue, white, red, white and blue in the ratio of 1:1:6:1:1. In the central part of the flag the municipal coat of arms is placed. |
| Gmina Dolice | | The flag of the municipality, by Janusz Gajowniczek, was established on 25 April 1997. It is a rectangular flag, divided into two equal horizontal stripes: silver and green. |
| City and gmina Ińsko | | The municipal flag was established by Resolution No. XXXI/289/2009 of 30 December 2009. It is a rectangular flag with proportions of 5:8, divided into four horizontal stripes: green, white, red and blue in the ratio of 2:1:1:2. In the central part of the flag the municipal coat of arms is placed. |
| Gmina Kobylanka | | The municipal flag was established by Resolution No. XXXI/289/2009 of 30 December 2009. It is a rectangular flag with proportions of 5:8, divided into four equal horizontal stripes: yellow, blue, white and green. On the left-hand side of the patch may be the municipal coat of arms. |
| Gmina Marianowo | | The flag of the municipality was established by Resolution No. XXXV/236/2018 of 7 June 2018. It is a rectangular flag with proportions of 5:8, white in colour, with the symbols from the municipal coat of arms on the left side of the flag and a blue wavy line between them along the entire length of the flag. |
| City of Stargard | | The city flag, designed by Piotr Kosmal, was established by Resolution No. XVI/167/07 of 18 December 2007. It is a rectangular flag with proportions of 2:5, divided into five horizontal stripes: blue, red, white and red. On the left side of the flag is the town's coat of arms. |
| Gmina Stargard | | The municipal flag, designed by Alfred Znamierowski, was established by Resolution No. XXXII/282/21 of 19 November 2021. It is a rectangular flag with proportions of 5:8, divided into two wavy horizontal stripes: red and blue in the ratio of 3:1. In the upper left corner of the flag there is a Maltese cross, an emblem from the municipal coat of arms, on the bottom part of the flag is a blue way line which is also an emblem from the municipal coat of arms. |

=== City of Szczecin ===
| Flag | Description |
|---|---|
| | The city's flag was established by Resolution No. XXVIII/360/96 of 2 December 1996. It is a rectangular flag with proportions of 1:2, divided into six equal red and blue stripes. To the left of the stripes is the city's coat of arms. |

=== Szczecineck County ===
| Municipality | Flag | Description |
|---|---|---|
| City and gmina Barwice | | The municipal flag was established by Resolution No. XXIX/173/93 of 28 September 1993. It is a rectangular flag with proportions of 5:8, divided into eight horizontal stripes: white, green, white, green, white, green, black and green in the ratio of 21:2:1:3:1:3:1:3. In the upper right corner of the flag the municipal coat of arms is placed. |
| City and gmina Biały Bór | | The municipal flag is a rectangular flag with proportions of 5:8, divided into three horizontal stripes: green, white and blue. In the central part of the flag is the municipal coat of arms. |
| City and gmina Borne Sulinowo | | The municipal flag was established by Resolution No. XXI/268/96 of 27 March 1996. It is a rectangular flag with proportions of 5:8, divided into three equal horizontal stripes: green, white and blue. In the upper left corner of the flag is the municipal coat of arms and 21 flowers in two rows, symbolising the villages and settlements of the municipality. |
| City of Szczecinek | | The city's flag is a rectangular flag with proportions of 1:2, divided into three horizontal stripes: two green and a white one in the ratio of 3:8:3. In the central part of the flag the city's coat of arms is placed. |
| Gmina Szczecinek | | The municipal flag was established by Resolution No. VII/50/2003 of 31 March 2003. It is a rectangular flag with proportions of 5:8, divided from left to right with a yellow stripe into two parts: the upper green and the lower blue. In the central part of the flag may appear the municipal coat of arms. |

=== Świdwiń County ===
| Municipality | Flag | Description |
|---|---|---|
| Gmina Brzeżno | | The flag of the municipality was established by Resolution No. XIII/68/2016 of 29 January 2016. It is a rectangular flag with proportions of 5:8, divided into two parts: the left one, blue, with the emblem from the municipal coat of arms on the left and the right one, divided into seven equal horizontal stripes: four blue and three white. |
| City and gmina Połczyn-Zdrój | | The municipality's flag, designed by Marian Czerner, was established on 30 November 1994. It is a rectangular flag with proportions of 5:8, divided in a chequered pattern into four parts: two blue and two silver with red rhombuses (the canton is blue). |
| Gmina Sławoborze | | The municipal flag is a rectangular flag with a gold border, divided into two parts: the left one is white, with the municipal coat of arms surrounded by a green border, and the right one is divided into three equal horizontal stripes: gold, blue (both with a green border) and green with a gold border. |
| City of Świdwin | | The city's flag is a rectangular flag with a ratio of 3:5, white in colour, in the lower part of which is placed a red wall with five battlements. |
| Gmina Świdwin | | The municipal flag is a rectangular flag with proportions of 5:8, divided into three horizontal stripes: two white and one red in the ratio of 1:2:1. In the central part of the flag the municipal coat of arms may be present. |

=== City of Świnoujście ===
| Flag | Description |
|---|---|
| | The city's flag was established on 20 August 1996. It is a rectangular flag with proportions of 2:3, divided into two parts in a ratio of 4:1: the upper one, dark blue, with the emblem from the city's coat of arms, and the lower one, divided into three horizontal stripes: white, red and dark blue in a ratio of 1:1:3. |

=== Wałcz County ===
| Municipality | Flag | Description |
|---|---|---|
| City and gmina Człopa | | The municipality's flag is a rectangular flag with proportions of 5:8, divided into two parts: the left, white in colour, with the emblem from the municipality's coat of arms and the right, divided into six equal horizontal stripes: three yellow and three red. |
| City and gmina Mirosławiec | | The municipality's flag was established on 16 February 1996, again by Resolution No. VII/55/2003 of 30 May 2003. It is a rectangular flag with proportions of 2:3, divided in a chequered pattern into four parts: two blue and two red (the canton is blue). |
| City and gmina Tuczno | | The municipality's flag was established by Resolution No. XVI/93/2012 of 25 April 2012. It is a rectangular flag with proportions 5:8, blue in colour, in the central part of the flag there are two stripes from left to right in a white and red chequered pattern. |
| City of Wałcz | | The current version of the city's flag was established by Resolution No. VI/SXXXIX/228/13 of 17 September 2013, again by Resolution No. VIII/IV/48/19 of 26 February 2019. It is a rectangular flag with proportions of 5:8, blue in colour, in the central part of the flag the emblem from the city's coat of arms is placed. |
| Gmina Wałcz | | The municipality's flag is a rectangular flag with proportions of 5:8, divided into two equal vertical stripes: gold and blue. |
