= Długie =

Długie may refer to:

- Długie, Włocławek County in Kuyavian-Pomeranian Voivodeship (north-central Poland)
- Długie, Rypin County in Kuyavian-Pomeranian Voivodeship (north-central Poland)
- Długie, Podlaskie Voivodeship (north-east Poland)
- Długie, Łódź East County in Łódź Voivodeship (central Poland)
- Długie, Radomsko County in Łódź Voivodeship (central Poland)
- Długie, Lublin County in Lublin Voivodeship (east Poland)
- Długie, Gmina Tomaszów Lubelski, Tomaszów County in Lublin Voivodeship (east Poland)
- Długie, Gmina Jedlicze, Krosno County in Subcarpathian Voivodeship (south-east Poland)
- Długie, Sanok County in Subcarpathian Voivodeship (south-east Poland)
- Długie, Ostrołęka County in Masovian Voivodeship (east-central Poland)
- Długie, Przysucha County in Masovian Voivodeship (east-central Poland)
- Długie, Greater Poland Voivodeship (west-central Poland)
- Długie, Strzelce-Drezdenko County in Lubusz Voivodeship (west Poland)
- Długie, Żagań County in Lubusz Voivodeship (west Poland)
- Długie, Pomeranian Voivodeship (north Poland)
- Długie, Warmian-Masurian Voivodeship (north Poland)
- Długie, Gryfino County in West Pomeranian Voivodeship (north-west Poland)
- Długie, Stargard County in West Pomeranian Voivodeship (north-west Poland)
