= Storkowo, Stargard County =

Storkowo
- Village
- Location within Poland
- Coordinates: 53°28′1″N 15°35′27″E
- Country: Poland
- Voivodeship: West Pomeranian
- County: Stargard
- Gmina: Ińsko
- Population: 316

Storkowo [stɔrˈkɔvɔ], (German: Alt Storkow) is a village in the administrative district of Gmina Ińsko, within Stargard County, West Pomeranian Voivodeship, in north-western Poland. It lies approximately 5 km (3 mi) north-east of Ińsko, 40 km (25 mi) east of Stargard, and 68 km (42 mi) east of the regional capital Szczecin.

The village has a population of 316.
