= Granica, West Pomeranian Voivodeship =

Granica
- Village
- Location within Poland
- Coordinates: 53°30′10″N 15°35′17″E
- Country: Poland
- Voivodeship: West Pomeranian
- County: Stargard
- Gmina: Ińsko
- Population: 72

Granica [ɡraˈnit͡sa], (German: Karlsthal) is a village in the administrative district of Gmina Ińsko, within Stargard County, West Pomeranian Voivodeship, in north-western Poland. It lies approximately 8 km (5 mi) north of Ińsko, 42 km (26 mi) north-east of Stargard, and 68 km (42 mi) east of the regional capital Szczecin.

The village has a population of 72.
