= Kamienny Most, West Pomeranian Voivodeship =

Kamienny Most
- Village
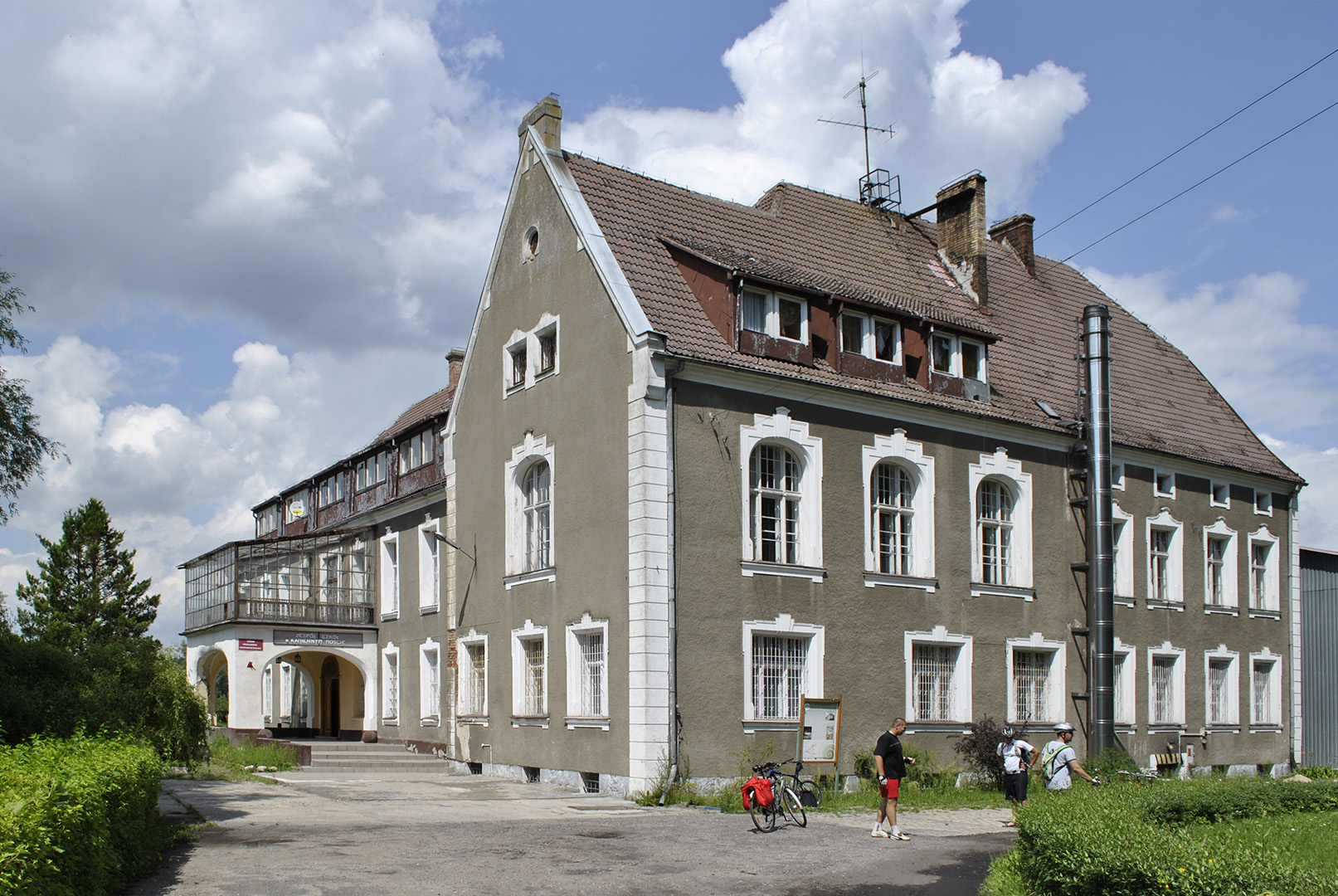
- School in Kamienny Most

- Location within Poland
- Coordinates: 53°27′26″N 15°22′56″E
- Country: Poland
- Voivodeship: West Pomeranian
- County: Stargard
- Gmina: Chociwel
- Population: 232
- Time zone: UTC+1 (CET)
  - Summer (DST): UTC+2 (CEST)
- Area code: +48 91
- Car plates: ZST

Kamienny Most [kaˈmjɛnnɨ ˈmɔst] (German: Steinhöfel) is a village in the administrative district of Gmina Chociwel, within Stargard County, West Pomeranian Voivodeship, in north-western Poland. It lies approximately 3 km (2 mi) east of Chociwel, 27 km (17 mi) north-east of Stargard, and 54 km (34 mi) east of the regional capital Szczecin.

It is located on the southern shore of Kamienny Most Lake in the Ińsko Landscape Park in the historic region of Pomerania.

The village has a population of 232.
