= Oświno =

Village in West Pomeranian Voivodeship, Poland

- Village
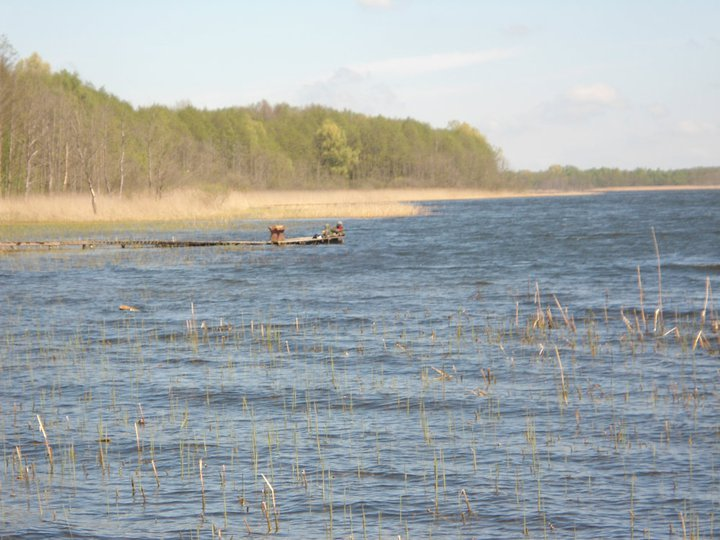
- Woświn lake as seen from Oświno, April 2011

- Location within Poland
- Coordinates: 53°31′57″N 15°23′19″E
- Country: Poland
- Voivodeship: West Pomeranian
- County: Stargard
- Gmina: Chociwel
- Population: 158
- Time zone: UTC+1 (CET)
  - Summer (DST): UTC+2 (CEST)
- Area code: +48 91
- Car plates: ZST

Oświno [ɔɕˈfinɔ] (German: Marienhagen) is a village in the administrative district of Gmina Chociwel, within Stargard County, West Pomeranian Voivodeship, in north-western Poland. It lies approximately 9 km (6 mi) north-east of Chociwel, 33 km (21 mi) north-east of Stargard, and 55 km (34 mi) east of the regional capital Szczecin. It is situated on the western shore of Woświn lake, in the historic region of Pomerania.

The village has a population of 158.
