= Gronówko =

Gronówko may refer to the following places:

- Gronówko, Greater Poland Voivodeship (west-central Poland)
- Gronówko, Warmian-Masurian Voivodeship (north Poland)
- Gronówko, West Pomeranian Voivodeship (north-west Poland)
