= Powalice, Stargard County =

Powalice
- Village
- Location within Poland
- Coordinates: 53°26′20″N 15°28′6″E
- Country: Poland
- Voivodeship: West Pomeranian
- County: Stargard
- Gmina: Ińsko
- Population: 3

Powalice [pɔvaˈlit͡sɛ] (German: Karlshof) is a village in the administrative district of Gmina Ińsko, within Stargard County, West Pomeranian Voivodeship, in north-western Poland. It lies approximately 6 km (4 mi) west of Ińsko, 32 km (20 mi) east of Stargard, and 59 km (37 mi) east of the regional capital Szczecin.

The village has a population of 3.
