= Bród, West Pomeranian Voivodeship =

Bród
- Village
- Location within Poland
- Coordinates: 53°30′48″N 15°20′43″E
- Country: Poland
- Voivodeship: West Pomeranian
- County: Stargard
- Gmina: Chociwel
- Population: 211
- Time zone: UTC+1 (CET)
  - Summer (DST): UTC+2 (CEST)
- Area code: +48 91
- Car plates: ZST

Bród [brut] is a village in the administrative district of Gmina Chociwel, within Stargard County, West Pomeranian Voivodeship, in north-western Poland. It lies approximately 6 km (4 mi) north of Chociwel, 29 km (18 mi) north-east of Stargard, and 52 km (32 mi) east of the regional capital Szczecin. It is located in the historic region of Pomerania.

The village has a population of 211.

The Church of the Apostles St Peter and Paul was dedicated on 29 June 1947.
