= Sierakowo, Stargard County =

Sierakowo
- Village
- Location within Poland
- Coordinates: 53°18′N 15°25′E
- Country: Poland
- Voivodeship: West Pomeranian
- County: Stargard
- Gmina: Dobrzany

Sierakowo [ɕɛraˈkɔvɔ] (German Altheide) is a village in the administrative district of Gmina Dobrzany, within Stargard County, West Pomeranian Voivodeship, in north-western Poland. It lies approximately 7 km (4 mi) south of Dobrzany, 26 km (16 mi) east of Stargard, and 57 km (35 mi) east of the regional capital Szczecin.
