= Starzyce, Stargard County =

Starzyce
- Village
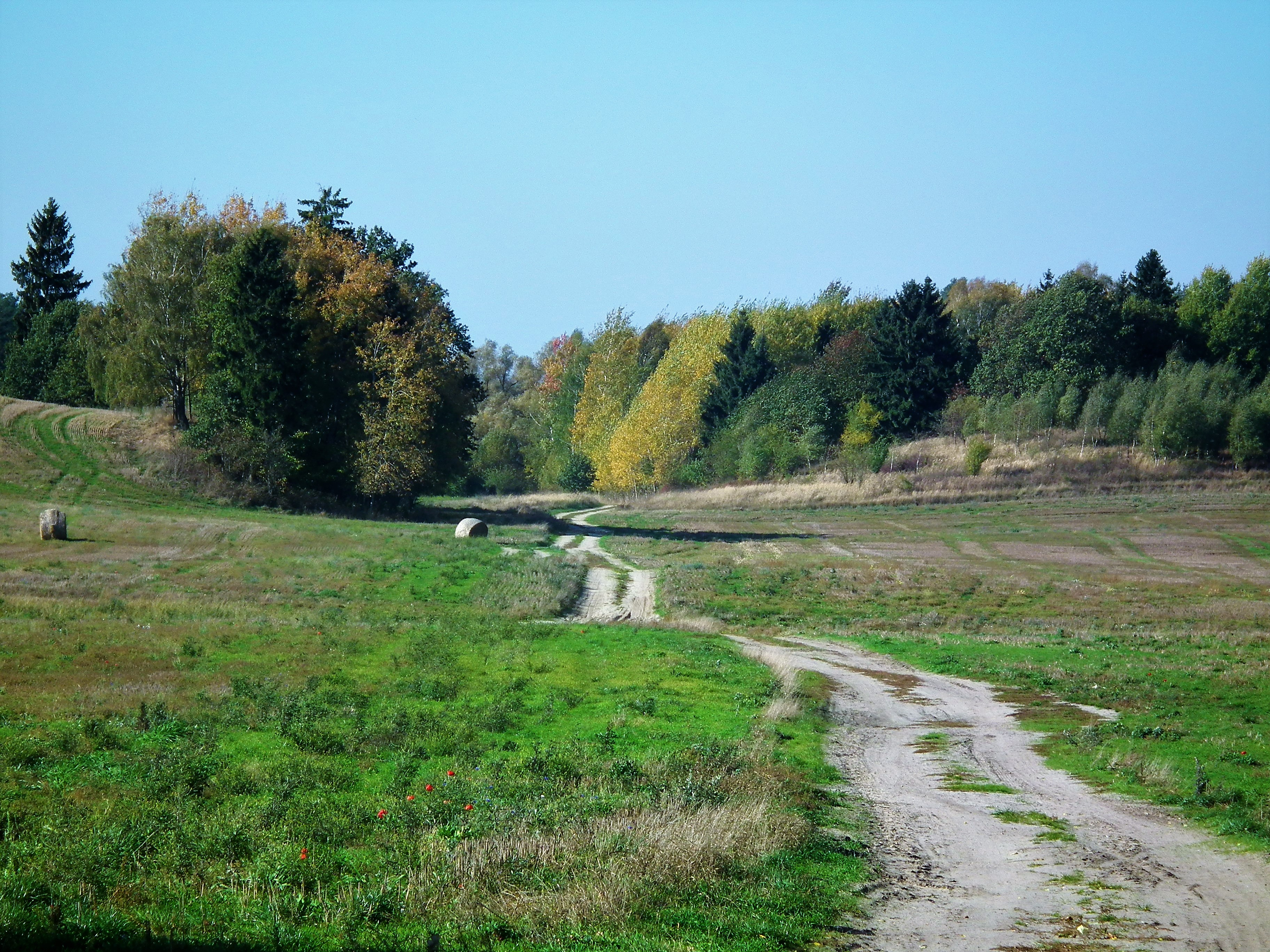

- Location within Poland
- Coordinates: 53°26′15″N 15°21′17″E
- Country: Poland
- Voivodeship: West Pomeranian
- County: Stargard
- Gmina: Chociwel
- Population: 352
- Time zone: UTC+1 (CET)
  - Summer (DST): UTC+2 (CEST)
- Area code: +48 91
- Car plates: ZST

Starzyce [staˈʐɨt͡sɛ] is a village in the administrative district of Gmina Chociwel, within Stargard County, West Pomeranian Voivodeship, in north-western Poland. It lies approximately 4 km (2 mi) south of Chociwel, 25 km (16 mi) north-east of Stargard, and 52 km (32 mi) east of the regional capital Szczecin. It is located in the historic region of Pomerania.

The village has a population of 352.
