= Waliszewo, Stargard County =

Waliszewo
- Village
- Location within Poland
- Coordinates: 53°28′38″N 15°36′14″E
- Country: Poland
- Voivodeship: West Pomeranian
- County: Stargard
- Gmina: Ińsko
- Population: 49

Waliszewo [valiˈʂɛvɔ] (German: Margarethenhof) is a village in the administrative district of Gmina Ińsko, within Stargard County, West Pomeranian Voivodeship, in north-western Poland. It lies approximately 6 km (4 mi) north-east of Ińsko, 42 km (26 mi) north-east of Stargard, and 68 km (42 mi) east of the regional capital Szczecin.

For the history of the region, see History of Pomerania.

The village has a population of 49.
