= Jakub Kania =

Jakub Kania may refer to:

- Jakub Kania (poet) (1872–1957)
- Jakub Kania (ice hockey), born 1990
