= Sątyrz Drugi =

- Settlement
- Location within Poland
- Coordinates: 53°29′52″N 15°26′34″E
- Country: Poland
- Voivodeship: West Pomeranian
- County: Stargard
- Gmina: Chociwel
- Area code: +48 91
- Car plates: ZST

Sątyrz Drugi [ˈsɔntɨʂ ˈdruɡi] is a settlement in the administrative district of Gmina Chociwel, within Stargard County, West Pomeranian Voivodeship, in north-western Poland. It lies approximately 8 km (5 mi) north-east of Chociwel, 33 km (21 mi) north-east of Stargard, and 58 km (36 mi) east of the regional capital Szczecin.
