= Wierzchucice, West Pomeranian Voivodeship =

Wierzchucice
- Village
- Location within Poland
- Coordinates: 53°28′18″N 15°32′18″E
- Country: Poland
- Voivodeship: West Pomeranian
- County: Stargard
- Gmina: Ińsko
- Population: 1

Wierzchucice [vjɛʂxuˈt͡ɕit͡sɛ] (German: Friedrichsfeld) is a village in the administrative district of Gmina Ińsko, within Stargard County, West Pomeranian Voivodeship, in north-western Poland. It lies approximately 4 km (2 mi) north of Ińsko, 37 km (23 mi) north-east of Stargard, and 64 km (40 mi) east of the regional capital Szczecin.

The village has a population of 1.
