= Lisowo, Stargard County =

Lisowo
- Village
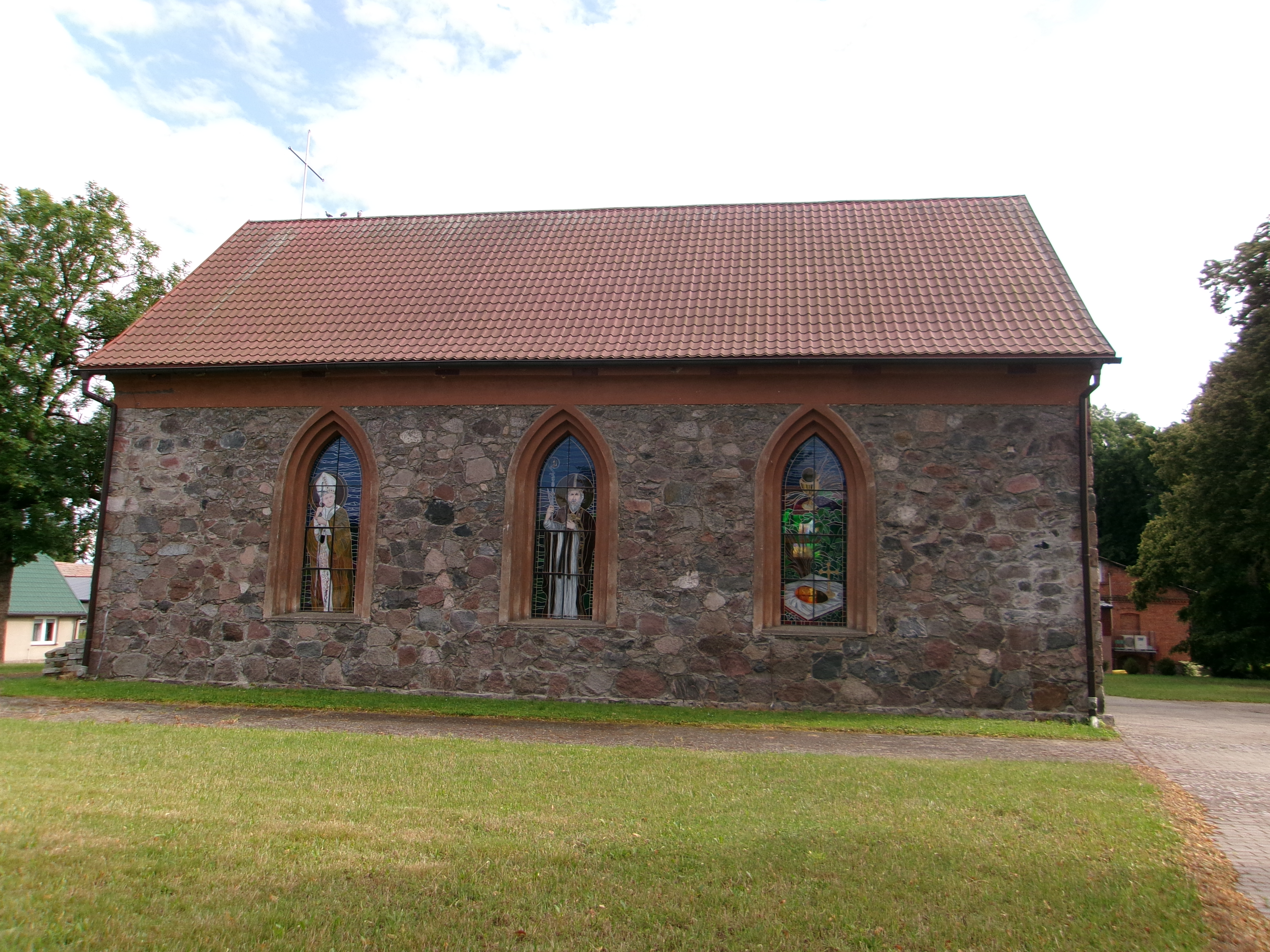
- Our Lady of Częstochowa church in Lisowo

- Location within Poland
- Coordinates: 53°25′39″N 15°18′13″E
- Country: Poland
- Voivodeship: West Pomeranian
- County: Stargard
- Gmina: Chociwel

Population
  - Total: 344
- Time zone: UTC+1 (CET)
  - Summer (DST): UTC+2 (CEST)
- Area code: +48 91
- Vehicle registration: ZST

Lisowo [liˈsɔvɔ] (formerly German: Vossberg) is a village in the administrative district of Gmina Chociwel, within Stargard County, West Pomeranian Voivodeship, in north-western Poland. It lies approximately 5 km (3 mi) south-west of Chociwel, 21 km (13 mi) north-east of Stargard, and 48 km (30 mi) east of the regional capital Szczecin.

The village has a population of 344.

There is a church of Our Lady of Częstochowa in the village.

== History ==
During World War II, on 4 February 1945, the village was the site of a stopover during the German-organised march of some 6,000 Polish prisoners of war from the Oflag II-D camp headed westwards.
