= Linówko =

- Village
- Location within Poland
- Coordinates: 53°25′29″N 15°28′17″E
- Country: Poland
- Voivodeship: West Pomeranian
- County: Stargard
- Gmina: Ińsko
- Population: 161

Linówko [liˈnufkɔ] (German: Klein Lienichen) is a village in the administrative district of Gmina Ińsko, within Stargard County, West Pomeranian Voivodeship, in north-western Poland. It lies approximately 6 km (4 mi) west of Ińsko, 31 km (19 mi) east of Stargard, and 59 km (37 mi) east of the regional capital Szczecin.
