= Ciemnik =

- Village
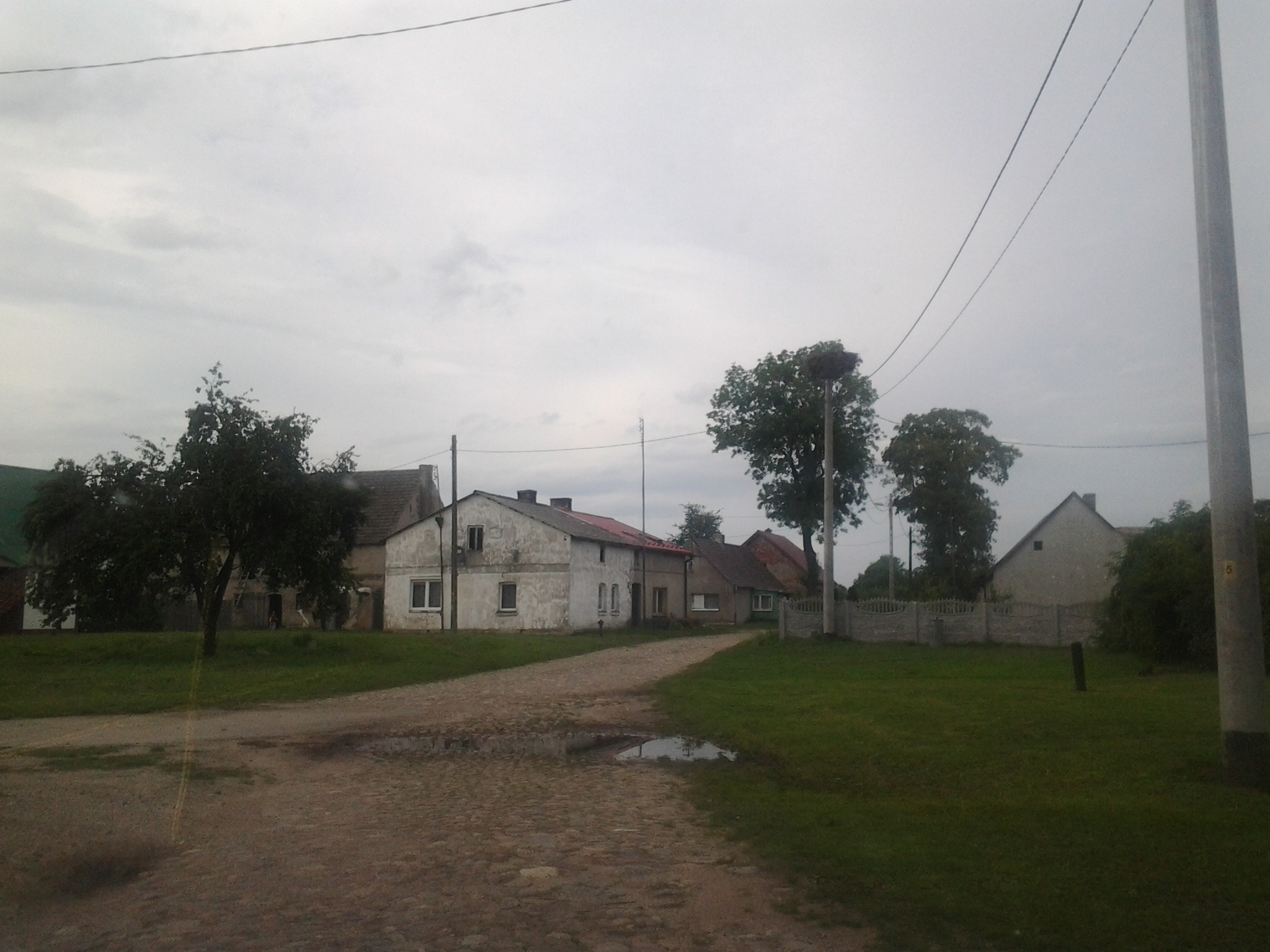

- Location within Poland
- Coordinates: 53°23′53″N 15°34′18″E
- Country: Poland
- Voivodeship: West Pomeranian
- County: Stargard
- Gmina: Ińsko

Population
  - Total: 264
- Time zone: UTC+1 (CET)
  - Summer (DST): UTC+2 (CEST)
- Vehicle registration: ZST

Ciemnik [ˈt͡ɕɛmnik] is a village in the administrative district of Gmina Ińsko, within Stargard County, West Pomeranian Voivodeship, in north-western Poland. It lies approximately 5 km (3 mi) south of Ińsko, 37 km (23 mi) east of Stargard, and 66 km (41 mi) east of the regional capital Szczecin.

The village has a population of 264.

During World War II, the Germans operated a forced labour subcamp of the Stalag II-D prisoner-of-war camp in the village.
