= Okole =

Okole may refer to the places in Poland:

- Okole, Kuyavian-Pomeranian Voivodeship (north-central Poland)
- Okole, Pomeranian Voivodeship (north Poland)
- Okole, Stargard County in West Pomeranian Voivodeship (north-west Poland)
- Okole, Szczecinek County in West Pomeranian Voivodeship (north-west Poland)
- Okole (mountain)
