= Spławie, Stargard County =

Spławie
- Village
- Location within Poland
- Coordinates: 53°27′22″N 15°17′34″E
- Country: Poland
- Voivodeship: West Pomeranian
- County: Stargard
- Gmina: Chociwel
- Village: Karkowo
- Time zone: UTC+1 (CET)
  - Summer (DST): UTC+2 (CEST)
- Postal code: 73-120
- Area code: +48 91
- Car plates: ZST

Spławie [ˈspwavjɛ] is a village in the administrative district of Gmina Chociwel, within Stargard County, West Pomeranian Voivodeship, in north-western Poland.
