= Sątyrz Pierwszy =

- Village
- Location within Poland
- Coordinates: 53°28′49″N 15°26′38″E
- Country: Poland
- Voivodeship: West Pomeranian
- County: Stargard
- Gmina: Chociwel
- Population: 27
- Time zone: UTC+1 (CET)
  - Summer (DST): UTC+2 (CEST)
- Area code: +48 91
- Car plates: ZST

Sątyrz Pierwszy [ˈsɔntɨʂ ˈpjɛrfʂɨ] (German: Sadelberg) is a village in the administrative district of Gmina Chociwel, within Stargard County, West Pomeranian Voivodeship, in north-western Poland. It lies approximately 8 km (5 mi) east of Chociwel, 32 km (20 mi) north-east of Stargard, and 58 km (36 mi) east of the regional capital Szczecin. It is located in the historic region of Pomerania.

The village has a population of 27.
