= Wieleń Pomorski =

- Village
- Location within Poland
- Coordinates: 53°30′15″N 15°23′37″E
- Country: Poland
- Voivodeship: West Pomeranian
- County: Stargard
- Gmina: Chociwel
- Population: 106
- Time zone: UTC+1 (CET)
  - Summer (DST): UTC+2 (CEST)
- Area code: +48 91
- Car plates: ZST

Wieleń Pomorski [ˈvjɛlɛɲ pɔˈmɔrski] (German: Vehlingsdorf) is a village in the administrative district of Gmina Chociwel, within Stargard County, West Pomeranian Voivodeship, in north-western Poland. It lies approximately 6 km (4 mi) north-east of Chociwel, 31 km (19 mi) north-east of Stargard, and 55 km (34 mi) east of the regional capital Szczecin. It is located in the historic region of Pomerania.

The village has a population of 106.
