= Nierybno, Stargard County =

Nierybno
- Village
- Location within Poland
- Coordinates: 53°28′18″N 15°38′59″E
- Country: Poland
- Voivodeship: West Pomeranian
- County: Stargard
- Gmina: Ińsko
- Population: 19

Nierybno [ɲɛˈrɨbnɔ] is a village in the administrative district of Gmina Ińsko, within Stargard County, West Pomeranian Voivodeship, in north-western Poland. It lies approximately 8 km (5 mi) north-east of Ińsko, 44 km (27 mi) east of Stargard, and 71 km (44 mi) east of the regional capital Szczecin.

The village has a population of 19.
