= Mokrzyca, West Pomeranian Voivodeship =

Mokrzyca
- Settlement
- Location within Poland
- Coordinates: 53°29′57″N 15°18′7″E
- Country: Poland
- Voivodeship: West Pomeranian
- County: Stargard
- Gmina: Chociwel
- Population: 53
- Time zone: UTC+1 (CET)
  - Summer (DST): UTC+2 (CEST)
- Area code: +48 91
- Car plates: ZST

Mokrzyca [mɔˈkʂɨt͡sa] (formerly German Albertinenhof) is a settlement in the administrative district of Gmina Chociwel, within Stargard County, West Pomeranian Voivodeship, in north-western Poland. It lies approximately 5 km (3 mi) north-west of Chociwel, 26 km (16 mi) north-east of Stargard, and 49 km (30 mi) east of the regional capital Szczecin.

The settlement has a population of 53.

For the history of the region, see History of Pomerania.
