= Zabrodzie, West Pomeranian Voivodeship =

Zabrodzie
- Village
- Location within Poland
- Coordinates: 53°31′22″N 15°21′8″E
- Country: Poland
- Voivodeship: West Pomeranian
- County: Stargard
- Gmina: Chociwel
- Population: 33
- Time zone: UTC+1 (CET)
  - Summer (DST): UTC+2 (CEST)
- Area code: +48 91
- Car plates: ZST

Zabrodzie [zaˈbrɔd͡ʑɛ] is a village in the administrative district of Gmina Chociwel, within Stargard County, West Pomeranian Voivodeship, in north-western Poland. It lies approximately 7 km (4 mi) north of Chociwel, 30 km (19 mi) north-east of Stargard, and 53 km (33 mi) east of the regional capital Szczecin.

The village has a population of 33.
