= Ognica, Stargard County =

Ognica
- Village
- Location within Poland
- Coordinates: 53°19′37″N 15°26′26″E
- Country: Poland
- Voivodeship: West Pomeranian
- County: Stargard
- Gmina: Dobrzany
- Population: 200

Ognica [ɔɡˈnit͡sa] (German Stolzenhagen) is a village in the administrative district of Gmina Dobrzany, within Stargard County, West Pomeranian Voivodeship, in north-western Poland. It lies approximately 4 km (2 mi) south of Dobrzany, 28 km (17 mi) east of Stargard, and 58 km (36 mi) east of the regional capital Szczecin.

The village has a population of 200.
