= Bobrowniki, West Pomeranian Voivodeship =

Bobrowniki
- Village
- Location within Poland
- Coordinates: 53°26′12″N 15°15′10″E
- Country: Poland
- Voivodeship: West Pomeranian
- County: Stargard
- Gmina: Chociwel

Population
  - Total: 231
- Time zone: UTC+1 (CET)
  - Summer (DST): UTC+2 (CEST)
- Area code: +48 91
- Car plates: ZST

Bobrowniki [bɔbrɔvˈniki] is a village in the administrative district of Gmina Chociwel, within Stargard County, West Pomeranian Voivodeship, in north-western Poland. It lies approximately 7 km (4 mi) south-west of Chociwel, 19 km (12 mi) north-east of Stargard, and 45 km (28 mi) east of the regional capital Szczecin. It is located in the historic region of Pomerania.

The village has a population of 231.

In the village there is a stone church of the Nativity of the Blessed Virgin Mary, dating back to the 15th century.

Four Polish citizens were murdered by Nazi Germany in the village during World War II.

== Transport ==
The Voivodeship road 142 runs south of the village, and its intersection with National road 20 is located east of the village.
