= Odargowo, West Pomeranian Voivodeship =

Odargowo
- Village
- Location within Poland
- Coordinates: 53°20′30″N 15°21′33″E
- Country: Poland
- Voivodeship: West Pomeranian
- County: Stargard
- Gmina: Dobrzany
- Time zone: UTC+1 (CET)
  - Summer (DST): UTC+2 (CEST)

Odargowo [ɔdarˈɡɔvɔ] is a village in the administrative district of Gmina Dobrzany, within Stargard County, West Pomeranian Voivodeship, in north-western Poland. It lies approximately 5 km (3 mi) south-west of Dobrzany, 22 km (14 mi) east of Stargard, and 53 km (33 mi) east of the regional capital Szczecin.

During World War II, the Germans operated a forced labour subcamp of the Stalag II-D prisoner-of-war camp in the village.
