= Hauenstein (surname) =

Hauenstein is a surname. Notable people with the surname include:

- Henry Hauenstein (1881–1940), Australian rower and World War I officer
- Ralph Hauenstein (1912–2016), American army officer, businessman, and philanthropist

== See also ==
- Havenstein
