= Ścienne =

- Village
- Location within Poland
- Coordinates: 53°27′31″N 15°27′56″E
- Country: Poland
- Voivodeship: West Pomeranian
- County: Stargard
- Gmina: Ińsko
- Population: 408

Ścienne [ˈɕt͡ɕɛnnɛ] (German: Zeinicke) is a village in the administrative district of Gmina Ińsko, within Stargard County, West Pomeranian Voivodeship, in north-western Poland. It lies approximately 7 km (4 mi) north-west of Ińsko, 32 km (20 mi) north-east of Stargard, and 59 km (37 mi) east of the regional capital Szczecin.

The village has a population of 408.
