= Lutkowo, West Pomeranian Voivodeship =

Lutkowo
- Village
- Location within Poland
- Coordinates: 53°23′54″N 15°22′1″E
- Country: Poland
- Voivodeship: West Pomeranian
- County: Stargard
- Gmina: Dobrzany

Lutkowo [lutˈkɔvɔ] (formerly German: Rehwinkel) is a village in the administrative district of Gmina Dobrzany, within Stargard County, West Pomeranian Voivodeship, in north-western Poland. It lies approximately 6 km (4 mi) north-west of Dobrzany, 24 km (15 mi) east of Stargard, and 53 km (33 mi) east of the regional capital Szczecin.

For the history of the region, see History of Pomerania.
