= Studnica, West Pomeranian Voivodeship =

Studnica
- Village
- Location within Poland
- Coordinates: 53°26′37″N 15°38′45″E
- Country: Poland
- Voivodeship: West Pomeranian
- County: Stargard
- Gmina: Ińsko
- Population: 112

Studnica [studˈnit͡sa] (German: Grassee) is a village in the administrative district of Gmina Ińsko, within Stargard County, West Pomeranian Voivodeship, in north-western Poland. It lies approximately 7 km (4 mi) east of Ińsko, 43 km (27 mi) east of Stargard, and 71 km (44 mi) east of the regional capital Szczecin.

For the history of the region, see History of Pomerania.

The village has a population of 112.
