= Lublino =

- Village
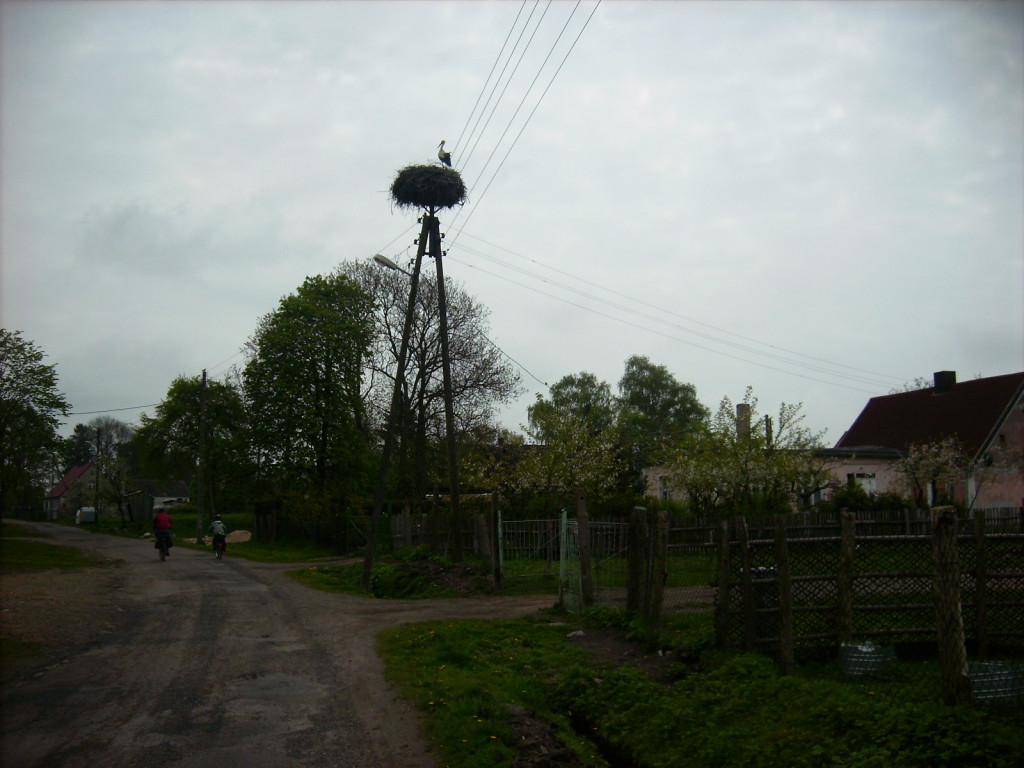

- Location within Poland
- Coordinates: 53°28′2″N 15°22′40″E
- Country: Poland
- Voivodeship: West Pomeranian
- County: Stargard
- Gmina: Chociwel
- Population: 100
- Time zone: UTC+1 (CET)
  - Summer (DST): UTC+2 (CEST)
- Area code: +48 91
- Car plates: ZST

Lublino [luˈblinɔ] (German: Nöblin) is a village in the administrative district of Gmina Chociwel, within Stargard County, West Pomeranian Voivodeship, in north-western Poland. It lies approximately 3 km (2 mi) east of Chociwel, 28 km (17 mi) north-east of Stargard, and 53 km (33 mi) east of the regional capital Szczecin. It is located on the western shore of Kamienny Most Lake in the historic region of Pomerania.

The village has a population of 100.

The National road 20 runs nearby, north-west of the village.
