= Orzechy =

- Village
- Location within Poland Location within West Pomeranian Voivodeship
- Coordinates: 53°27′59″N 15°32′14″E
- Country: Poland
- Voivodeship: West Pomeranian
- County: Stargard
- Gmina: Ińsko
- Time zone: UTC+1 (CET)
  - Summer (DST): UTC+2 (CEST)
- Postal code: 73-140
- Area code: +48 91

Orzechy (Polish: [ɔˈʐɛ.xɘ̟]), also known as Orzechowo (Polish: [ɔ.ʐɛˈxɔ.vɔ]), is a village in the West Pomeranian Voivodeship, Poland, located within the Gmina Ińsko, Stargard County.
