= Czertyń =

- Village
- Location within Poland
- Coordinates: 53°22′35″N 15°35′38″E
- Country: Poland
- Voivodeship: West Pomeranian
- County: Stargard
- Gmina: Ińsko
- Population: 120

Czertyń [ˈt͡ʂɛrtɨɲ] (German: Zehrten) is a village in the administrative district of Gmina Ińsko, within Stargard County, West Pomeranian Voivodeship, in north-western Poland. It lies approximately 8 km (5 mi) south-east of Ińsko, 38 km (24 mi) east of Stargard, and 68 km (42 mi) east of the regional capital Szczecin.

The village has a population of 120.
