= Miałka =

- Village
- Location within Poland
- Coordinates: 53°25′57″N 15°29′36″E
- Country: Poland
- Voivodeship: West Pomeranian
- County: Stargard
- Gmina: Ińsko
- Population: 64

Miałka [ˈmjau̯ka] (German: Werderfelde) is a village in the administrative district of Gmina Ińsko, within Stargard County, West Pomeranian Voivodeship, in north-western Poland. It lies approximately 4 km (2 mi) west of Ińsko, 33 km (21 mi) east of Stargard, and 61 km (38 mi) east of the regional capital Szczecin.

The village has a population of 64.
