= Biała, Stargard County =

Biała
- Village
- Location within Poland
- Coordinates: 53°24′41″N 15°25′29″E
- Country: Poland
- Voivodeship: West Pomeranian
- County: Stargard
- Gmina: Dobrzany

Biała [ˈbjawa] is a village in the administrative district of Gmina Dobrzany, within Stargard County, West Pomeranian Voivodeship, in northwestern Poland. It lies approximately 6 km (4 mi) north of Dobrzany, 28 km (17 mi) east of Stargard, and 56 km (35 mi) east of the regional capital Szczecin. For the history of the region, see History of Pomerania.
