= Mosina, Stargard County =

Mosina
- Village
- Location within Poland
- Coordinates: 53°23′11″N 15°21′17″E
- Country: Poland
- Voivodeship: West Pomeranian
- County: Stargard
- Gmina: Dobrzany

Mosina [mɔˈɕina] (German: Mössin) is a village in the administrative district of Gmina Dobrzany, within Stargard County, West Pomeranian Voivodeship, in north-western Poland. It lies approximately 6 km (4 mi) north-west of Dobrzany, 23 km (14 mi) east of Stargard, and 52 km (32 mi) east of the regional capital Szczecin.
