= List of county flags in the West Pomeranian Voivodeship =

Counties (powiat) in West Pomeranian Voivodeship, Poland have symbols in the form of flags.

Flag of the West Pomeranian Voivodeship

A flag is a sheet of fabric of a specific shape, colour and meaning, attached to a spar or mast. It may also include the coat of arms or emblem of the administrative unit it represents. In Poland, territorial units (municipal, city, and county councils) may establish flags in accordance with the Act of 21 December 1978 on badges and uniforms. In its original version, the act only allowed territorial units to establish coats of arms. It was not until the "Act of 29 December 1998 amending certain acts in connection with the implementation of the state system reform" that the right for provinces, counties, and municipalities to establish a flag as the symbol of their territorial unit was officially confirmed. This change benefited powiats, which were reinstated in 1999.

In 2025, 17 out of 18 poviats (the only poviat without a flag was Goleniów County) and all 3 cities with poviat rights had their own flag in West Pomeranian Voivodeship. This flag, since 2000, has been established by the voivodeship itself.

== List of valid county flags ==
=== City Counties ===
City	Flag	Description
City of Koszalin		The city's flag was established by Resolution No. 4/59 of 10 February 1959. It is a rectangular flag with proportions of 5:8, divided into two equal horizontal stripes: white and blue.
City of Szczecin		The city's flag was established by Resolution No. XXVIII/360/96 of 2 December 1996. It is a rectangular flag with proportions of 1:2, divided into six equal red and blue stripes. To the left of the stripes is the city's coat of arms.
City of Świnoujście		The city's flag was established on 20 August 1996. It is a rectangular flag with proportions of 2:3, divided into two parts in a ratio of 4:1: the upper one, dark blue, with the emblem from the city's coat of arms, and the lower one, divided into three horizontal stripes: white, red and dark blue in a ratio of 1:1:3.

=== Counties ===
County	Flag	Description
Powiat Białogardzki		The flag of the district was established by means of Resolution No. XXXIII/213/02 of 28 May 2002. It is a rectangular flag with proportions of 5:8, divided into three vertical stripes: two blue and one white in the ratio of 1:3:1. In the central part of the flag is the emblem from the county coat of arms.
Powiat choszczeński		The poviat flag, designed by Grzegorz Brzustowicz and Bogdan Brzustowicz, was established by means of resolution No. XIII/79/2000 of 29 June 2000. It is a rectangular flag with proportions of 5:8, divided into five horizontal stripes: red, yellow, white, yellow and green in the ratio of 4:1:10:1:4. In the central part of the flag the emblem from the countycoat of arms is placed.
Powiat drawski		The county flag, designed by Jerzy Jan Nałęcz, was established on 9 July 1999, again by Resolution No. XX/142/00 of 19 May 2000. It is a rectangular flag with proportions of 5:8, divided into three triangles: blue, white and red. To the left side of the flag is the county coat of arms.
Powiat gryficki		The county flag was established by Resolution No. XIV/82/2000 of 15 February 2001. It is a rectangular flag with proportions of 5:8, divided into three vertical stripes: two blue and one white in the ratio of 1:3:1. In the central part of the flag the county coat of arms is placed.
Powiat gryfiński		The county flag was established by Resolution No. XXI/246/2001 of 28 March 2001. It is a rectangular flag with proportions of 5:8, divided into four equal horizontal stripes: red, yellow, blue and white. In the central part of the flag is the county coat of arms.
Powiat kamieński		The county flag was established by Resolution No. XXIV/254/2006 of 3 February 2006. It is a rectangular flag with proportions of 5:8, divided into two equal vertical stripes: white and blue. In the central part of the flag is the county coat of arms.
Powiat kołobrzeski		The county flag was established by Resolution No. XXII/194/2005 of 14 April 2005. It is a rectangular flag with proportions of 5:8, divided into two equal vertical stripes: blue and white. In the central part of the flag is the county coat of arms.
Powiat koszaliński		The county flag was established on 13 June 2001. It is a rectangular flag with proportions 5:8 white in colour, in the central part of the flag the county coat of arms is placed.
Powiat łobeski		The county flag was established by means of Resolution No. XIII/99/2012 of 4 February 2012. It is a rectangular flag with proportions of 5:8, divided into three vertical stripes: red, yellow and blue in the ratio 2:1:2. On the left side of the flag there is the county coat of arms.
Powiat myśliborski		The county flag, designed by Marek Karolczak, was established by Resolution No. XXX/229/2001 of 25 April 2001. It is a rectangular flag with proportions of 5:8, divided into two equal horizontal stripes: white and blue. In the central part of the upper stripe is the county coat of arms.
Powiat policki		The county flag, designed by Radosław Gaziński, was established by resolution No. VII/52/99 of 14 September 1999. It is a square flag, divided in a chequered pattern into four parts: two blue and two white (the canton is blue). In the central part of the flag it may contain the county coat of arms.
Powiat pyrzycki		The first version of the county flag was established by Resolution No. X/57/03 of 1 October 2003, while the current one was established by Resolution No. XII/65/11 of 26 October 2011. It is a rectangular flag with proportions of 5:8, divided into three equal horizontal stripes: two white-red-white and one blue-white-blue. In the central part of the flag is the county coat of arms.
Powiat sławieński		The flag of the district was established by Resolution No. XXIV/181/2001 of 30 August 2001. It is a rectangular flag with proportions of 5:8, divided into three vertical stripes: two red and one white in the ratio of 1:3:1. In the central part of the flag the county coat of arms is placed.
Powiat stargardzki		The county flag was established by Resolution No. VII/99/15 of 27 May 2015. It is a rectangular piece of cloth with proportions of 3:5 white in colour, in the central part of the flag the county coat of arms is placed.
Powiat szczecinecki		The county flag was established by Resolution No. IX/65/99 of 4 November 1999. It is a rectangular flag with proportions 5:8, divided into three vertical stripes: two white and one red in the ratio of 1:3:1. In the central part of the flag the county coat of arms is placed.
Powiat świdwiński		The county flag was established by Resolution No. XX/112/2000 of 26 September 2000. It is a rectangular flag with proportions of 5:8, divided into two equal vertical stripes: white and blue. In the central part of the flag may be the county coat of arms.
Powiat wałecki		The flag of the county was established by the Resolution no XXV/202/2009 of 25 June 2009. It is a rectangular flag with proportions 5:8, divided into three vertical stripes: red, yellow and blue in the ratio of 2:5:2. In the central part of flag there is the emblem from the county coat of arms.

== See also ==
- List of municipal flags in the West Pomeranian Voivodeship
