= Kępno (disambiguation) =

Kępno may refer to the following places:

- Kępno in Greater Poland Voivodeship (west-central Poland)
- Kępno, Pomeranian Voivodeship (north Poland)
- Kępno, Warmian-Masurian Voivodeship (north Poland)
- Kępno, Stargard County in West Pomeranian Voivodeship (north-west Poland)
- Kępno, Szczecinek County in West Pomeranian Voivodeship (north-west Poland)
