= Kanice, West Pomeranian Voivodeship =

Kanice
- Village
- Location within Poland
- Coordinates: 53°29′11″N 15°35′28″E
- Country: Poland
- Voivodeship: West Pomeranian
- County: Stargard
- Gmina: Ińsko
- Population: 3

Kanice [kaˈnit͡sɛ] (German: Kanitzkamp) is a village in the administrative district of Gmina Ińsko, within Stargard County, West Pomeranian Voivodeship, in north-western Poland. It lies approximately 7 km (4 mi) north-east of Ińsko, 41 km (25 mi) north-east of Stargard, and 68 km (42 mi) east of the regional capital Szczecin.

The village has a population of 3.
