= Kleszcze, Stargard County =

Kleszcze
- Village
- Location within Poland
- Coordinates: 53°28′07″N 15°29′55″E
- Country: Poland
- Voivodeship: West Pomeranian
- County: Stargard
- Gmina: Ińsko
- Population: 5

Kleszcze [ˈklɛʂt͡ʂɛ] (German Kleist) is a village in the administrative district of Gmina Ińsko, within Stargard County, West Pomeranian Voivodeship, in north-western Poland.

The village has a population of 5.
