= Kania (surname) =

Kania is a surname of several possible origins. It is a Polish-language surname literally meaning a small bird of prey of the family Accipitridae or the colloquial name of the parasol mushroom whose Polish name is czubajka kania. It is also an Indian surname. Notable people with this surname include:

- Andrew Kania (born 1967), Canadian politician
- Ireneusz Kania (1940–2023), translator, essayist and literary critic
- Jakub Kania (poet) (1872–1957), Polish poet, folk writer and national activist
- Jakub Kania (ice hockey) (born 1990), Czech ice hockey player
- Julian Kania (born 2001), German footballer
- H. J. Kania (1890–1951), Chief Justice of India
- Madhukar Hiralal Kania (1927–2016), Chief Justice of India
- Paula Kania (born 1992), Polish tennis player
- Stanisław Kania (1927–2020), Polish politician
- Wojciech Kania (1912–1991), Polish military officer
- Zbigniew Kania, Polish sailor
