= Andreas Hakenberger =

German composer

Andreas Hakenberger (Krzemień (Kremmin), Pomerania, 1574–1627) was a Polish composer, and worked in Gdańsk beginning in 1608.

== Works, editions and recordings ==
- German madrigals - Neue deutsche Gesange nach Art der welschen Madrigalien for five to eight voices (Gdańsk, 1610),
- Latin motets - Sacri Modulorum for eight voices (Szczecin, 1615)
- Latin motets - Harmonia Sacra for six to twelve voices (Frankfurt, 1617),

Recordings

- motets De Sancto Spiritu. In nativitate Domini à 12. Cantate Domino. Voce mea ad Dominum clamavi. Exultate iusti. Ad te Domine levavi. De resurrectione Domini. De Sanctissima Trinitate à 12. De sanctissimo nomine Iesu. De Sancto Bernardo hymnus. Nigra sum. Surge, propera. Vulnerasti cor meum. Veni in hortum meum. Veni dilecte mi. Magnificat. - Schola Cantorum Gedanensis, dir. Jan Łukaszewski on French Accord label and also Polish Accord record label.
- motet Beati omnes, qui timent Dominum à 12 recorded on Hanseatic Wedding music. Weser-Renaissance Ensemble Bremen dir. Manfred Cordes. cpo
