= Kozy, West Pomeranian Voivodeship =

Kozy
- Village
- Location within Poland
- Coordinates: 53°22′59″N 15°26′6″E
- Country: Poland
- Voivodeship: West Pomeranian
- County: Stargard
- Gmina: Dobrzany

Kozy [ˈkɔzɨ] (formerly German: Kashagen) is a village in the administrative district of Gmina Dobrzany, within Stargard County, West Pomeranian Voivodeship, in north-western Poland. It lies approximately 3 km (2 mi) north of Dobrzany, 28 km (17 mi) east of Stargard, and 57 km (35 mi) east of the regional capital Szczecin.

For the history of the region, see History of Pomerania.
