= Kępno, Stargard County =

Kępno
- Village
- Location within Poland
- Coordinates: 53°22′35″N 15°22′10″E
- Country: Poland
- Voivodeship: West Pomeranian
- County: Stargard
- Gmina: Dobrzany

Kępno [ˈkɛmpnɔ] (German: Kempendorf) is a village in the administrative district of Gmina Dobrzany, within Stargard County, West Pomeranian Voivodeship, in north-western Poland. It lies approximately 5 km (3 mi) north-west of Dobrzany, 23 km (14 mi) east of Stargard, and 53 km (33 mi) east of the regional capital Szczecin.
