= Chociwel Wieś =

- Settlement
- Location within Poland
- Coordinates: 53°28′38″N 15°19′23″E
- Country: Poland
- Voivodeship: West Pomeranian
- County: Stargard
- Gmina: Chociwel
- Population: 21
- Time zone: UTC+1 (CET)
  - Summer (DST): UTC+2 (CEST)
- Area code: +48 91
- Car plates: ZST

Chociwel Wieś [xɔˈt͡ɕivɛl ˈvjɛɕ] is a settlement in the administrative district of Gmina Chociwel, within Stargard County, West Pomeranian Voivodeship, in north-western Poland. It lies approximately 2 km (1 mi) north-west of Chociwel, 25 km (16 mi) north-east of Stargard, and 50 km (31 mi) east of the regional capital Szczecin.

The settlement has a population of 21.

For the history of the region, see History of Pomerania.
