= Havenstein =

Havenstein is a German surname. Notable people with the surname include:

- Birgit Havenstein (born 1954), German classical flautist and composer
- Günter Havenstein (1928–2008), German long-distance runner
- Klaus Havenstein (1922–1998), German actor
- Rob Havenstein (born 1992), American football player
- Rudolf Havenstein (1857–1923), German lawyer and banker
- Walt Havenstein (born 1949), American businessman
