= Dolice, Gmina Dobrzany =

Dolice
- Village
- Location within Poland
- Coordinates: 53°21′30″N 15°29′24″E
- Country: Poland
- Voivodeship: West Pomeranian
- County: Stargard
- Gmina: Dobrzany

Dolice [dɔˈlit͡sɛ] (German: Konstantinopel) is a village in the administrative district of Gmina Dobrzany, within Stargard County, West Pomeranian Voivodeship, in north-western Poland. It lies approximately 5 km (3 mi) east of Dobrzany, 31 km (19 mi) east of Stargard, and 61 km (38 mi) east of the regional capital Szczecin.

For the history of the region, see History of Pomerania.
