= Kania Mała =

- Village
- Location within Poland
- Coordinates: 53°31′28″N 15°14′48″E
- Country: Poland
- Voivodeship: West Pomeranian
- County: Stargard
- Gmina: Chociwel
- Time zone: UTC+1 (CET)
  - Summer (DST): UTC+2 (CEST)
- Area code: +48 91
- Car plates: ZST

Kania Mała [ˈkaɲa ˈmawa] (German: Vorwerk Kannenberg) is a village in the administrative district of Gmina Chociwel, within Stargard County, West Pomeranian Voivodeship, in north-western Poland. It lies approximately 9 km (6 mi) north-west of Chociwel, 26 km (16 mi) north-east of Stargard, and 46 km (29 mi) east of the regional capital Szczecin. It is located in the historic region of Pomerania.
