= Kielno, West Pomeranian Voivodeship =

Kielno
- Settlement
- Location within Poland
- Coordinates: 53°22′46″N 15°26′42″E
- Country: Poland
- Voivodeship: West Pomeranian
- County: Stargard
- Gmina: Dobrzany

Kielno [ˈkʲɛlnɔ] (German: Kehlungen) is a settlement in the administrative district of Gmina Dobrzany, within Stargard County, West Pomeranian Voivodeship, in north-western Poland.

For the history of the region, see History of Pomerania.
