= Günter Havenstein =

German long-distance runner (1928–2008)

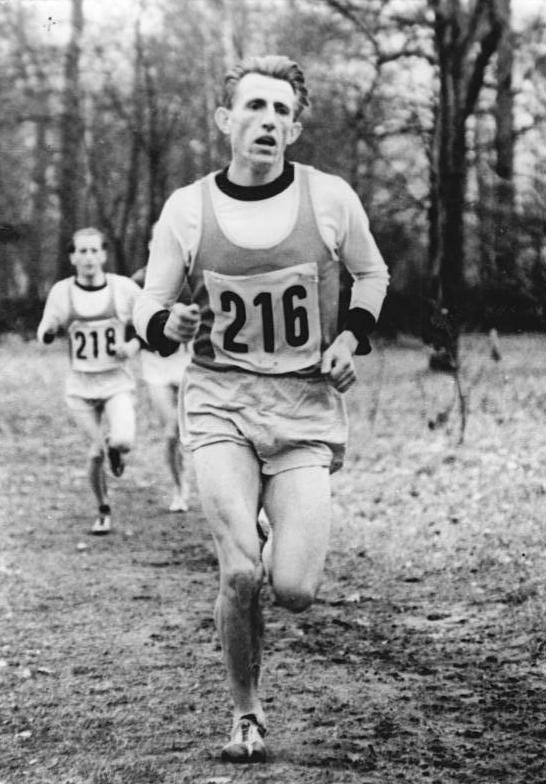

Personal information
- Nationality: German
- Born: 14 December 1928 Konstantinopel, Germany
- Died: 9 February 2008 (aged 79) Potsdam, Germany

Sport
- Sport: Long-distance running
- Event: Marathon

Günter Havenstein (14 December 1928 – 9 February 2008) was a German long-distance runner. He competed in the marathon at the 1960 Summer Olympics.
