= Długie, Stargard County =

Długie
- Village
- Location within Poland
- Coordinates: 53°25′39″N 15°23′59″E
- Country: Poland
- Voivodeship: West Pomeranian
- County: Stargard
- Gmina: Chociwel
- Population: 258
- Time zone: UTC+1 (CET)
  - Summer (DST): UTC+2 (CEST)
- Postal code: 73-120
- Area code: +48 91
- Car plates: ZST
- Website: http://www.dlugie.prv.pl

Długie ([ˈdwuɡʲɛ]) is a village in the administrative district of Gmina Chociwel, within Stargard County, West Pomeranian Voivodeship, in north-western Poland. It lies approximately 6 km (4 mi) south-east of Chociwel, 27 km (17 mi) north-east of Stargard, and 55 km (34 mi) east of the regional capital Szczecin.

The village has a population of 258.
