= Kania, Stargard County =

Kania
- Village
- Location within Poland
- Coordinates: 53°30′13″N 15°14′41″E
- Country: Poland
- Voivodeship: West Pomeranian
- County: Stargard
- Gmina: Chociwel
- Population: 412
- Time zone: UTC+1 (CET)
  - Summer (DST): UTC+2 (CEST)
- Postal code: 73-120
- Area code: +48 91
- Car plates: ZST

Kania [ˈkaɲa] (German: Kannenberg) is a village in the administrative district of Gmina Chociwel, within Stargard County, West Pomeranian Voivodeship, in north-western Poland. It lies approximately 8 km (5 mi) north-west of Chociwel, 24 km (15 mi) north-east of Stargard, and 45 km (28 mi) east of the regional capital Szczecin. It is located in the historic region of Pomerania.

The village has a population of 412.
