= Dolnik, West Pomeranian Voivodeship =

Dolnik
- Village
- Location within Poland
- Coordinates: 53°23′53″N 15°34′18″E
- Country: Poland
- Voivodeship: West Pomeranian
- County: Stargard
- Gmina: Ińsko
- Population: 0

Dolnik [ˈdɔlnik] is a former village in the administrative district of Gmina Ińsko, within Stargard County, West Pomeranian Voivodeship, in north-western Poland.
