= Radomyśl, Stargard County =

Radomyśl
- Village
- Location within Poland
- Coordinates: 53°26′30″N 15°18′15″E
- Country: Poland
- Voivodeship: West Pomeranian
- County: Stargard
- Gmina: Chociwel
- Time zone: UTC+1 (CET)
  - Summer (DST): UTC+2 (CEST)
- Area code: +48 91
- Car plates: ZST

Radomyśl (Polish pronunciation: [raˈdɔmɨɕl]) is a village in the administrative district of Gmina Chociwel, within Stargard County, West Pomeranian Voivodeship, in north-western Poland. It is located in the historic region of Pomerania.
