= Gmina Dobrzany =

Gmina Dobrzany Dobrzany Commune
- Gmina
- Coat of arms
- Interactive map of Gmina Dobrzany
- Coordinates (Dobrzany): 53°21′31″N 15°25′34″E
- Country: Poland
- Voivodeship: West Pomeranian
- County: Stargard
- Seat: Dobrzany

Area
  - Total: 135.12 km^{2} (52.17 sq mi)

Population (2006)
  - Total: 5,073
  - Density: 37.54/km^{2} (97.24/sq mi)
  - Urban: 2,420
  - Rural: 2,653
- Website: http://www.dobrzany.pl/

Gmina Dobrzany is an urban-rural gmina (administrative district) in Stargard County, West Pomeranian Voivodeship, in north-western Poland. Its seat is the town of Dobrzany, which lies approximately 27 kilometres (17 mi) east of Stargard and 57 km (35 mi) east of the regional capital Szczecin.

The Gmina covers an area of 135.12 square kilometres (52.2 sq mi) and, as of 2006, had a total population of 5,073 (of which 2,420 lived in Dobrzany and 2,653 in the rural areas).

The gmina includes part of the protected Ińsko Landscape Park.

== Villages ==
Apart from the town of Dobrzany, Gmina Dobrzany contains the villages and settlements of Biała, Błotno, Bytowo, Dolice, Grabnica, Kępno, Kielno, Kozy, Krzemień, Lutkowo, Mosina, Odargowo, Ognica, Okole, Sierakowo and Szadzko.

== Neighbouring gminas ==
Gmina Dobrzany is bordered by the gminas of Chociwel, Drawsko Pomorskie, Ińsko, Kalisz Pomorski, Marianowo, Recz and Suchań.
