= Gronówko, West Pomeranian Voivodeship =

Gronówko
- Village
- Location within Poland
- Coordinates: 53°24′15″N 15°34′3″E
- Country: Poland
- Voivodeship: West Pomeranian
- County: Stargard
- Gmina: Ińsko
- Population: 90

Gronówko [ɡrɔˈnufkɔ] (German: Klein Grünow) is a village in the administrative district of Gmina Ińsko, within Stargard County, West Pomeranian Voivodeship, in north-western Poland. It lies approximately 4 km (2 mi) south of Ińsko, 37 km (23 mi) east of Stargard, and 66 km (41 mi) east of the regional capital Szczecin.

The village has a population of 90.
