= Karkowo, Stargard County =

Karkowo
- Village
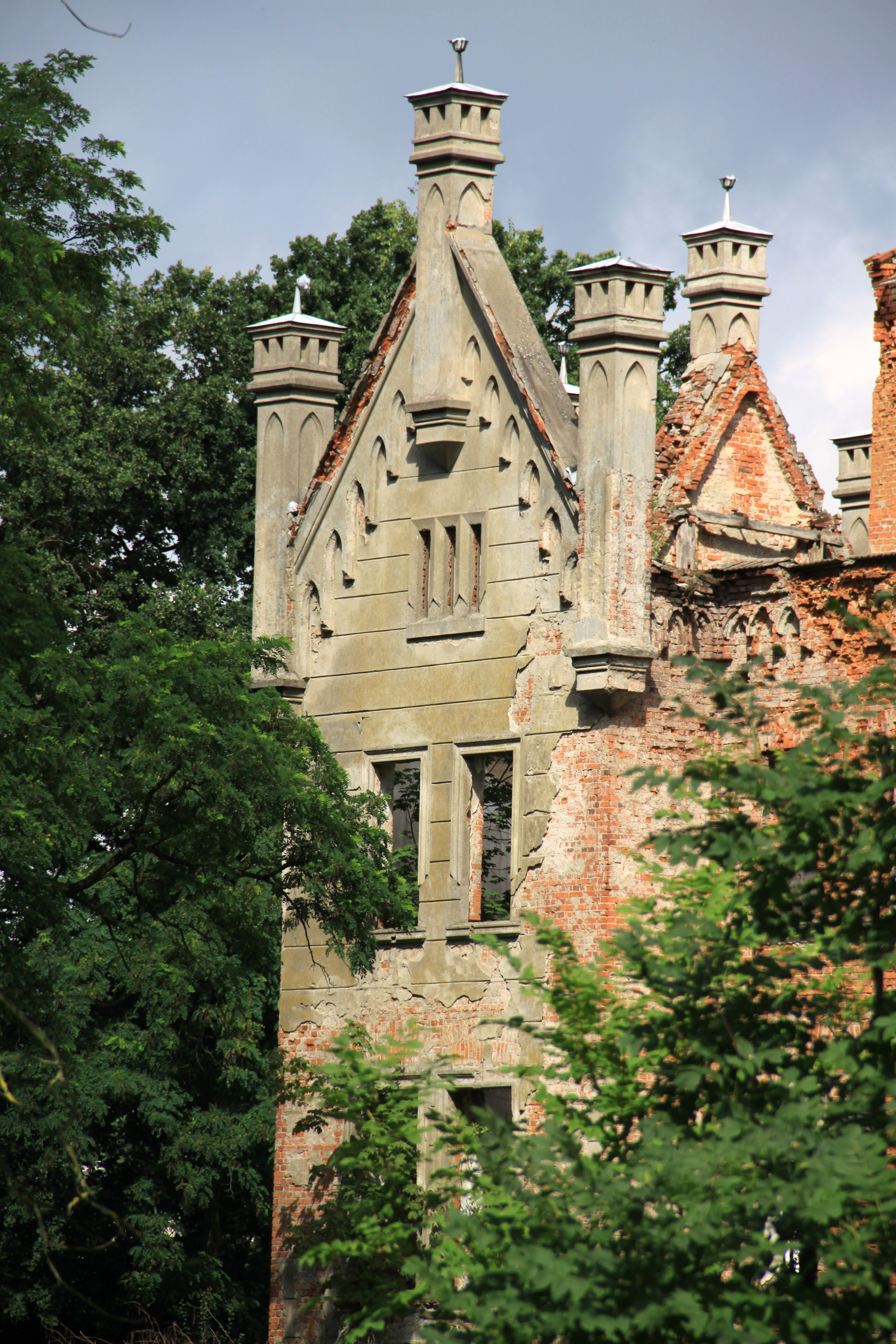
- Palace ruins in Karkowo

- Location within Poland
- Coordinates: 53°28′31″N 15°17′23″E
- Country: Poland
- Voivodeship: West Pomeranian
- County: Stargard
- Gmina: Chociwel

Population
  - Total: 335
- Time zone: UTC+1 (CET)
  - Summer (DST): UTC+2 (CEST)
- Postal code: 73-120
- Area code: +48 91
- Car plates: ZST

Karkowo [karˈkɔvɔ] is a village in the administrative district of Gmina Chociwel, within Stargard County, West Pomeranian Voivodeship, in north-western Poland. It lies approximately 4 km (2 mi) west of Chociwel, 24 km (15 mi) north-east of Stargard, and 48 km (30 mi) east of the regional capital Szczecin. It is located in the historic region of Pomerania.

The village has a population of 335.
