= Gmina Chociwel =

Gmina Chociwel Chociwel Commune
- Gmina
- Coat of arms
- Interactive map of Gmina Chociwel
- Coordinates (Chociwel): 53°27′58″N 15°20′23″E
- Country: Poland
- Voivodeship: West Pomeranian
- County: Stargard
- Seat: Chociwel

Area
  - Total: 160.57 km^{2} (62.00 sq mi)

Population (2006)
  - Total: 6,106
  - Density: 38.03/km^{2} (98.49/sq mi)
  - Urban: 3,285
  - Rural: 2,821
- Website: http://www.chociwel.pl/

Gmina Chociwel is an urban-rural gmina (administrative district) in Stargard County, West Pomeranian Voivodeship, in north-western Poland. Its seat is the town of Chociwel, which lies approximately 26 kilometres (16 mi) north-east of Stargard and 51 km (32 mi) east of the regional capital Szczecin.

The gmina covers an area of 160.57 square kilometres (62.0 sq mi), and as of 2006 its total population is 6,106 (out of which the population of Chociwel amounts to 3,285, and the population of the rural part of the gmina is 2,821).

The gmina contains part of the protected area called Ińsko Landscape Park.

== Villages ==
Apart from the town of Chociwel, Gmina Chociwel contains the villages and settlements of Bobrowniki, Bród, Chociwel Wieś, Długie, Kamienny Most, Kamionka, Kania, Kania Mała, Karkowo, Lisowo, Lublino, Mokrzyca, Oświno, Pieczonka, Płątkowo, Radomyśl, Sątyrz Drugi, Sątyrz Pierwszy, Spławie, Starzyce, Wieleń Pomorski and Zabrodzie.

== Neighbouring gminas ==
Gmina Chociwel is bordered by the gminas of Dobra, Dobrzany, Ińsko, Marianowo, Maszewo, Stara Dąbrowa and Węgorzyno.
