= Długie, Gryfino County =

Długie
- Hamlet
- Location within Poland
- Coordinates: 53°00′46″N 14°38′11″E
- Country: Poland
- Voivodeship: West Pomeranian
- County: Gryfino
- Municipality: Banie
- Time zone: UTC+1 (CET)
  - Summer (DST): UTC+2 (CEST)
- Area code: +48 91
- Car plates: ZGR

Długie (Polish: [ˈdwu.ɡʲɛ]), also known as Góralice (Polish: [ɡu.raˈli.t͡sɛ]), is a hamlet in the West Pomeranian Voivodeship, Poland, located within the municipality of Banie in Gryfino County.
