= Okole, Stargard County =

Okole
- Hamlet
- Location within Poland
- Coordinates: 53°23′13″N 15°29′15″E
- Country: Poland
- Voivodeship: West Pomeranian
- County: Stargard
- Gmina: Ińsko
- Time zone: UTC+1 (CET)
  - Summer (DST): UTC+2 (CEST)
- Postal code: 73-130
- Area code: +48 91

Okole is a hamlet in the West Pomeranian Voivodeship, Poland, located within the Gmina Ińsko, Stargard County.
