= Vorwerk =

Vorwerk may refer to:

- a Vorwerk (fortification), an advanced fortification of a local castle
- German word from which the Polish word Folwark with the same meaning is derived, an agricultural estate outpost, often a development of the former

== Places ==
- Vorwerk, Lower Saxony, a municipality in the Rotenburg district, Lower Saxony
- Logumer Vorwerk, a locality of Emden, Lower Saxony
- a locality of Altenmedingen, in the Uelzen district, Lower Saxony
- a subdivision of Celle, Lower Saxony

== Other ==
- Vorwerk (company), a German company which produces vacuum cleaners
- Vorwerk (chicken), a German breed of chicken
