= Jakub Kania (ice hockey) =

Czech ice hockey player

- Born: December 16, 1990 (age 34); Český Těšín, Czechoslovakia
- Height: 6 ft 0 in (183 cm)
- Weight: 192 lb (87 kg; 13 st 10 lb)
- Position: Defence
- Shoots: Left
- Czech Extraliga team: HC Oceláři Třinec
- Playing career: 2008–present

Jakub Kania (born December 16, 1990) is a Czech professional ice hockey defenceman. He played with HC Oceláři Třinec in the Czech Extraliga during the 2010–11 Czech Extraliga season.
