= Ińsko Landscape Park =

Protected area in north-western Poland

- Iński Park Krajobrazowy
- IUCN category V (protected landscape/seascape)
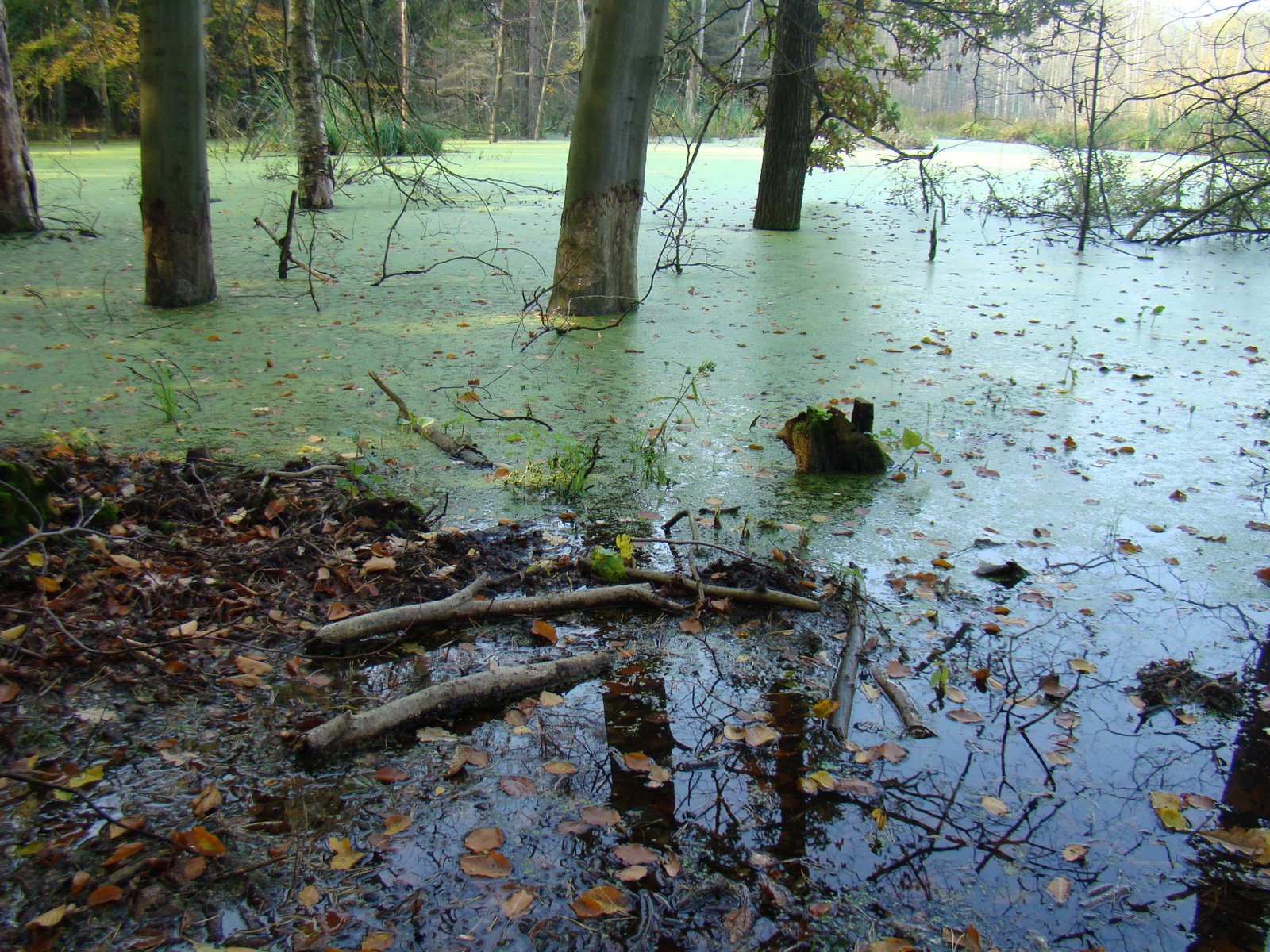
- Interactive map of Ińsko Landscape Park
- Location: West Pomeranian Voivodeship
- Coordinates: 53°28′N 15°30′E
- Area: 177.6 km^{2} (68.6 sq mi)
- Established: 1981

Ińsko Landscape Park (Iński Park Krajobrazowy) is a protected area (Landscape Park) in north-western Poland, established in 1981, covering an area of 177.6 square kilometres (68.6 sq mi).

The Park lies within West Pomeranian Voivodeship: in Łobez County (Gmina Węgorzyno) and Stargard County (Gmina Chociwel, Gmina Dobrzany, Gmina Ińsko). Within the Landscape Park are three nature reserves.
