= Gmina Ińsko =

Gmina Ińsko Ińsko Commune
- Gmina
- Flag Coat of arms
- Interactive map of Gmina Ińsko
- Coordinates (Ińsko): 53°26′12″N 15°33′7″E
- Country: Poland
- Voivodeship: West Pomeranian
- County: Stargard
- Seat: Ińsko

Area
  - Total: 151.01 km^{2} (58.31 sq mi)

Population (2006)
  - Total: 3,517
  - Density: 23.29/km^{2} (60.32/sq mi)
  - Urban: 2,001
  - Rural: 1,516
- Website: http://www.insko.pl/

Gmina Ińsko is an urban-rural gmina (administrative district) in Stargard County, West Pomeranian Voivodeship, in north-western Poland. Its seat is the town of Ińsko, which lies approximately 37 kilometres (23 mi) east of Stargard and 65 km (40 mi) east of the regional capital Szczecin.

The gmina covers an area of 151.01 square kilometres (58.3 sq mi), and as of 2006 its total population is 3,517 (out of which the population of Ińsko amounts to 2,001, and the population of the rural part of the gmina is 1,516).

The gmina contains part of the protected area called Ińsko Landscape Park.

== Villages ==
Apart from the town of Ińsko, Gmina Ińsko contains the villages and settlements of Ciemnik, Czertyń, Dolnik, Granica, Gronówko, Kanice, Kleszcze, Linówko, Miałka, Nierybno, Powalice, Ścienne, Storkowo, Studnica, Waliszewo and Wierzchucice.

== Neighbouring gminas ==
Gmina Ińsko is bordered by the gminas of Chociwel, Dobrzany, Drawsko Pomorskie, Kalisz Pomorski, Recz and Węgorzyno.
