= Dobrzany =

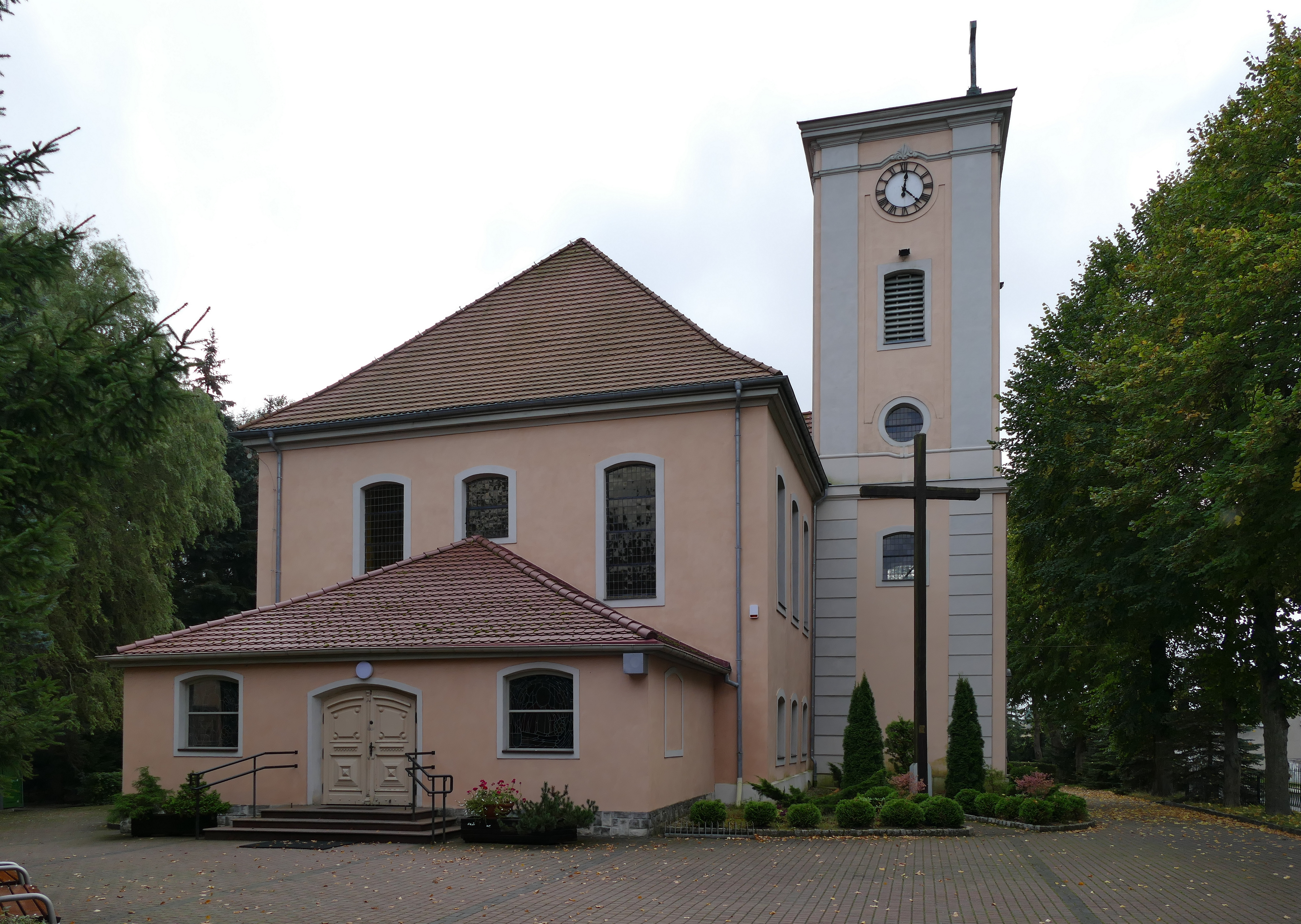
- Saint Michael Archangel church

- Flag Coat of arms

- Location within Poland
- Coordinates: 53°21′31″N 15°25′34″E
- Country: Poland
- Voivodeship: West Pomeranian
- County: Stargard
- Gmina: Dobrzany

Government
  - Mayor: Paweł Filip

Area
  - Total: 5.34 km^{2} (2.06 sq mi)

Population (31 December 2021)
  - Total: 2,225
  - Density: 417/km^{2} (1,080/sq mi)
- Time zone: UTC+1 (CET)
  - Summer (DST): UTC+2 (CEST)
- Postal code: 73-130
- Area code: +48 91
- Car plates: ZST
- Website: https://www.dobrzany.pl

Dobrzany [dɔˈbʐanɨ] (Kashubian: Jakùbòwò; German: Jacobshagen, or Jakobshagen) is a town in Stargard County, West Pomeranian Voivodeship, in north-western Poland. As of December 2021, the town has a population of 2,225. It is situated on the Pęzinka River and the northern shore of Szadzko Lake in the historic region of Pomerania.

== History ==
A settlement existed at the site of current-day Dobrzany since the Stone Age. Excavations have uncovered work tools that dated from the 7th to the 10th century BC.

The area became part of the emerging Polish state in 967. In the Middle Ages, in the 10th-12th centuries, two strongholds existed at the site. It was part of medieval Poland and the Duchy of Pomerania after it split off from Poland during the fragmentation of the realm in the mid-12th century. The town developed as a settlement in the vicinity of the stronghold in the 12th century. Dobrzany, then called Jacobshagen, was granted town rights at the latest in 1336, when it came into the possession of the Pomeranian family of Steglitz, vassals of the dukes of Szczecin. In 1359, the town passed to the lords of nearby Szadzko. During that time, the inhabitants made their living from agriculture. They also had a mill and brewery. In 1359 the town passed to the Duchy of Wolgast, in 1368 to the Duchy of Słupsk, and in 1459 back to the united Duchy of Pomerania. In 1567, Pomeranian Duke Barnim XI issued the town the right to hold two annual fairs. In 1598, a church was constructed.

In 1701 the town became part of Prussia. On 17 June 1781, a large fire started in the mill and destroyed most of the town. Thanks to the support of Prussian King Frederick II, it was rebuilt under the direction of renowned Pomeranian architect, David Gilly. The people destroyed the old Szadzko (then Saatzig) castle and made use of the stones in the rebuilding.

On 20 August 1896, a railway station was opened in Jacobshagen thus connecting the city to the nearby village of Kozy (then Kashagen) in modern fashion. Although new companies came to Jacobshagen, only a sawmill, a brickyard, a dairy, and a cloth factory were created. A mere 1,900 inhabitants were left. At the turn of the 20th century, Jacobshagen had a Protestant church, a synagogue, a district court, and a forestry office. During Nazi rule, a Reich Labour Service unit was located in the town.

During World War II, the Germans operated a forced labour subcamp of the Stalag II-D prisoner-of-war camp in the town. In the war, the town was sixty percent destroyed when it was occupied by the Soviet Red Army on 2 March 1945. After Nazi Germany's defeat in the war, Dobrzany became again part of Poland. The town's population was expelled. The first new post-war settlers where Poles returning from forced labour in Germany.

== Notable people ==
- David Hollatz (1648–1713 in Jakobshagen) a Lutheran dogmatician, became pastor in Jakobshagen in 1692.
