= Ińsko =

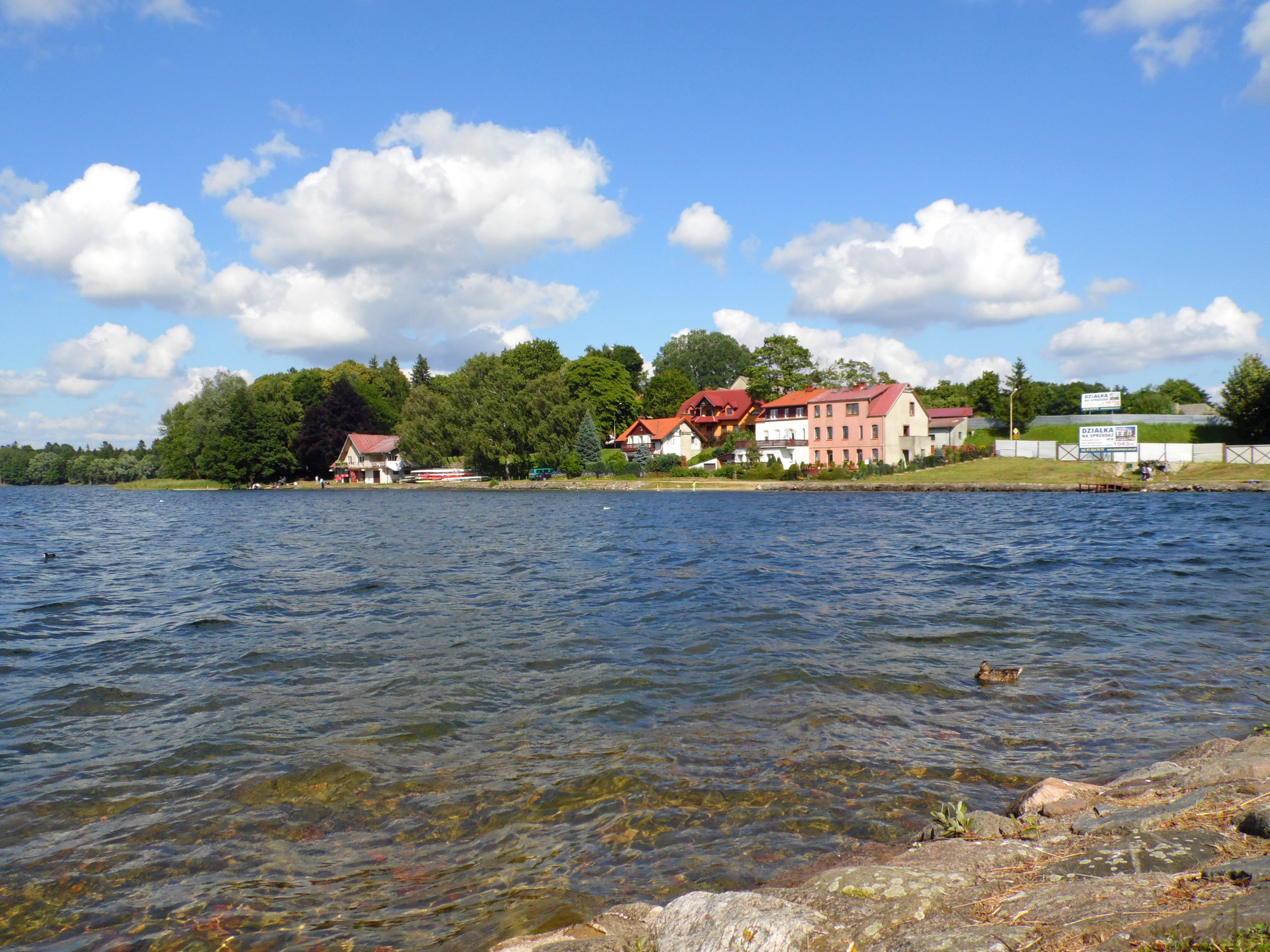

- Flag Coat of arms

- Location within Poland
- Coordinates: 53°26′12″N 15°33′7″E
- Country: Poland
- Voivodeship: West Pomeranian
- County: Stargard
- Gmina: Ińsko

Area
  - Total: 6.95 km^{2} (2.68 sq mi)

Population (2016)
  - Total: 1,980
  - Density: 285/km^{2} (738/sq mi)
- Time zone: UTC+1 (CET)
  - Summer (DST): UTC+2 (CEST)
- Postal code: 73-140
- Vehicle registration: ZST
- Website: http://www.insko.pl

Ińsko [ˈiɲskɔ] (Kashubian: Nerbarg; German: Nörenberg) is a town in Stargard County, West Pomeranian Voivodeship, in north-western Poland. It has a population of 1,980 (2016).

Ińsko gives its name to the protected area known as Ińsko Landscape Park.

== History ==
During World War II, the German government operated a forced labour subcamp of the Stalag II-D prisoner-of-war camp in the town.

== Demographics ==
Historical population

Year	Pop.	±%
1871	2,667	—
1880	2,926	+9.7%
1890	2,815	−3.8%
1900	2,648	−5.9%
1910	2,605	−1.6%

Year	Pop.	±%
1925	2,606	+0.0%
1950	1,055	−59.5%
1960	1,612	+52.8%
2010	2,026	+25.7%
