= Chociwel =

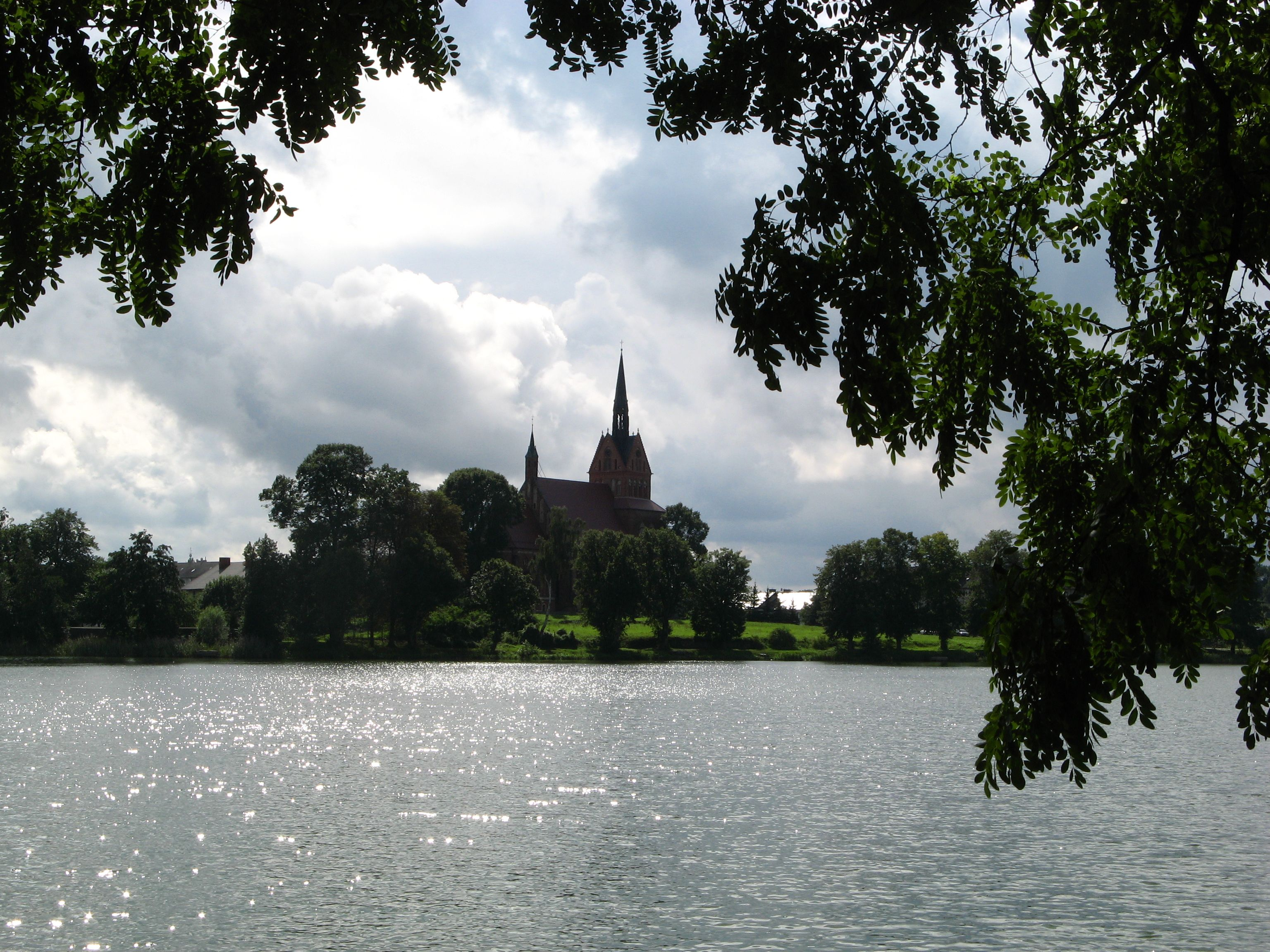
- Lake Starzyca and Our Lady of Sorrows church

- Coat of arms

- Location within Poland
- Coordinates: 53°27′58″N 15°20′23″E
- Country: Poland
- Voivodeship: West Pomeranian
- County: Stargard
- Gmina: Chociwel
- Town rights: 1338

Government
  - Mayor: Stanisław Szymczak

Area
  - Total: 3.67 km^{2} (1.42 sq mi)

Population (31 December 2021)
  - Total: 3,105
  - Density: 846/km^{2} (2,190/sq mi)
- Time zone: UTC+1 (CET)
  - Summer (DST): UTC+2 (CEST)
- Postal code: 73-120
- Area code: +48 91
- Vehicle registration: ZST
- Website: http://www.chociwel.pl

Chociwel [xɔˈt͡ɕivɛl] (Kashubian: Frinwôłd; German: Freienwalde in Pommern) is a town in northwestern Poland, in West Pomeranian Voivodeship, in Stargard County. It is the seat of Gmina Chociwel. As of December 2021, it has 3,105 inhabitants.

== History ==
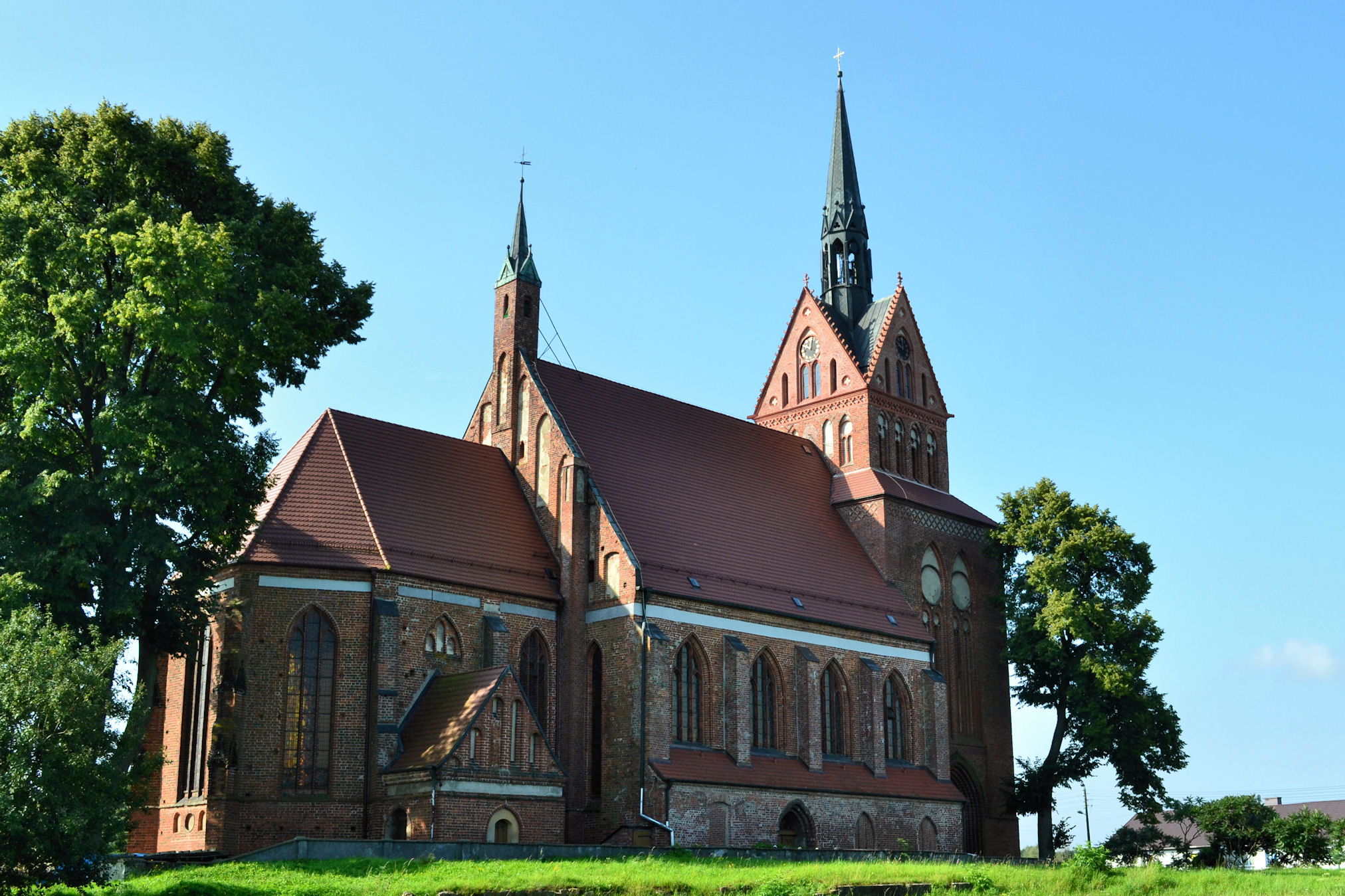
Our Lady of Sorrows church

In the Middle Ages it was a Slavic gród. In 967 it became part of Poland under first historic ruler Mieszko I of Poland. The first church was built around 1124. The settlement was mentioned in 1190 and 1321. In 1338 it was granted Magdeburg town rights and was known as Freienwalde. In the 15th century the town's main landmark was built – the Gothic Our Lady of Sorrows church.

After the dissolution of the Duchy of Pomerania, in the mid-17th century it fell to the Margraviate of Brandenburg, then from 1701 it was part of Prussia, and from 1871 to 1945 it was part of Germany. It had a population of 3,406 in 1939. In 1945 it was awarded to Poland, along with most of Western Pomerania, at the insistence of Josef Stalin, and its entire population was expelled. Because of this, the population in 1946 was only 402, all of them Polish newcomers. After the war, the town was given the name Chociwel, which is a modern version of the Old Polish name of the nearby lake Kotzavil, as it appeared in medieval documents. Among the settlers were Poles displaced from former eastern Poland annexed by the Soviet Union, Poles returning from forced labour both from the USSR and Germany and soldiers of the Polish Armed Forces in the West.

== Demographics ==
Detailed data as of 31 December 2021:

Description	All		Women		Men	
Unit	person	percentage	person	percentage	person	percentage
Population	3105	100	1579	50.9%	1526	41.1%
Population density	846.0		430.2		415.8	

=== Number of inhabitants by year ===
Year	Population	Source
1995	3254 ▲	
2000	3311 ▲	
2005	3303 ▼	
2010	3300 ▼	
2015	3196 ▼	
2020	3123 ▼	
2021	3105 ▼	

== Sports ==
The local football club is Piast Chociwel. It competes in the lower leagues.

== Gallery ==
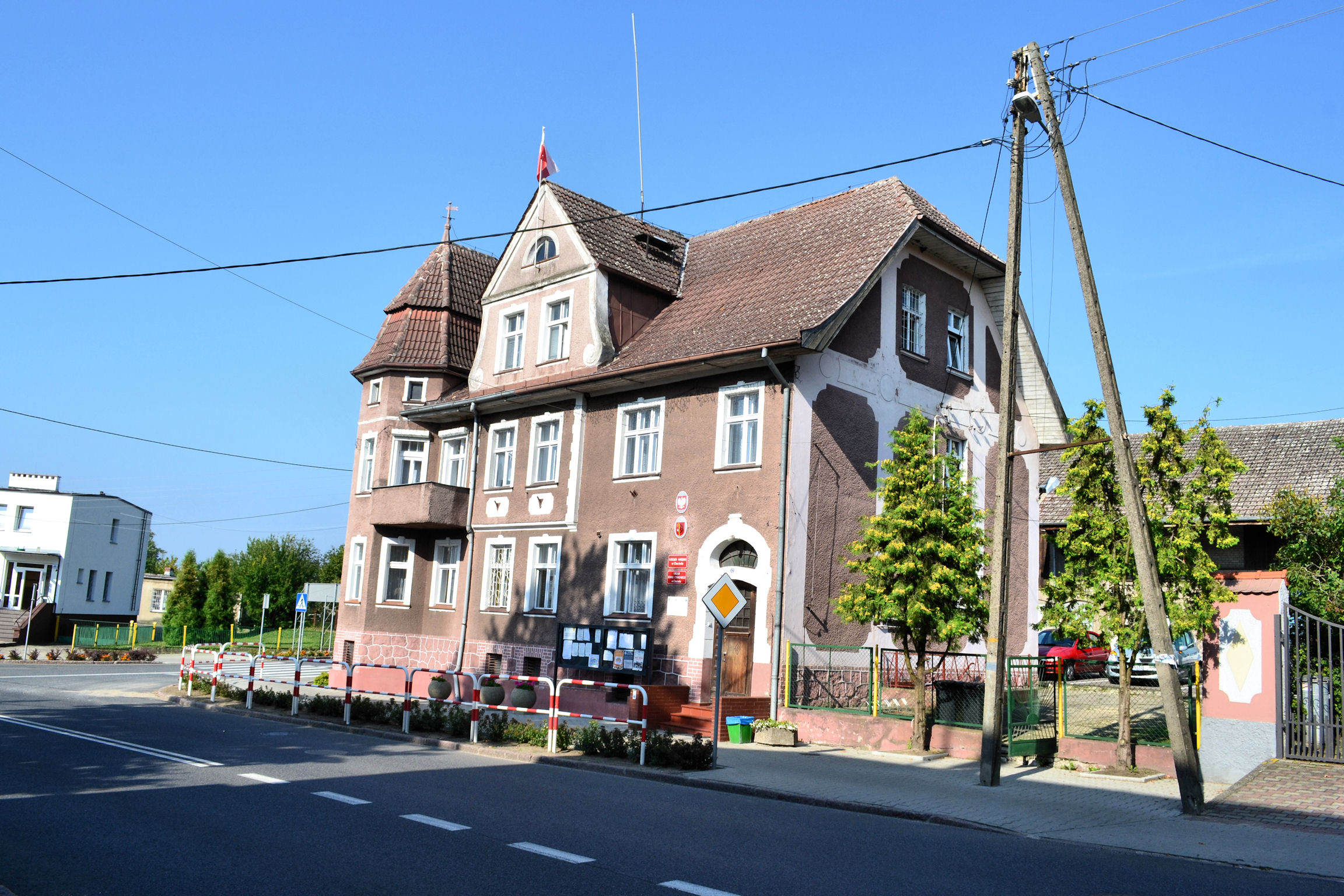
Municipal office

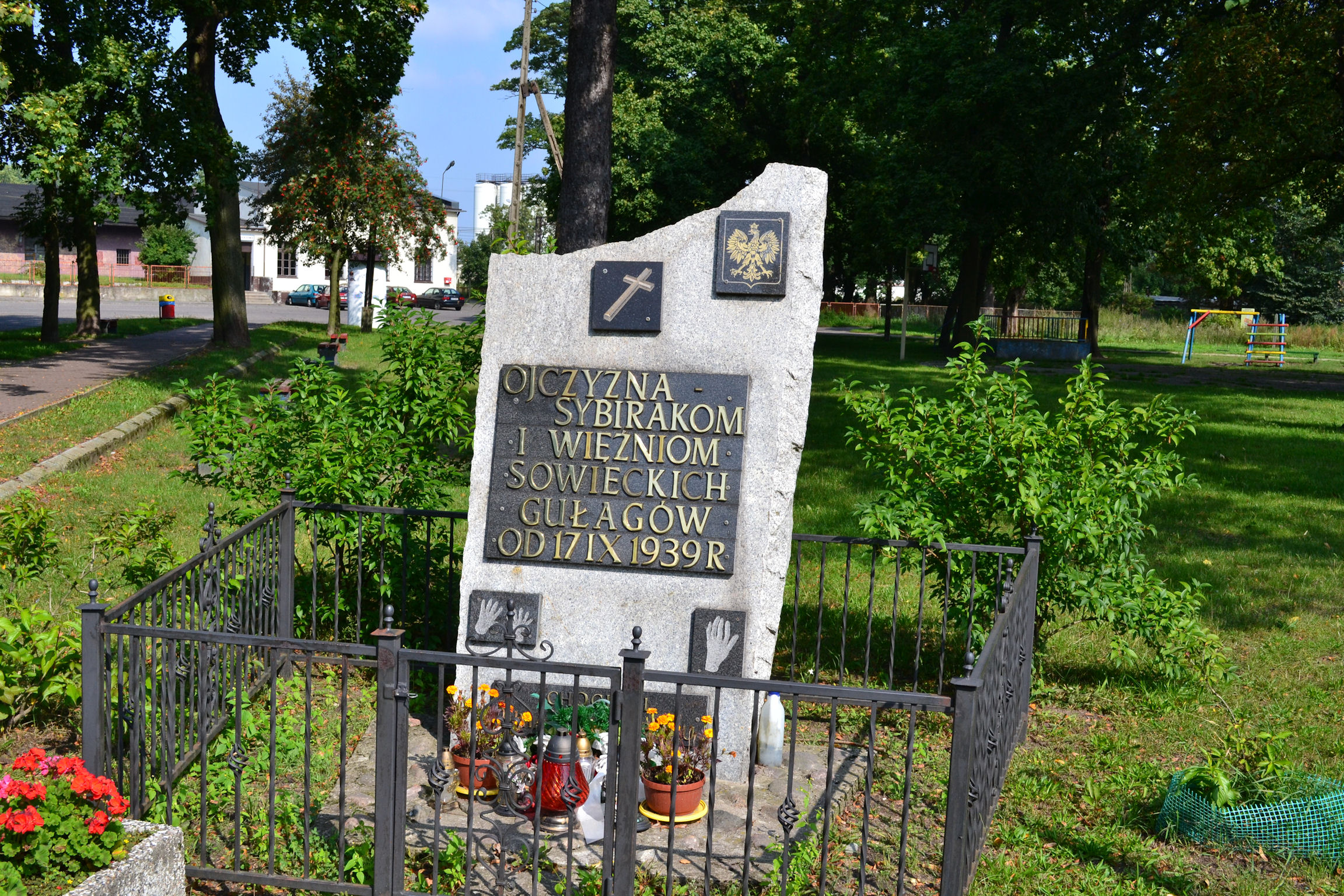
Memorial to Polish prisoners of Soviet Gulag camps and deportees to Siberia

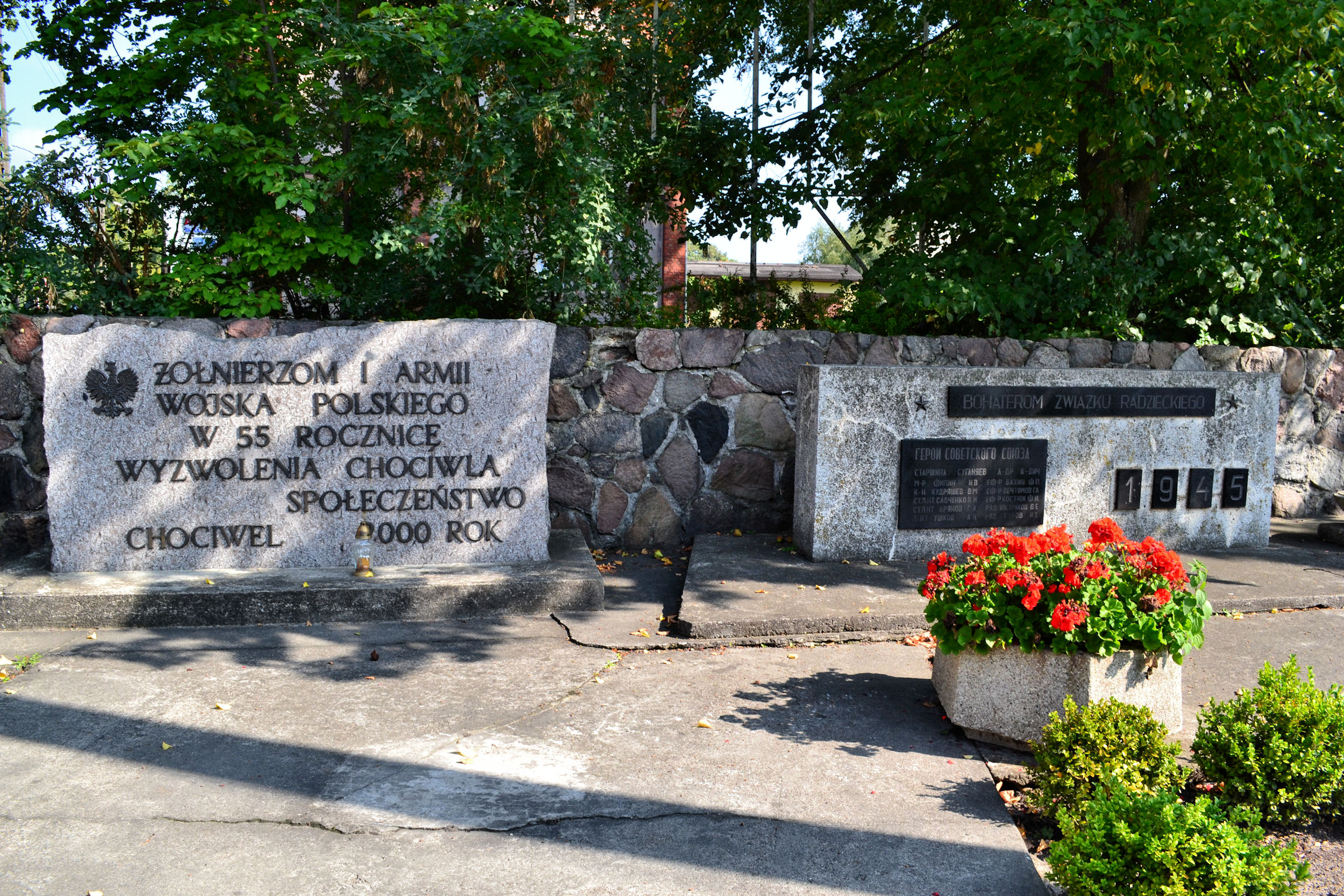
Polish First Army Memorial

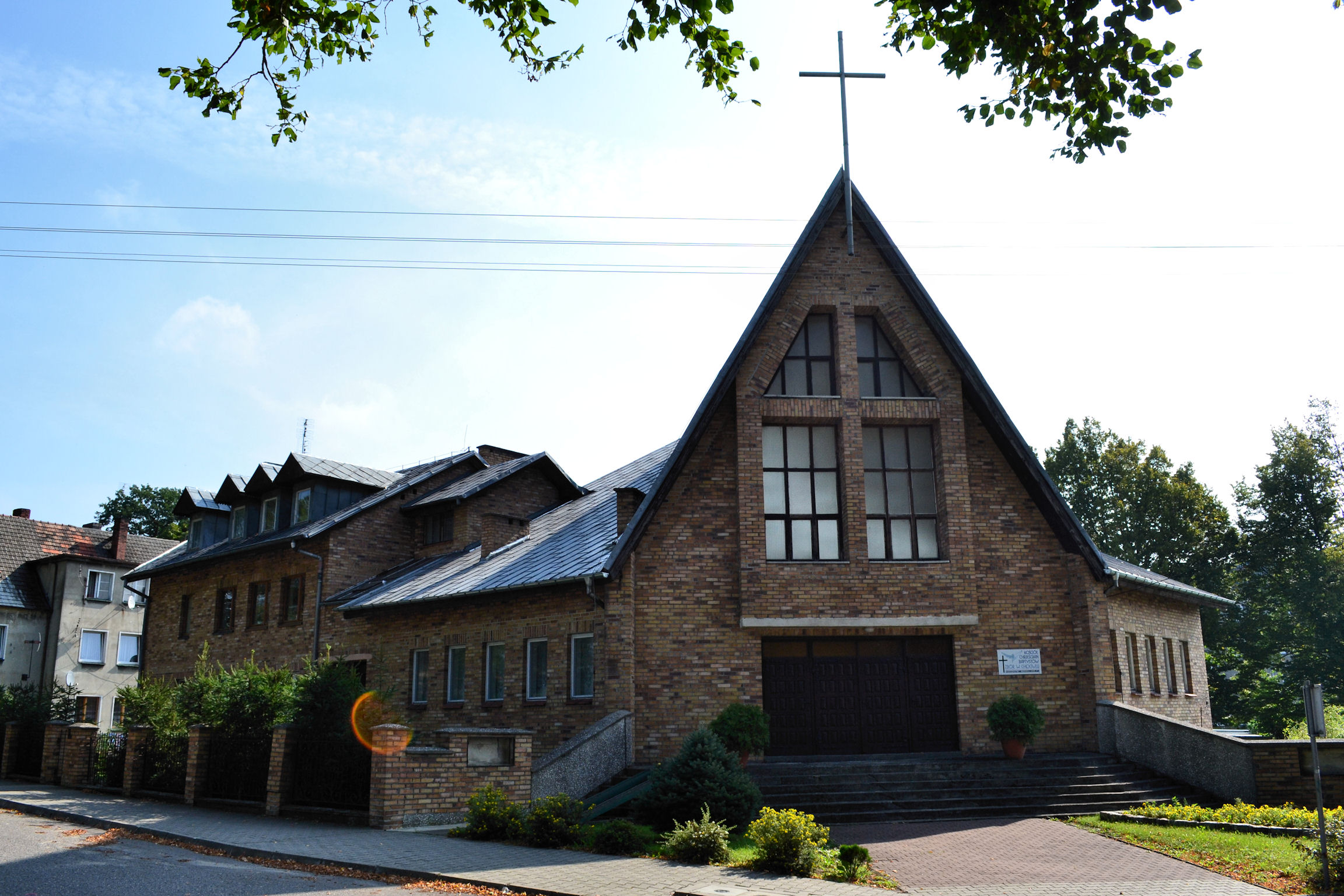
Baptist church

== Notable residents ==
- Hugo von Kathen (1855–1932), general
- Herbert Hoffmann (1919–2010), artist
