= Adam Świerkocz =

Polish general

brigadier general Adam Świerkocz
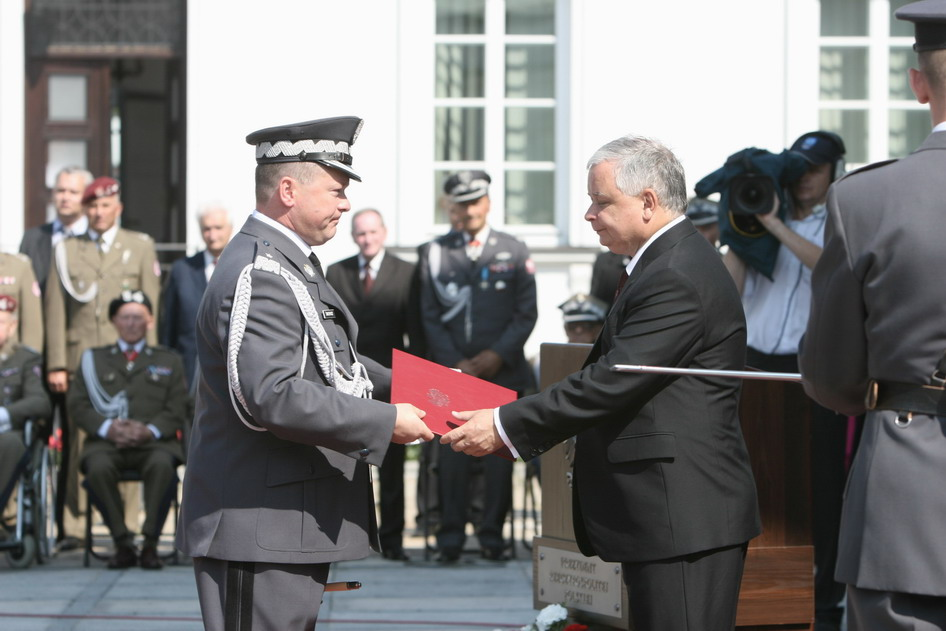
- Świerkocz receiving a nomination for the rank of a general from President Lech Kaczyński in 2007
- Born: Adam Mirosław Świerkocz; 15 December 1964 (age 61); Prudnik, Poland
- Other name: Adam Świerkosz
- Military career
- Allegiance: Polish People's Republic; Poland
- Branch: Polish Air Force
- Service years: 1987–2008
- Rank: brigadier general
- Commands: 31st Tactical Air Base; 32nd Air Base
- Awards: Cross of Merit; Bronze Silver

Adam Mirosław Świerkocz (born 15 December 1964), also spelled Świerkosz, is a Polish military pilot who served as brigadier general in the Polish Air Force.

== Early life ==
Świerkocz was born in Prudnik, Polish People's Republic. He was a member of the Obuwnik Prudnik archery club, as well as a cyclist for Zarzewie Prudnik.

== Education ==
He attended an elementary school in Prudnik. Next, in the years 1979–1983 he was educated at Aviation High School in Zielona Góra. Afterwards he joined the Polish Air Force University, gaining the military rank of flight commander. In 1988, he completed the MiG-21 pilot course at the Aviation Improvement Center.

From 1 February 1995 to 19 August 1997, he studied at the National Defence University of Warsaw. In 2000, he completed postgraduate studies in civil defense and crisis management at the Kazimierz Wielki Academy of Bydgoszcz. From 2000 to 2001, he studied at the Joint Services Command and Staff College in Bracknell, United Kingdom, and from 2006 to 2007 at the Air Force Academy in Maxwell, Iowa.

== Military service ==
As a pilot, he was first sent to the 26th Fighter Aviation Regiment in Zegrze Pomorskie in 1987. On 22 November 1987, he received the rank of second lieutenant. Since July 1993 he was a pilot of the 7th Bomber and Reconnaissance Aviation Regiment in Powidz. After finishing his studies at the National Defence University in 1997, he was appointed the deputy squadron commander of the Powidz Regiment, and later the chief of the regiment's aerial shooting. Since 12 January 2000, he was a deputy commander of the 7th Tactical Squadron.

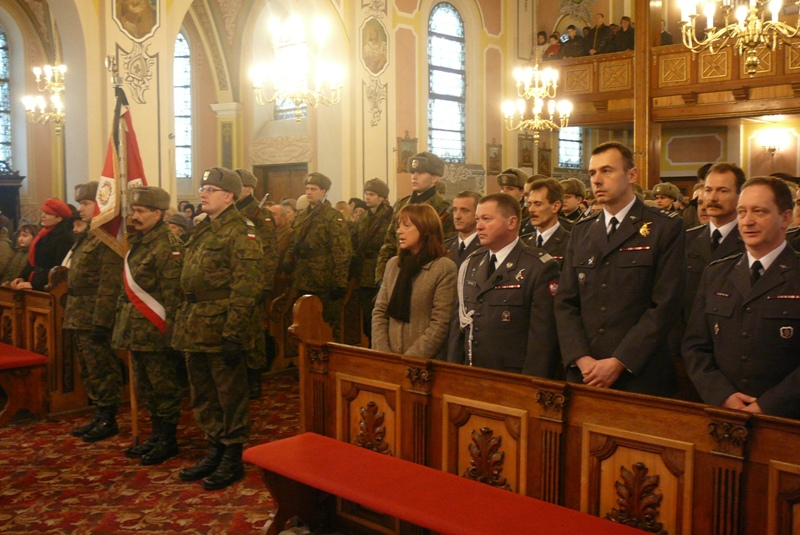
Świerkocz during a commemoration of victims of the 2008 C-295 crash

In the years 2001–2004, Świerkocz was a commander of the 6th Tactical Squadron in Powidz. By the decision of Minister of Defence Jerzy Szmajdziński, on 19 February 2004 Świerkocz took over the duties of a commander of the 32nd Air Base in Łask. He co-organized a Polish-American flight training with a goal to Polish pilots and technicians with the F-16 fighter aircraft. He was the originator of the international Łask-Buczek Air Picnic. On 15 August 2007, President Lech Kaczyński gave him the rank of brigadier general. A day later, on 16 August 2007, he became a commander of the 3rd Transport Aviation Brigade. During his service at that unit, a Polish Air Force C-295 military transport plane crashed in Mirosławiec on 23 January 2008. Świerkocz was on board the plane; he left it about an hour and a half before the crash. On 21 February 2008, Świerkocz was a representative of the Polish Air Force command at the funeral of Robert Kuźma, the commander of the plane. As the commander of the Powidz garrison, Świerkocz initialled an agreement with Krzysztof Ostrowski, a starosta of Gniezno County, on civil-military cooperation in monitoring and preventing crisis situations and eliminating their effects.

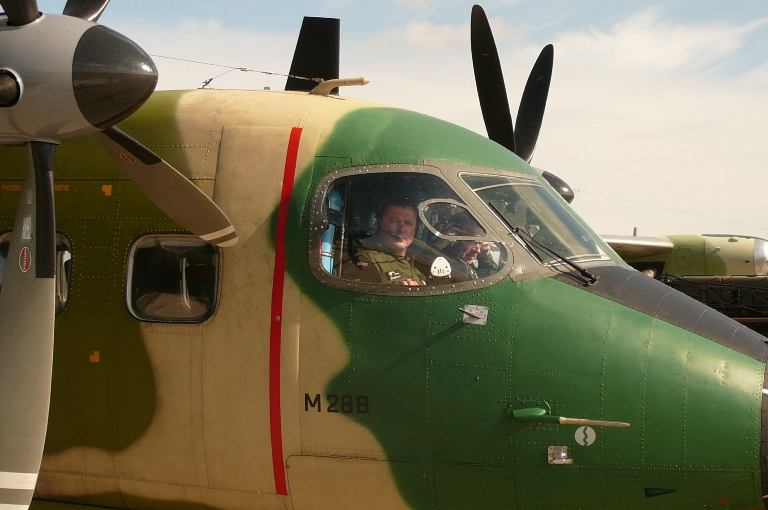
Świerkocz aboard a plane during his farewell flight in 2008

During his military service, Świerkocz flied the MiG-21 and Su-22 fighter planes. He also did introductory flights of F-16 and PZL M28 Skytruck. He took part in training and air exercises in the United States, United Kingdom, Denmark, Norway, Turkey, Greece, and Italy. On 30 May 2008, he went into reserve.

== Personal life ==
Świerkocz has been married twice and has three children. In 2008, he started a consulting company. He lives in Rokietnica, Greater Poland Voivodeship. He also owns a house in his hometown Prudnik.

== Awards ==
- Bronze Cross of Merit (2002)
- Silver Cross of Merit (2005)
