= Wiązogóra =

- Settlement
- Location within Poland
- Coordinates: 54°5′37″N 16°11′5″E
- Country: Poland
- Voivodeship: West Pomeranian
- County: Koszalin
- Gmina: Świeszyno
- Population: 1

Wiązogóra [vjɔ̃zɔˈɡura] is a settlement in the administrative district of Gmina Świeszyno, within Koszalin County, West Pomeranian Voivodeship, in north-western Poland. It lies approximately 4 km (2 mi) south of Świeszyno, 10 km (6 mi) south of Koszalin, and 130 km (81 mi) north-east of the regional capital Szczecin.

For the history of the region, see History of Pomerania.

The settlement has a population of 1.
