= Jarzyce =

- Village
- Location within Poland
- Coordinates: 54°7′30″N 16°7′30″E
- Country: Poland
- Voivodeship: West Pomeranian
- County: Koszalin
- Gmina: Świeszyno
- Population: 50

Jarzyce [jaˈʐɨt͡sɛ] (German: Geritz) is a village in the administrative district of Gmina Świeszyno, within Koszalin County, West Pomeranian Voivodeship, in north-western Poland. It lies approximately 3 km (2 mi) west of Świeszyno, 8 km (5 mi) south-west of Koszalin, and 129 km (80 mi) north-east of the regional capital Szczecin.

For the history of the region, see History of Pomerania.

The village has a population of 50.
