= Strzekęcino =

- Village
- Location within Poland
- Coordinates: 54°6′1″N 16°9′47″E
- Country: Poland
- Voivodeship: West Pomeranian
- County: Koszalin
- Gmina: Świeszyno
- Population: 632

Strzekęcino [stʂɛkɛnˈt͡ɕinɔ] (German: Streckenthin) is a village in the administrative district of Gmina Świeszyno, within Koszalin County, West Pomeranian Voivodeship, in north-western Poland. It lies approximately 3 km (2 mi) south of Świeszyno, 10 km (6 mi) south of Koszalin, and 129 km (80 mi) north-east of the regional capital Szczecin.

For the history of the region, see History of Pomerania.

The village has a population of 632.
