= Kurozwęcz =

- Village
- Location within Poland
- Coordinates: 54°3′16″N 16°16′17″E
- Country: Poland
- Voivodeship: West Pomeranian
- County: Koszalin
- Gmina: Świeszyno
- Population: 134

Kurozwęcz [kuˈrɔzvɛnt͡ʂ] (formerly German Kursewanz) is a village in the administrative district of Gmina Świeszyno, within Koszalin County, West Pomeranian Voivodeship, in north-western Poland. It lies approximately 11 km (7 mi) south-east of Świeszyno, 16 km (10 mi) south of Koszalin, and 132 km (82 mi) north-east of the regional capital Szczecin.

The village has a population of 134.
