= Węgorki, West Pomeranian Voivodeship =

Węgorki
- Settlement
- Location within Poland
- Coordinates: 54°3′28″N 16°10′17″E
- Country: Poland
- Voivodeship: West Pomeranian
- County: Koszalin
- Gmina: Świeszyno
- Population: 28

Węgorki [vɛnˈɡɔrki] is a settlement in the administrative district of Gmina Świeszyno, within Koszalin County, West Pomeranian Voivodeship, in north-western Poland. It lies approximately 8 km (5 mi) south of Świeszyno, 14 km (9 mi) south of Koszalin, and 127 km (79 mi) north-east of the regional capital Szczecin.

For the history of the region, see History of Pomerania.

The settlement has a population of 28.
