= Kępa Świeszyńska =

- Settlement
- Location within Poland
- Coordinates: 54°6′46″N 16°11′54″E
- Country: Poland
- Voivodeship: West Pomeranian
- County: Koszalin
- Gmina: Świeszyno
- Population: 57

Kępa Świeszyńska (Polish: [ˈkɛmpa ɕfjɛˈʂɨj̃ska]; German: Kamp) is a settlement in the administrative district of Gmina Świeszyno, within Koszalin County, West Pomeranian Voivodeship, in north-western Poland.It lies approximately 3 km (2 mi) south-east of Świeszyno, 8 km (5 mi) south of Koszalin, and 132 km (82 mi) north-east of the regional capital Szczecin.

The settlement has a population of 57.
