= Sieranie =

- Village
- Location within Poland
- Coordinates: 54°2′38″N 16°12′0″E
- Country: Poland
- Voivodeship: West Pomeranian
- County: Koszalin
- Gmina: Świeszyno
- Population: 170

Sieranie [ɕɛˈraɲɛ] (German: Zerrehne) is a village in the administrative district of Gmina Świeszyno, within Koszalin County, West Pomeranian Voivodeship, in north-western Poland. It lies approximately 9 km (6 mi) south of Świeszyno, 16 km (10 mi) south of Koszalin, and 128 km (80 mi) north-east of the regional capital Szczecin.

For the history of the region, see History of Pomerania.

The village has a population of 170.
