= Niekłonice =

- Village
- Location within Poland
- Coordinates: 54°9′31″N 16°8′43″E
- Country: Poland
- Voivodeship: West Pomeranian
- County: Koszalin
- Gmina: Świeszyno
- Population: 361

Niekłonice [ɲɛkwɔˈnit͡sɛ] (formerly German Neuklenz) is a village in the administrative district of Gmina Świeszyno, within Koszalin County, West Pomeranian Voivodeship, in north-western Poland. It lies approximately 5 km (3 mi) north of Świeszyno, 4 km (2 mi) south-west of Koszalin, and 132 km (82 mi) north-east of the regional capital Szczecin.

For the history of the region, see History of Pomerania.

The village has a population of 361.
