= Bagno, West Pomeranian Voivodeship =

Bagno
- Settlement
- Location within Poland
- Coordinates: 54°6′32″N 16°11′40″E
- Country: Poland
- Voivodeship: West Pomeranian
- County: Koszalin
- Gmina: Świeszyno
- Population: 49

Bagno [ˈbaɡnɔ] (German: Mittelbruch) is a settlement in the administrative district of Gmina Świeszyno, within Koszalin County, West Pomeranian Voivodeship, in north-western Poland. It lies approximately 3 km (2 mi) south-east of Świeszyno, 9 km (6 mi) south of Koszalin, and 131 km (81 mi) north-east of the regional capital Szczecin.

The settlement has a population of 49.
