= Biała Kępa =

- Settlement
- Location within Poland
- Coordinates: 54°6′34″N 16°9′32″E
- Country: Poland
- Voivodeship: West Pomeranian
- County: Koszalin
- Gmina: Świeszyno
- Population: 10

Biała Kępa [ˈbjawa ˈkɛmpa] (German: Weißkamp) is a settlement in the administrative district of Gmina Świeszyno, within Koszalin County, West Pomeranian Voivodeship, in north-western Poland. It lies approximately 2 km (1 mi) south-west of Świeszyno, 9 km (6 mi) south of Koszalin, and 130 km (81 mi) north-east of the regional capital Szczecin.

The settlement has a population of 10.
