= Niedalino =

- Village
- Location within Poland
- Coordinates: 54°4′0″N 16°9′54″E
- Country: Poland
- Voivodeship: West Pomeranian
- County: Koszalin
- Gmina: Świeszyno
- Population: 500

Niedalino [ɲɛdaˈlinɔ] is a village in the administrative district of Gmina Świeszyno, within Koszalin County, West Pomeranian Voivodeship, in north-western Poland. It lies approximately 7 km (4 mi) south of Świeszyno, 13 km (8 mi) south of Koszalin, and 127 km (79 mi) north-east of the regional capital Szczecin.
