= Erich Ludendorff =

German general and politician (1865–1937)

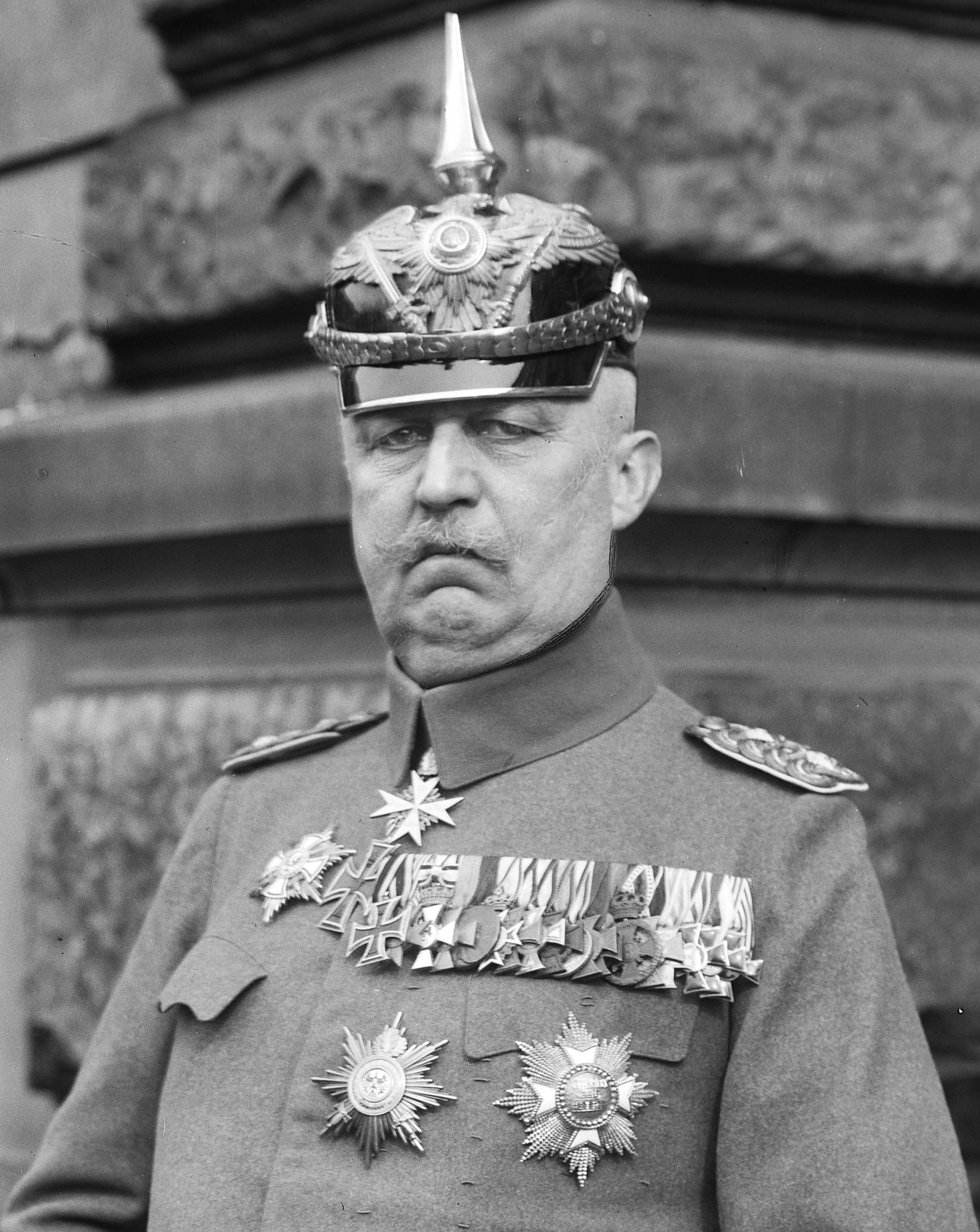
- Ludendorff in 1924

Member of the Reichstag for Reichswahlvorschlag
- In office 27 May 1924 – 1 July 1928
- Preceded by: Multi-member district
- Succeeded by: Multi-member district

First Quartermaster General of the Great General Staff
- In office 29 August 1916 – 26 October 1918
- Superior: Paul von Hindenburg
- Preceded by: Hugo von Freytag-Loringhoven
- Succeeded by: Vacant; Wilhelm Groener (29 October 1918)

Personal details
- Born: Erich Friedrich Wilhelm Ludendorff; 9 April 1865 Kruszewnia, Prussia
- Died: 20 December 1937 (aged 72) Munich, Germany
- Party: DVFP
- Other political affiliations: NSFB (1924–1925)
- Spouses: Margarethe Schmidt (m. 1909; div. 1925) Mathilde von Kemnitz (m. 1925)
- Relatives: Hans Ludendorff (brother); Heinz Pernet (stepson)

Military service
- Allegiance: Germany; Prussia
- Branch/service: Imperial German Army; Prussian Army
- Years of service: 1883–1918
- Rank: General der Infanterie
- Battles/wars: Expand list: World War I; Russian invasion of East Prussia (1914); Battle of Tannenberg; First Battle of the Masurian Lakes; Battle of the Vistula River; Battle of Łódź; Winter Battle of the Masurian Lakes; Battle of Humin-Bolimów; Battle of Łomża; German summer offensive (1915); Bug–Narew offensive; Siege of Novogeorgievsk; Riga–Schaulen offensive; Vilno-Dvinsk offensive; Lake Naroch; Baranovichi offensive; Brusilov offensive; Second Battle of the Somme; German spring offensive; Second Battle of the Marne; Kapp Putsch; Beer Hall Putsch
- Awards: § Decorations and awards

Erich Friedrich Wilhelm Ludendorff (German: [ˈeːʁɪç ˈfʁiːdʁɪç ˈvɪlhɛlm ˈluːdn̩dɔʁf]; 9 April 1865 – 20 December 1937) was a Prussian-born German general and politician. He achieved fame during World War I (1914–1918) for his central role in the German victories at Liège and Tannenberg in 1914. After his appointment as First Quartermaster General of the Great General Staff in 1916, Ludendorff oversaw virtually all decisions regarding Germany's strategy and war effort until the country's defeat in 1918. Later during the years of the Weimar Republic, he took part in the failed 1920 Kapp Putsch and Adolf Hitler's 1923 Beer Hall Putsch, thereby contributing significantly to Adolf Hitler's rise to power.

Ludendorff came from a non-noble family in Kruszewnia in the Prussian Province of Posen. Upon completing his education as a cadet, he was commissioned as a junior officer in 1885. In 1893, he was admitted to the prestigious German War Academy, and only a year later was recommended by its commandant to the General Staff Corps. By 1904, he had rapidly risen in rank to become a member of the Army's Great General Staff, where he helped oversee the development of the Schlieffen Plan.

Despite being removed from the Great General Staff for meddling in politics, Ludendorff restored his standing in the army through his success as a commander in World War I. In August 1914, he led the successful German assault on Liège, earning him the Pour le Mérite. On the Eastern Front under the command of General Paul von Hindenburg, Ludendorff was instrumental in inflicting a series of crushing defeats against the Russians, notably at Tannenberg and the Masurian Lakes.

By the end of August 1916, Ludendorff successfully lobbied for Hindenburg's appointment as head of the Supreme Army Command and his own promotion to the rank of First Quartermaster General. Once he and Hindenburg established a military dictatorship in all but name, Ludendorff directed Germany's entire military strategy and war effort for the rest of the conflict. In this capacity, he secured Russia's defeat on the Eastern Front and launched a new wave of offensives on the Western Front resulting in advances not seen since the war's outbreak. However, by late 1918, all improvements in Germany's fortunes were reversed after a string of defeats culminating in the Allies' Hundred Days Offensive. Faced with the war effort's collapse and a growing popular revolution, Kaiser Wilhelm II forced Ludendorff to resign.

After the war, Ludendorff became a prominent nationalist leader and a promoter of the stab-in-the-back myth, which posited that Germany's defeat and the settlement reached at Versailles were the result of a treasonous conspiracy by Marxists, Freemasons and Jews. He also took part in the failed 1920 Kapp Putsch and 1923 Beer Hall Putsch before unsuccessfully standing in the 1925 election for president. Thereafter, he retired from politics and devoted his final years to the study of military theory. His most famous work in this field was The Total War, where he argued that a nation's entire physical and moral resources should remain forever poised for mobilisation because peace was merely an interval in a never-ending chain of wars. Following his death from liver cancer in Munich in 1937, Ludendorff was given—against his explicit wishes—a state funeral organised and attended by Hitler.

== Early life ==
Erich Friedrich Wilhelm Ludendorff was born on 9 April 1865 in Kruszewnia near Posen, in the Province of Posen and Kingdom of Prussia (now Greater Poland Voivodeship, Poland), the third of six children of August Wilhelm Ludendorff (1833–1905). His father was descended from Pomeranian merchants who had been raised to the status of a Junker.

Erich's mother, Klara Jeanette Henriette von Tempelhoff (1840–1914), was the daughter of the noble but impoverished Friedrich August Napoleon von Tempelhoff (1804–1868) and his wife Jeannette Wilhelmine von Dziembowska (1816–1854), who came from a Germanised Polish landed family on the side of her father Stephan von Dziembowski (1779–1859). Through Dziembowski's wife Johanna Wilhelmine von Unruh (1793–1862), Erich was a remote descendant of the Counts of Dönhoff, the Dukes of Liegnitz and Brieg and the Margraves and Electors of Brandenburg.

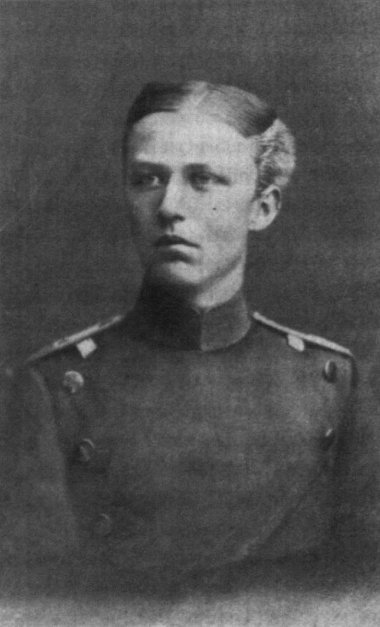
Ludendorff at the age of 17 in 1882

Ludendorff had a stable and comfortable childhood, growing up on a small family farm. He received his early schooling from a maternal aunt and had a gift for mathematics, as did his younger brother Hans, who became a distinguished astronomer. Upon passing the entrance exam for the Cadet School at Plön with distinction, he was put in a class two years ahead of his age group, and thereafter he was consistently first in his class. The famous World War II General Heinz Guderian attended the same Cadet School, which produced many well-trained German officers. Ludendorff's education continued at the Hauptkadettenschule at Groß-Lichterfelde near Berlin through to 1882.

== Pre-war military career ==
In 1885, Ludendorff was commissioned as a subaltern into the 57th Infantry Regiment, then at Wesel. Over the next eight years, he was promoted to lieutenant and saw further service in the 2nd Marine Battalion, based at Kiel and Wilhelmshaven, and in the 8th Grenadier Guards at Frankfurt on the Oder. His service reports reveal the highest praise, with frequent commendations. In 1893, he entered the War Academy, where the commandant, General Meckel, recommended him to the General Staff, to which he was appointed in 1894. He rose rapidly and was a senior staff officer at the headquarters of V Corps from 1902 to 1904.

Next, he joined the Great General Staff in Berlin, which was commanded by Alfred von Schlieffen, Ludendorff directed the Second or Mobilisation Section from 1904 to 1913. Soon, he was joined by Max Bauer, a brilliant artillery officer, who became a close friend.

In 1910, at age 45, "the old sinner, as he liked to hear himself called" married the daughter of a wealthy factory owner, Margarethe Schmidt (1875–1936). They met in a rainstorm when he offered his umbrella. She divorced to marry him, bringing three stepsons and a stepdaughter. Their marriage pleased both families and he was devoted to his stepchildren.

By 1911, Ludendorff was a full colonel. His section was responsible for writing the mass of detailed orders needed to bring the mobilized troops into position to implement the Schlieffen Plan. For this, they covertly surveyed frontier fortifications in Russia, France and Belgium. For instance, in 1911, Ludendorff visited the key Belgian fortress city of Liège. Before the war, he was an Oberst in the General Staff who studied the march route of the army in case of war.

Deputies of the Social Democratic Party of Germany, which became the largest party in the Reichstag after the German federal elections of 1912, seldom gave priority to army expenditures, whether to build up its reserves or to fund advanced weaponry such as Krupp's siege cannons. Instead, they preferred to concentrate military spending on the Imperial German Navy. Ludendorff's calculations showed that to properly implement the Schlieffen Plan, the Army lacked six corps.

Members of the General Staff were instructed to keep out of politics and the public eye, but Ludendorff shrugged off such restrictions. With a retired general, August Keim, and the head of the Pan-German League, Heinrich Class, he vigorously lobbied the Reichstag for the additional men. In 1913 funding was approved for four additional corps but Ludendorff was transferred to regimental duties as commander of the 39th (Lower Rhine) Fusiliers, stationed at Düsseldorf. "I attributed the change partly to my having pressed for those three additional army corps."

Barbara Tuchman characterizes Ludendorff in her book The Guns of August as Schlieffen's devoted disciple who was a glutton for work and a man of granite character but who was deliberately friendless and forbidding and therefore remained little known or liked. It is true that as his wife testified, "Anyone who knows Ludendorff knows that he has not a spark of humor [...]". He was voluble nonetheless, although he shunned small talk. John Lee states that while Ludendorff was with his Fusiliers, "he became the perfect regimental commander [...] the younger officers came to adore him." His adjutant, Wilhelm Breucker, became a devoted lifelong friend.

== World War I ==
=== Battle of Liège ===
At the outbreak of war in the summer of 1914, Ludendorff was appointed Deputy Chief of Staff to the German Second Army under General Karl von Bülow. His assignment was largely due to his previous work investigating defenses of Liège, Belgium. At the beginning of the Battle of Liège, Ludendorff was an observer with the 14th Brigade, which was to infiltrate the city at night and secure the bridges before they could be destroyed. The brigade commander was killed on 5 August, so Ludendorff led the successful assault to occupy the city and its citadel. In the following days, two of the forts guarding the city were taken by desperate frontal infantry attacks, while the remaining forts were smashed by huge Krupp 42-cm and Austro-Hungarian Škoda 30.5-cm howitzers. By 16 August, all the forts around Liège had fallen, allowing the German First Army to advance. As the victor of Liège, Ludendorff was awarded Germany's highest military decoration for gallantry, the Pour le Mérite, presented by Kaiser Wilhelm II himself on 22 August.

=== Command in the East ===
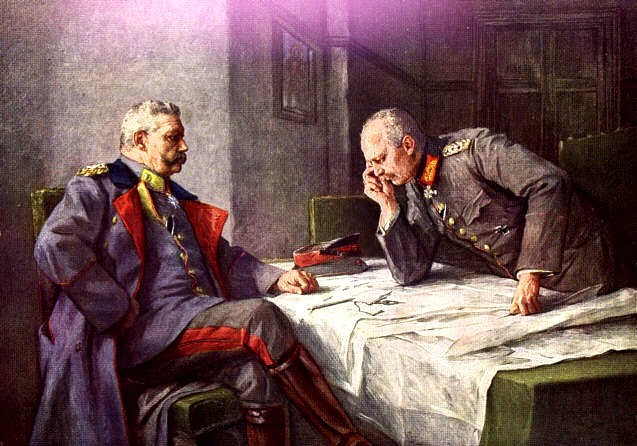
Hindenburg (seated) and Ludendorff. Painting by Hugo Vogel

German mobilisation earmarked a single army, the Eighth, to defend its eastern frontier. When two Russian armies invaded East Prussia earlier than expected, the command of the Eighth Army, Maximilian von Prittwitz with Georg von Waldersee as Chief of Staff, performed poorly and reportedly panicked. They accordingly were dismissed from command by the Oberste Heeresleitung (OHL), the German Supreme Army Command. The War Cabinet chose a retired general, Paul von Hindenburg, as commander, while the OHL assigned Ludendorff as his new chief of staff. Hindenburg and Ludendorff first met on their private train heading east. They agreed that they must annihilate the nearest Russian army before they tackled the second. On arrival, they discovered that Max Hoffmann had already shifted much of the 8th Army by rail to the south to do just that, in an amazing feat of logistical planning. Nine days later, the Eighth Army surrounded most of a Russian army at Tannenberg, taking 92,000 prisoners in one of the greatest victories in German history. Twice during the battle, Ludendorff wanted to break off, fearing that the second Russian army was about to strike their rear, but Hindenburg held firm.

The Germans turned on the second invading army in the Battle of the Masurian Lakes; it fled with heavy losses to escape encirclement. During the rest of 1914, commanding an Army Group, Hindenburg and Ludendorff staved off the projected invasion of German Silesia by dexterously moving their outnumbered forces into Russian Poland, fighting the battle of the Vistula River, which ended with a brilliantly executed withdrawal during which they destroyed the Polish railway lines and bridges needed for an invasion. When the Russians had repaired most of the damage, the Germans struck their flank in the battle of Łódź, where they almost surrounded another Russian army. Masters of surprise and deft maneuver, the pair argued that if properly reinforced, they could trap the entire Russian army in Poland. During the winter of 1914–1915, they lobbied passionately for this strategy, but were rebuffed by the OHL.

Early in 1915, Hindenburg and Ludendorff surprised the Russian army that still held a toehold in East Prussia by attacking in a snowstorm and surrounding it in the Second Battle of the Masurian Lakes. The OHL then transferred Ludendorff, but Hindenburg's personal plea to the Kaiser reunited them. Erich von Falkenhayn, supreme commander at the OHL, came east to attack the flank of the Russian army that was pushing through the Carpathian passes towards Hungary. Employing overwhelming artillery, the Germans and Austro-Hungarians broke through the line between Gorlice and Tarnów and kept pushing until the Russians were driven out of most of Galicia, in Austro-Hungarian Poland. During this advance, Falkenhayn rejected schemes to try to cut off the Russians in Poland, preferring direct frontal attacks like Bug–Narew Offensive. Outgunned, during the summer of 1915, the Russian commander Grand Duke Nicholas shortened his lines by withdrawing from most of Poland, destroying railroads, bridges, and many buildings while driving 743,000 Poles, 350,000 Jews, 300,000 Lithuanians and 250,000 Latvians were deported to Russia.

During the winter of 1915–1916, Ludendorff's headquarters was in Kaunas. The Germans occupied present-day Lithuania, western Latvia, and north eastern Poland, an area almost the size of France. Ludendorff demanded Germanisation of the conquered territories and far-ranging annexations, offering land to German settlers; see Drang nach Osten. Far-reaching plans envisioned Courland and Lithuania turned into border states ruled by German military governors answerable only to the Kaiser. He proposed massive annexations and colonisation in Eastern Europe in the event of the victory of the German Reich, and was one of the main supporters of the Polish Border Strip. Ludendorff planned to combine German settlement and Germanisation in conquered areas with expulsions of native populations; and envisioned an eastern German empire whose resources would be used in future war with Great Britain and the United States Ludendorff's plans went as far as making Crimea a German colony. As to the various nations and ethnic groups in conquered territories, Ludendorff believed they were "incapable of producing real culture"

On 16 March 1916, the Russians, now with adequate supplies of cannons and shells, attacked parts of the new German defenses, intending to penetrate at two points and then to pocket the defenders. They attacked almost daily until the end of the month, but the Lake Naroch Offensive failed, "choked in swamp and blood".

The Russians did better attacking the Austro-Hungarians in the south; the Brusilov Offensive cracked their lines with a well-prepared surprise wide-front attack led by well-schooled assault troops. The breakthrough was finally stemmed by Austro-Hungarian troops recalled from Italy, stiffened with German advisers and reserves. In July, Russian attacks on the Germans in the north were beaten back. On 27 July 1916, Hindenburg was given command of all troops on the Eastern Front from the Baltic to Brody in Ukraine. Ludendorff and Hindenburg visited their new command on a special train and then set up headquarters in Brest-Litovsk. By August 1916, their front was holding everywhere.

=== Promotion to First Quartermaster-General ===
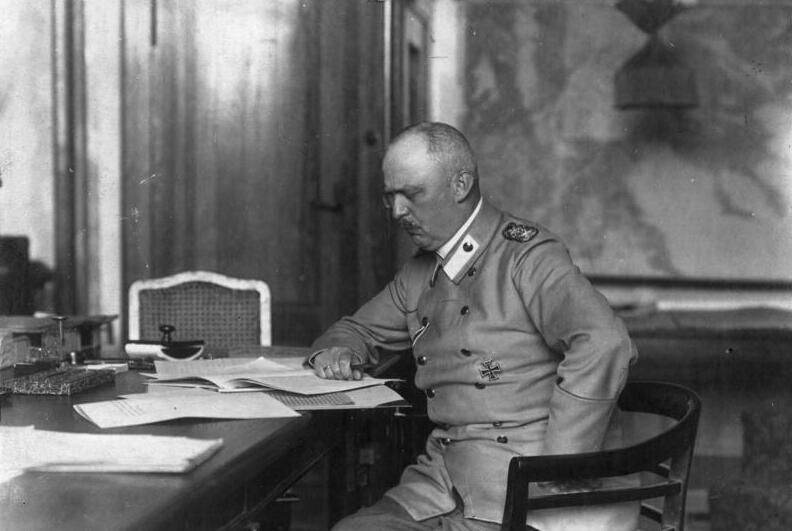
Ludendorff in his study at the General Headquarters, 1918

In the West in 1916, the Germans attacked unsuccessfully at Verdun and soon were reeling under British and French blows along the Somme. Ludendorff's friends at the OHL, led by Max Bauer, lobbied for him relentlessly. The balance was tipped when Romania entered the war on the side of the Entente, thrusting into Hungary. Falkenhayn was replaced as Chief of the General Staff by Hindenburg on 29 August 1916. Ludendorff was again his chief of staff as first Quartermaster general, with the stipulation that he would have joint responsibility. He was promoted to General of the Infantry. Chancellor Bethmann Hollweg warned the War Cabinet: "You don't know Ludendorff, who is only great at a time of success. If things go badly, he loses his nerve."

Their first concern was the sizable Romanian Army, so troops sent from the Western Front checked Romanian and Russian incursions into Hungary. Then Romania was invaded from the south by German, Austro-Hungarian, Bulgarian, and Ottoman troops commanded by August von Mackensen and from the north by a German and Austro-Hungarian army commanded by Falkenhayn. Bucharest fell in December 1916. According to Mackensen, Ludendorff's distant management consisted of "floods of telegrams, as superfluous as they were offensive."

When sure that the Romanians would be defeated, the OHL moved west, retaining the previous staff except for the operations officer, blamed for Verdun. They toured the Western Front meeting — and evaluating — commanders, learning about their problems and soliciting their opinions. At each meeting, Ludendorff did most of the talking for Hindenburg. There would be no further attacks at Verdun and the Somme would be defended by revised tactics that exposed fewer men to British shells. A new backup defensive line would be built, like the one they had constructed in the east. The Allies would call the new fortifications the Hindenburg Line. The German goal was victory, which they defined as a Germany with extended borders that could be more easily defended in the next war.

Hindenburg was given titular command over all of the forces of the Central Powers. Ludendorff's hand was everywhere. Every day he was on the telephone with the staff of their armies and the Army was deluged with "Ludendorff's paper barrage" of orders, instructions and demands for information. His finger extended into every aspect of the German war effort. He issued the two daily communiques and often met with the newspaper and newsreel reporters. Before long, the public idolised him as the German Army's brain. Historian and correspondent William L. Shirer later called him "virtually dictator of Germany from 1916 until the defeat."

=== The Home Front ===
Ludendorff had a goal: "One thing was certain — the power must be in my hands." As stipulated by the Constitution of the German Empire, the government was run by civil servants appointed by the Kaiser. Confident that army officers were superior to civilians, the OHL volunteered to oversee the economy: procurement, raw materials, labor, and food. Max Bauer, with his industrialist friends, began by setting overambitious targets for military production in what they called the Hindenburg Program. Ludendorff enthusiastically participated in meetings on economic policy — loudly, sometimes pummeling the table with his fists. Implementation of the Program was assigned to General Wilhelm Groener, a staff officer who had directed the Field Railway Service effectively. His office was in the (civilian) War Ministry, not in the OHL as Ludendorff had wanted. Therefore, he assigned staff officers to most government ministries, so he knew what was going on and could press his demands.

The war industry's major problem was the scarcity of skilled workers; therefore, 125,000 men were released from the armed forces and trained workers were no longer conscripted. The OHL wanted to enroll most German men and women into national service, but the Reichstag legislated that only males 17–60 were subject to "patriotic service" and refused to bind war workers to their jobs. Groener realised that they needed the support of the workers, so he insisted that union representatives be included on industrial dispute boards. He also advocated an excess profits tax. The industrialists were incensed. On 16 August 1917, Ludendorff telegraphed an order reassigning Groener to command the 33rd Infantry Division. Overall, "unable to control labour and unwilling to control industry, the army failed miserably". To the public, it seemed that Ludendorff was running the nation as well as the war. According to Ludendorff, "the authorities [...] represented me as a dictator". He would not become Chancellor because the demands for running the war were too great. The historian Frank Tipton argues that while not technically a dictator, Ludendorff was "unquestionably the most powerful man in Germany" in 1917–1918.

The OHL did nothing to mitigate the crisis of growing food shortages in Germany. Despite the Allied blockade, everyone could have been fed adequately, but supplies were not managed effectively or fairly. In spring 1918, half of all the meat, eggs, and fruit consumed in Berlin were sold on the black market.

=== In government ===
The Navy advocated unrestricted submarine warfare, which would surely bring the United States into the war. At the Kaiser's request, his commanders met with his friend, the eminent chemist Walther Nernst, who knew America well, and who warned against the idea. Ludendorff promptly ended the meeting; it was "incompetent nonsense with which a civilian was wasting his time." Unrestricted submarine warfare began in February 1917, with the OHL's strong support. This fatal mistake reflected poor military judgment in uncritically accepting the Navy's contention that there were no effective potential countermeasures, like convoying, and confidence that the American armed forces were too feeble to fight effectively. By the end of the war, Germany would be at war with 27 nations.

Ludendorff, with the Kaiser's blessing, helped Lenin and other 30 or so revolutionaries in exile return to Russia. Ludendorff agreed to send the Bolsheviks in Switzerland by train through Germany, from where they would then travel to Russia via Sweden. Lenin, however, still took some convincing, insisting that he be sent on a sealed train. Lenin ultimately agreed on 31 March, and would depart Switzerland on 8 April.

In the spring of 1917, the Reichstag passed a resolution for peace without annexations or indemnities. They would be content with the successful defensive war undertaken in 1914. The OHL was unable to defeat the resolution or to have it substantially watered down. The commanders despised Chancellor Bethmann Hollweg as weak, so they forced his resignation by repeatedly threatening to resign themselves, despite the Kaiser's admonition that this was not their business. Bethmann Hollweg was replaced by a minor functionary, Georg Michaelis, the food minister, who announced that he would deal with the resolution as "in his own fashion". Despite this put-down, the Reichstag voted the financial credits needed for continuing the war.

Following the overthrow of Tsar Nicholas II of Russia, the new Russian government launched the Kerensky Offensive in July 1917, attacking the Austro-Hungarian lines in Galicia. After minor successes, the Russians were driven back and many of their soldiers refused to fight. The counterattack was halted only after the line was pushed 240 kilometres (150 mi) eastwards. The Germans capped the year in the East by capturing the strong Russian fortress of Riga in September 1917, starting with a brief, overwhelming artillery barrage using many gas shells, then followed by infiltrating infantry. The Bolsheviks seized power in November and soon were at the peace table.

Ludendorff insisted on the huge territorial losses forced on Russia in the Treaty of Brest-Litovsk, even though this required that a million German soldiers remain in the east. During the peace negotiations with Russia, his representative kept demanding the economic concessions coveted by German industrialists. The commanders kept blocking attempts to frame a plausible peace offer to the Western powers by insisting on borders expanded for future defense. Ludendorff regarded the Germans as the "master race" and after victory, planned to settle ex-soldiers in the Baltic states and in Alsace-Lorraine, where they would take over property seized from Balts and the French. One after another, the OHL toppled government ministers they regarded as weak.

=== Western Front (1916–1917) ===
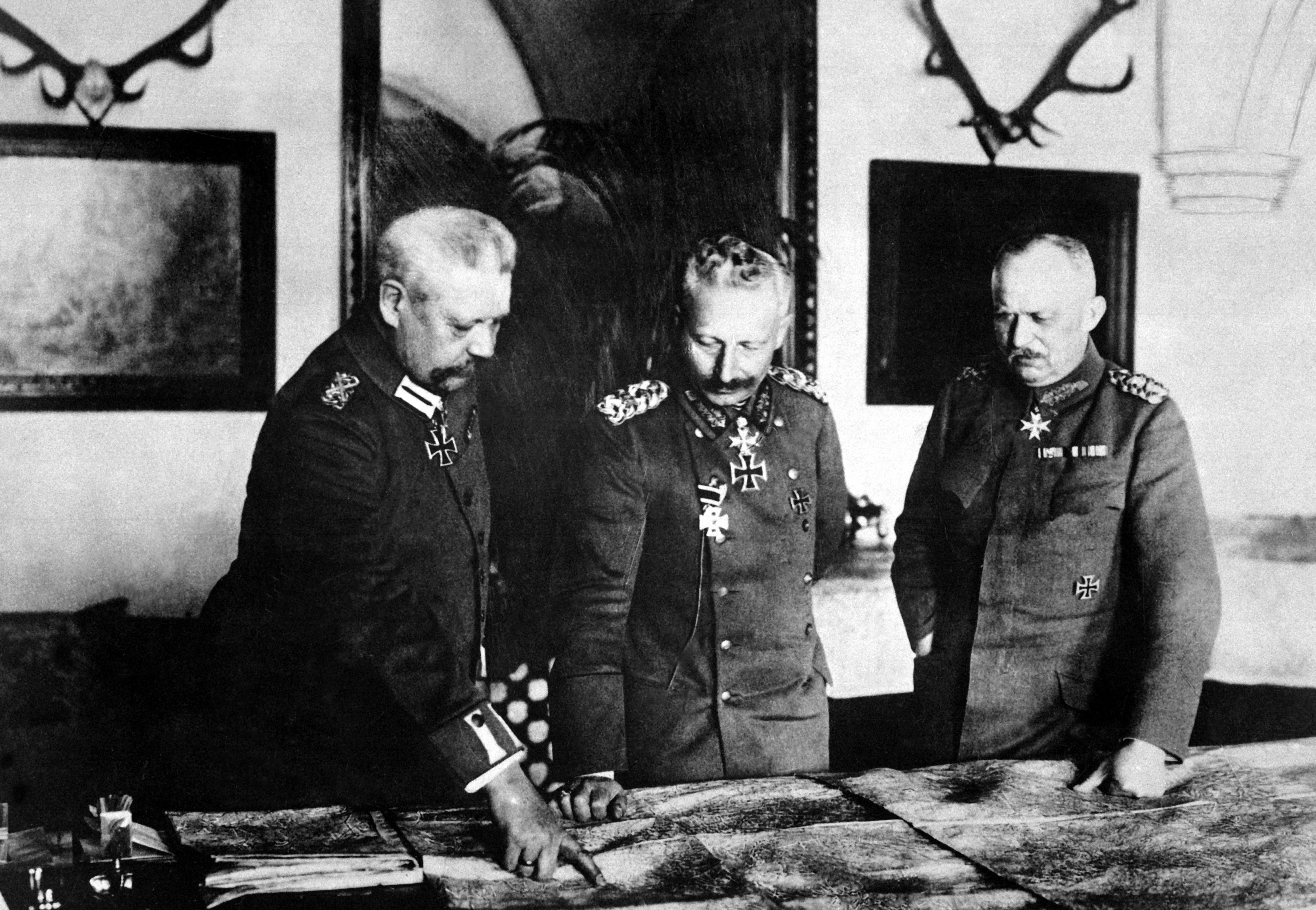
Hindenburg, Kaiser Wilhelm II, and Ludendorff, January 1917

In contrast to the OHL's questionable interventions in politics and diplomacy, their armies continued to excel. The commanders would agree on what was to be done and then Ludendorff and the OHL staff produced the mass of orders specifying exactly what was to be accomplished. On the western front, they stopped packing defenders in the front line, which reduced losses to enemy artillery. They issued a directive on elastic defense, in which attackers who penetrated a lightly held front line entered a battle zone in which they were punished by artillery and counterattacks. It remained German Army doctrine through World War II; schools taught the new tactics to all ranks. Its effectiveness is illustrated by comparing the first half of 1916, in which 77 German soldiers died or went missing for every 100 British, to the second half, when 55 Germans were lost for every 100 British.

By February 1917, the OHL was sure that the new French commander, General Robert Nivelle, would attack, and correctly foresaw that he would try to pinch off the German salient between Arras and Noyon. So the OHL withdrew German forces to the segment of the Hindenburg line across the base of the salient in Operation Alberich, leaving the ground they gave up as a depopulated waste land. The Nivelle Offensive in April 1917 was blunted by mobile defense in depth. Many French units mutinied, though the OHL never grasped the extent of the disarray.

The British supported their allies with a successful attack near Arras and had another success in June 1917 at Messines Ridge in Flanders. Then at the end of July 1917, the British attacked Passchendaele Ridge. At first, the defense was directed by General von Lossberg, a pioneer in defense in depth, but when the British adjusted their tactics, Ludendorff took over day-to-day control. The British eventually took Passchendaele Ridge at great cost.

Ludendorff worried about declining morale, so in July 1917, OHL established a propaganda unit. In October 1917, they began mandatory patriotic lectures to the troops, who were assured that if the war was lost, they would "become slaves of international capital". The lecturers were to "ensure that a fight is kept up against all agitators, croakers, and weaklings".

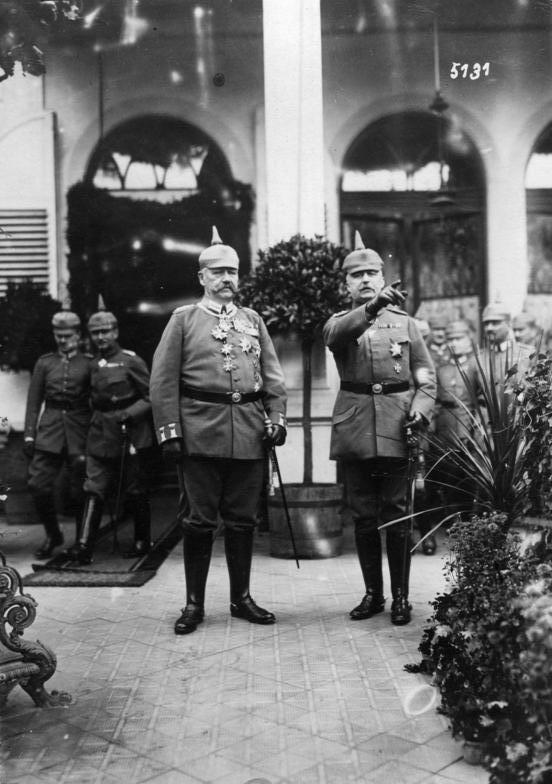
Hindenburg and Ludendorff (pointing), October 1917

To bolster the wobbling Austro-Hungarian government, the Germans provided some troops and led a joint attack in Italy in October. They sliced through the Italian lines in the mountains at Caporetto. Two hundred and fifty thousand Italians were captured and the rest of the Italian Army was forced to retreat to the Grappa-Piave defensive line.

On 20 November 1917, the British achieved a total surprise by attacking at Cambrai. A short, intense bombardment preceded an attack by tanks, which led the infantry through the German wire. It was Ludendorff's 52nd birthday, but he was too upset to attend the celebratory dinner. The British were not organized to exploit their breakthrough, and German reserves counterattacked, in some places driving the British back beyond their starting lines.

At the beginning of 1918, almost a million munition workers struck; one demand was peace without annexations. OHL ordered that "all strikers fit to bear arms be sent to the front, thereby degrading military service."

=== Western Front (1918) ===
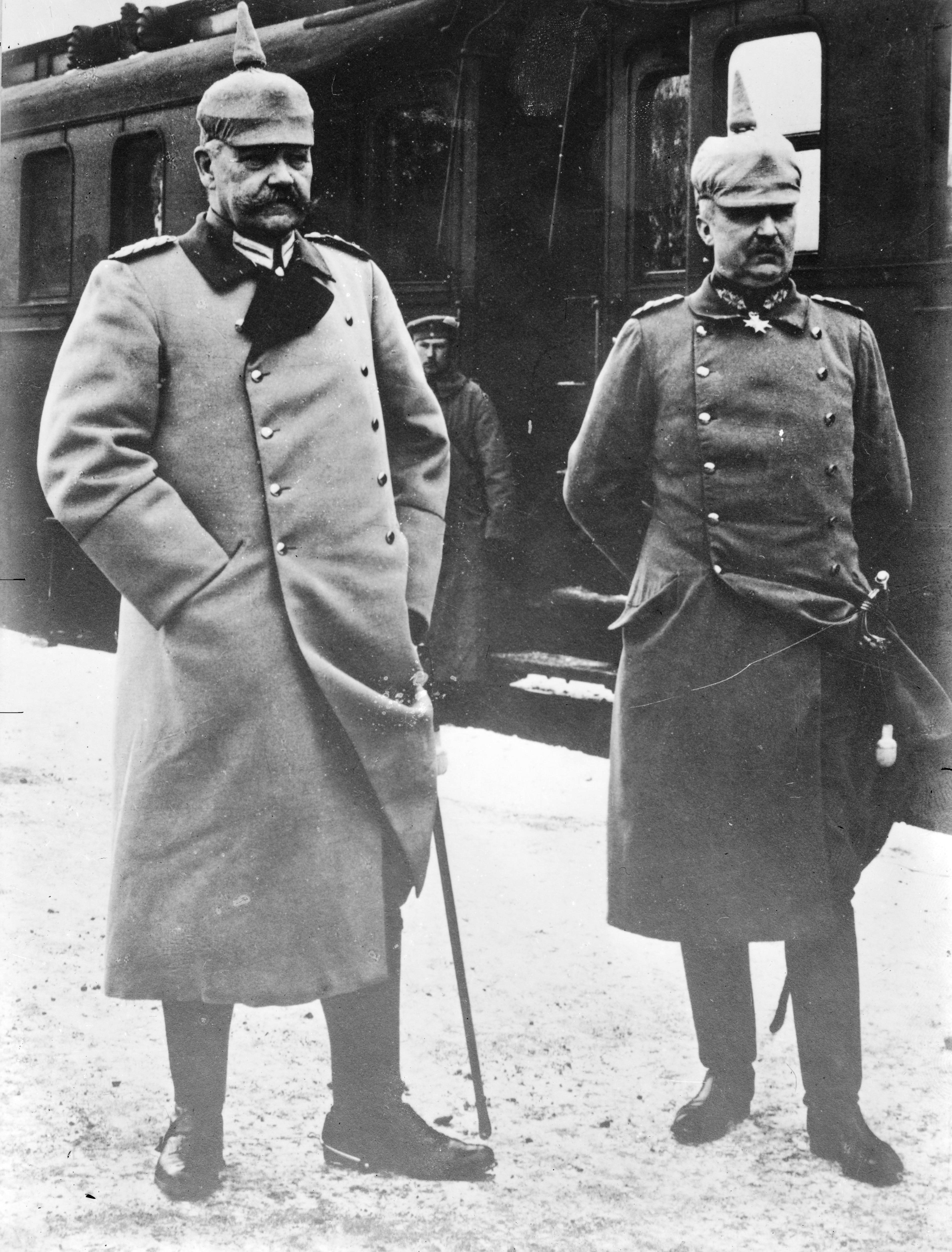
Hindenburg and Ludendorff in 1918

With Russia out of the war, the Germans outnumbered the Allies on the Western Front. After extensive consultations, OHL planned a series of attacks to drive the British out of the war. During the winter, all ranks were schooled in the innovative tactics proven at Caporetto and Riga. The first attack, Operation Michael, was on 21 March 1918 near Cambrai. His infiltration tactics during this campaign have been lauded as military genius. After an effective hurricane bombardment coordinated by Colonel Bruchmüller, they slashed through the British lines, surmounting the obstacles that had thwarted their enemies for three years. On the first day, they occupied as large an area as the Allies had won on the Somme after 140 days. The Allies were aghast, but it was not the triumph OHL had hoped for: they had planned another Tannenberg by surrounding tens of thousands of British troops in the Cambrai salient, but had been thwarted by stout defense and fighting withdrawal. They lost as many men as the defenders — the first day was the bloodiest of the war. Among the dead was Ludendorff's oldest stepson; a younger had been killed earlier. The Germans were unable to cut any vital railway. When Ludendorff motored near the front, he was displeased by seeing how: "The numerous slightly wounded made things difficult by the stupid and displeasing way in which they hurried to the rear." The Americans doubled the number of troops being sent to France.

Their next attack was in Flanders. Again, they broke through, advancing 30 km (19 mi), and forcing the British to give back all of the ground that they had won the preceding year after weeks of battle. But the Germans were stopped short of the rail junction that was their goal. Next, to draw French reserves south, they struck along the Chemin des Dames. In their most successful attack yet, they advanced 12 km (7.5 mi) on the first day, crossing the Marne but stopping 56 kilometres (35 mi) from Paris. However, each German triumph weakened their army and its morale. From 20 March 1918 to 25 June, the German front lengthened from 390 kilometres (240 mi) to 510 kilometres (320 mi).

Then the Germans struck near Reims to seize additional railway lines for use in the salient, but were foiled by brilliant French elastic tactics. Undeterred, on 18 July 1918, Ludendorff, still "aggressive and confident", traveled to Flanders to confer about the next attack there. A telephone call reported that the French and Americans, led by a mass of tanks, had smashed through the right flank of their salient pointing toward Paris, on the opening day of the Battle of Soissons. Everyone present realized that surely they had lost the war. Ludendorff was shattered.

OHL began to withdraw step by step to new defensive lines, first evacuating all of their wounded and supplies. Ludendorff's communiques, which hitherto had been largely factual, now distorted the news, for instance, claiming that American troops had to be herded onto troop ships by special police.

On 8 August 1918, the Germans were completely surprised at Amiens when British tanks broke through the defenses and intact German formations surrendered. To Ludendorff, it was the "black day in the history of the German Army". The German retreats continued, pressed by Allied attacks. OHL still vigorously opposed offering to give up the territory they desired in France and Belgium, so the German government was unable to make a plausible peace proposal.

Ludendorff became increasingly cantankerous, railing at his staff without cause, publicly accusing Hindenburg of talking nonsense, and sometimes bursting into tears. Bauer wanted him replaced, but instead a doctor, Oberstabarzt Hochheimer, was brought to OHL. He had worked closely with Ludendorff in Poland during the winter of 1915–1916 on plans to bring in German colonists. Before the war, he had a practice in nervous diseases. Hochheimer "spoke as a friend and he listened as a friend", convincing Ludendorff that he could not work effectively with one hour of sleep a night and that he must relearn how to relax. After a month away from headquarters, Ludendorff had recovered from the severest symptoms of battle fatigue.

=== Downfall ===
On 29 September 1918, Ludendorff and Hindenburg suddenly told an incredulous Kaiser that they could not guarantee the integrity of the Western front "for two hours", and they must have an immediate armistice. A new Chancellor, Prince Maximilian of Baden, approached President Woodrow Wilson, but Wilson's terms were unacceptable to the German leadership, and so the German army fought on. The chancellor told the Kaiser that he and his cabinet would resign unless Ludendorff was removed, but that Hindenburg must remain to hold the army together. The Kaiser called his commanders in, curtly accepting Ludendorff's resignation and then rejecting Hindenburg's. Fuming, Ludendorff would not accompany the field marshal back to headquarters: "I refused to ride with you because you have treated me so shabbily".

Ludendorff had assiduously sought all of the credit; now he was rewarded with all of the blame. Widely despised, and with revolution breaking out, he was hidden by his brother and a network of friends until he slipped out of Germany disguised in blue spectacles and a false beard and a fake Finnish passport, settling in a Swedish admirer's country home until the Swedish government asked him to leave in February 1919. Within seven months, he wrote two volumes of detailed memoirs. Friends, led by Breucker, provided him with documents and negotiated with publishers. Groener (who is not mentioned in the book) characterized it as a showcase of his "caesar-mania". He was a brilliant general, according to John Wheeler-Bennett, stating that he was "certainly one of the greatest routine military organizers that the world has ever seen", but he also said he was a ruinous political meddler. The influential military analyst Hans Delbrück concluded that "The Empire was built by Moltke and Bismarck, destroyed by Tirpitz and Ludendorff."

== After the Great War ==
In exile, Ludendorff wrote numerous books and articles about the German military's conduct of the war while forming the foundation for the Dolchstosslegende, the "stab-in-the-back theory," for which he is considered largely responsible, insisting that a domestic crisis had sparked Germany's surrender while the military situation held firm, ignoring that he himself had pressed the politicians for an armistice on military grounds. Ludendorff was convinced that Germany had fought a defensive war and, in his opinion, that Kaiser Wilhelm II had failed to organise a proper counter-propaganda campaign or provide efficient leadership.

Ludendorff was extremely suspicious of the Social Democrats and leftists, whom he blamed for the humiliation of Germany through the Versailles Treaty. Ludendorff claimed that he paid close attention to the business element (especially the Jews) and saw them turn their backs on the war effort by — as he saw it — letting profit, rather than patriotism, dictate production and financing.

Again focusing on the left, Ludendorff was appalled by the strikes that took place towards the end of the war and the way that the home front collapsed before the military front did, with the former poisoning the morale of soldiers on temporary leave. Most importantly, Ludendorff felt that the German people as a whole had underestimated what was at stake in the war; he was convinced that the Entente had started the war and was determined to dismantle Germany completely.

Ludendorff wrote:

By the Revolution, the Germans have made themselves pariahs among the nations, incapable of winning allies, helots in the service of foreigners and foreign capital, and deprived of all self-respect. In twenty years' time, the German people will curse the parties who now boast of having made the Revolution.

— Erich Ludendorff, My War Memories, 1914–1918

== Political career in the Republic ==
Ludendorff returned to Berlin in February 1919. Staying at the Hotel Adlon, he talked with another resident, Sir Neill Malcolm, the head of the British Military Mission. After Ludendorff presented his excuses for the German defeat, Malcolm said, "You mean that you were stabbed in the back?" — coined a key catchphrase for the German right wing.

On 12 March 1920, 5,000 Freikorps troops under the command of Walther von Lüttwitz marched on the Chancellery, forcing the government led by Friedrich Ebert and Gustav Bauer to flee the city. The putschists proclaimed a new government with a right-wing politician, Wolfgang Kapp as the new "chancellor". Ludendorff and Max Bauer were part of the putsch. The Kapp Putsch was soon defeated by a general strike that brought Berlin to a standstill. The leaders fled, Ludendorff to Bavaria, where a right-wing coup had succeeded. He published two volumes of annotated — and in a few instances pruned — documents and commentaries documenting his war service. He reconciled with Hindenburg, who began to visit every year.

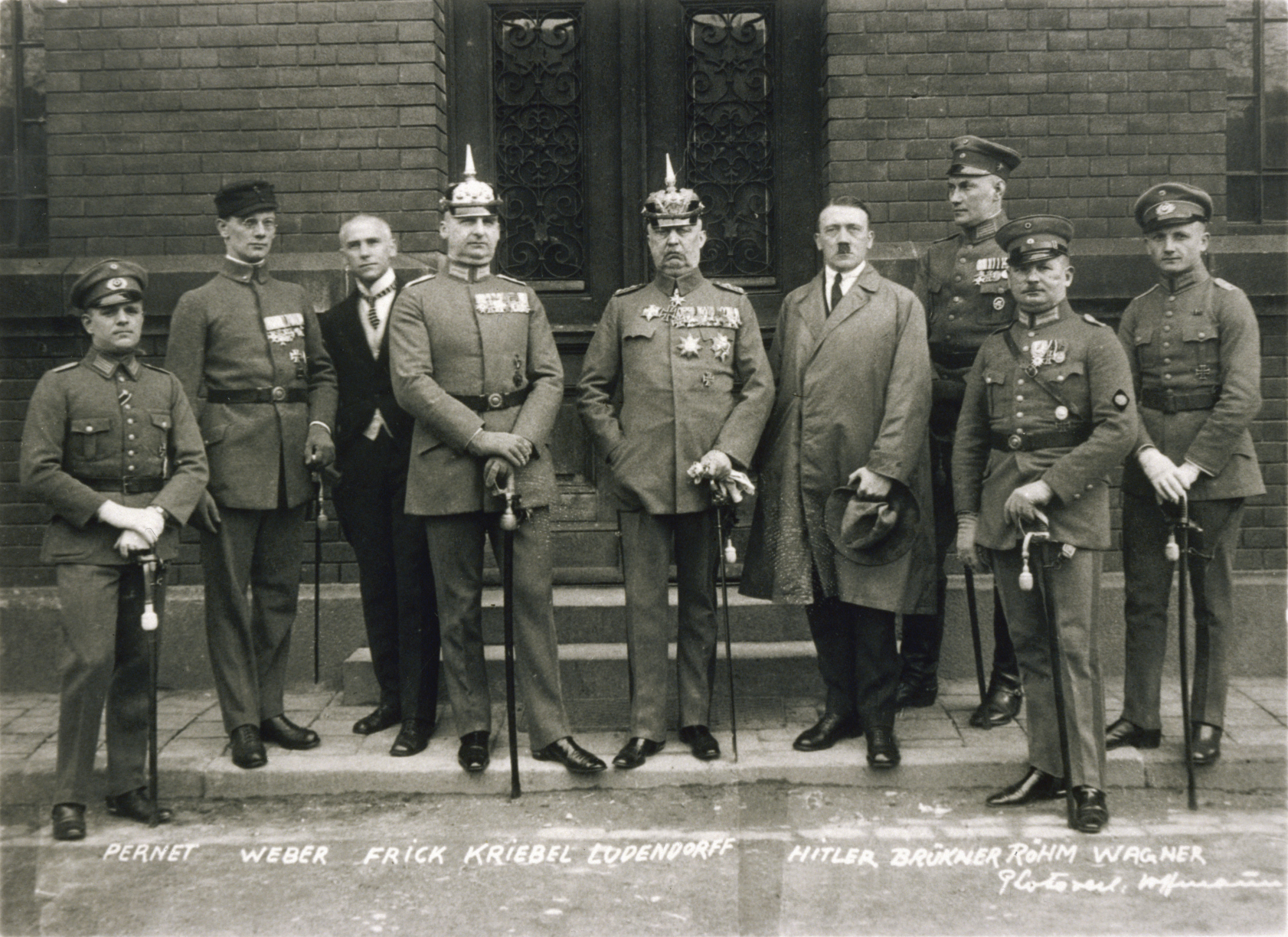
Ludendorff (center) with Hitler and other early Nazi leaders and prominent radical German nationalists, April 1924

In May 1923, Ludendorff had an agreeable first meeting with Adolf Hitler, and soon he had regular contact with the Nazis. On 8 November 1923, the Bavarian Staatskommissar Gustav von Kahr was addressing a jammed meeting in a large beer hall, the Bürgerbräukeller. Hitler, waving a pistol, jumped onto the stage, announcing that the national revolution was underway. The hall was occupied by armed men who covered the audience with a machine gun, the first move in the Beer Hall Putsch. Hitler announced that he would lead the Reich Government and Ludendorff would command the army. He addressed the now enthusiastically supportive audience and then spent the night in the War Ministry, unsuccessfully trying to obtain the army's backing. The next morning, 3,000 armed Nazis formed outside of the Bürgerbräukeller and marched into central Munich, the leaders just behind the flag bearers. They were blocked by a cordon of police, and firing broke out for less than a minute. Several of the Nazis in front were hit or dropped to the ground. Ludendorff and his adjutant Major Streck marched to the police line, where they pushed aside the rifle barrels. He was respectfully arrested. He was indignant when he was sent home while the other leaders remained in custody. Four police officers and 15 Nazis had been killed, including Ludendorff's servant, Kurt Neubauer.

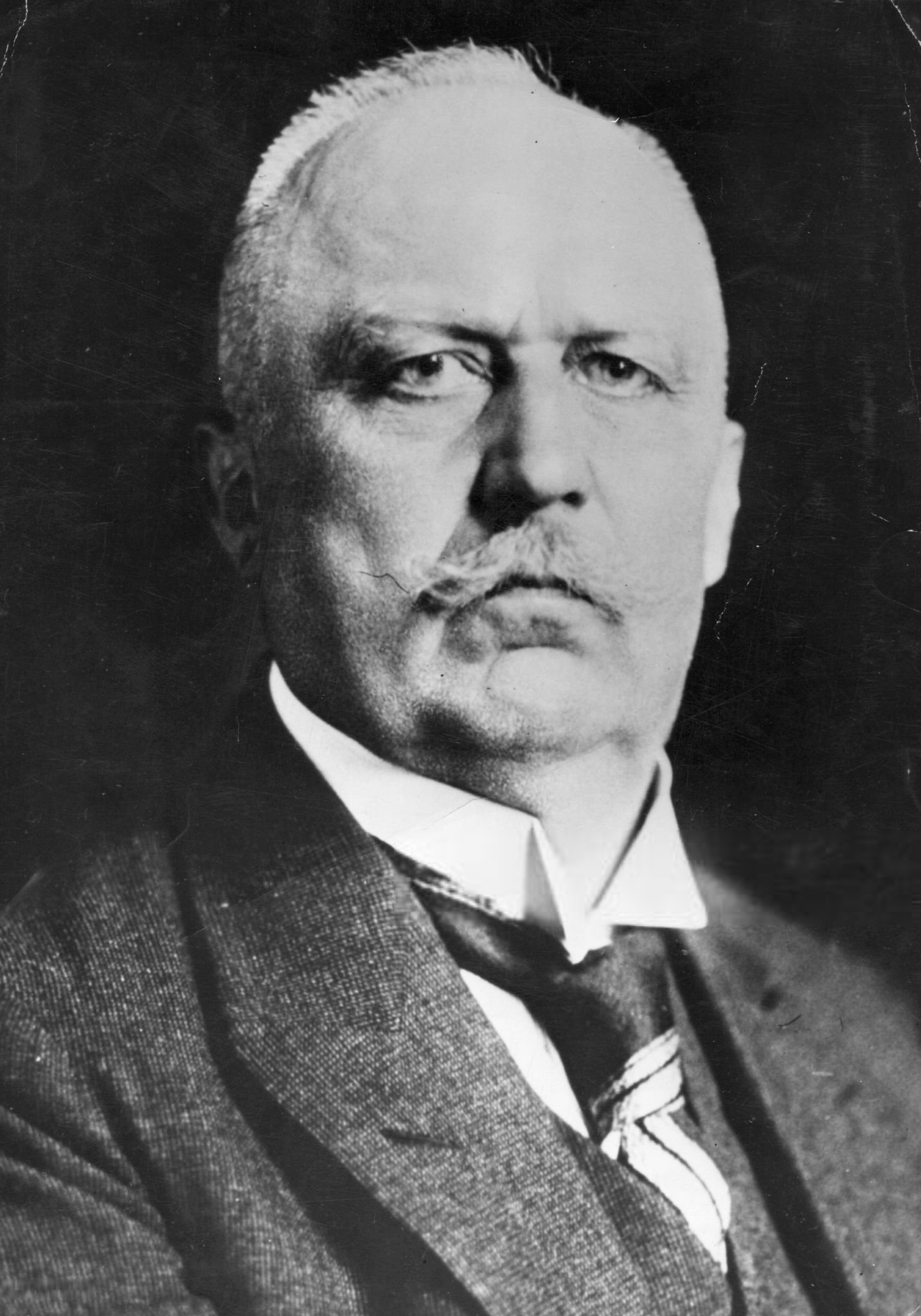
Ludendorff's official Reichstag portrait, 1924

They were tried in early 1924. Ludendorff was acquitted, but Heinz Pernet, Ludendorff's stepson, was convicted of "aiding and abetting treason," given a fifteen-month sentence. Hitler went to prison but was released after nine months. Ludendorff's 60th birthday was celebrated by massed bands and a large torchlight parade. In 1924, he was elected to the Reichstag as a representative of the NSFB (a coalition of the German Völkisch Freedom Party (DVFP) and members of the Nazi Party), serving until 1928. In 1925, he founded the Tannenbergbund, a German nationalist organization which was both anti-Semitic and anti-Catholic, and published literature espousing conspiracy theories involving Jews, Catholics — especially Jesuits — and Freemasons.

As his views became more extreme under the influence of his wife, Mathilde von Kemnitz, Ludendorff gradually began to part company with Hitler, who was surreptitiously working to undermine the reputation of his one serious rival for the leadership of the extreme right in Germany. The strained relationships between NSDAP and other far right or nationalist movements only increased the gap between Hitler and Ludendorff's ideas; the surge of the SA as the armed wing of National Socialism also made redundant the presence inside the party of a "military" leader (Ludendorff) interacting with the "political" leader (Hitler). By February 1926, Hitler's movement was in the process of breaking ties with Ludendorff-sponsored Tannenbergbund. Previously, Ludendorff had been persuaded to run for President of the Republic in the March 1925 election as the DVFP candidate, in alliance with the Nazis, but received only 1.1% of the vote; there is some evidence that Hitler himself persuaded Ludendorff to run, knowing that the results would be humiliating.

No one had a majority in the initial round of the election, so a second round was needed; Hindenburg entered the race and was narrowly elected. Ludendorff felt so humiliated by what he saw as a betrayal by his old friend that he broke off relations with Hindenburg and, in 1927, refused to even stand beside the field marshal at the dedication of the Tannenberg memorial. He attacked Hindenburg abusively for not having acted in a "nationalistic soldier-like fashion". The Berlin-based liberal newspaper Vossische Zeitung states in its article "Ludendorff's hate tirades against Hindenburg—Poisonous gas from Hitler's camp" that Ludendorff was, as of 29 March 1930, deeply grounded in Nazi ideology.

Tipton notes that Ludendorff was a social Darwinist who believed that war was the "foundation of human society", and that military dictatorship was the normal form of government in a society in which every resource must be mobilised. The historian Margaret L. Anderson notes that after the war, Ludendorff wanted Germany to go to war against all of Europe, and that he became a pagan worshipper of the Nordic god Wotan (Odin); he detested not only Judaism, but also Christianity, which he regarded as a weakening force.

== Retirement and death ==
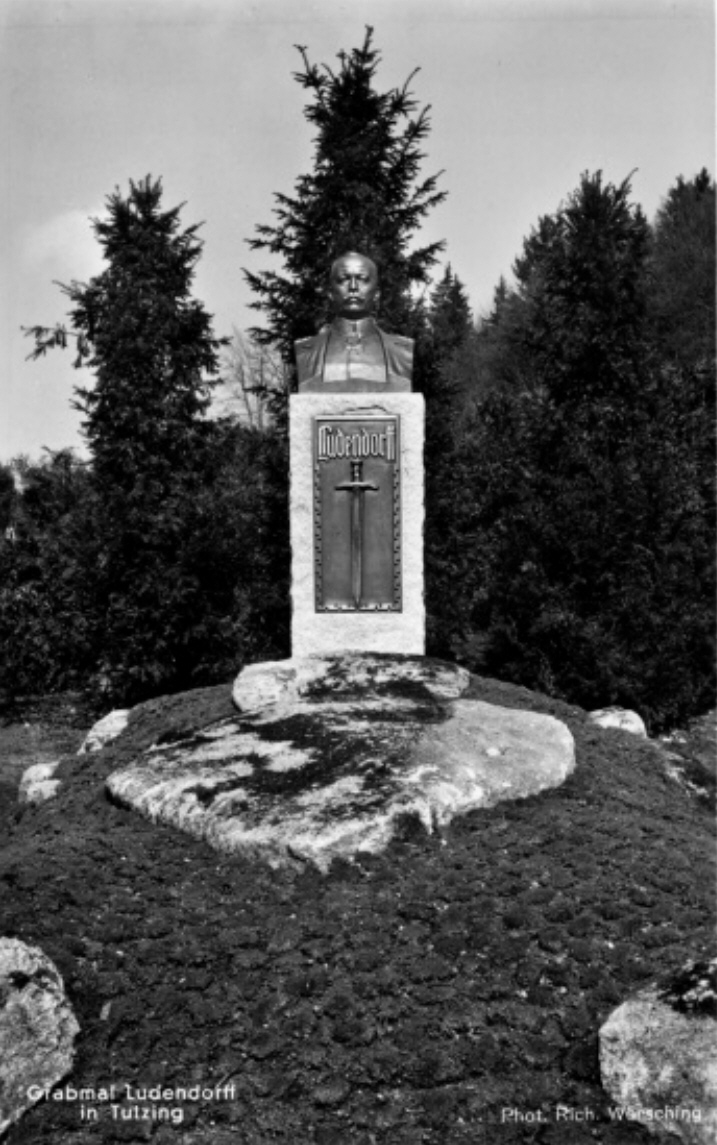
Ludendorff's grave

In 1926, Ludendorff divorced Margarethe Schmidt and married his second wife, Mathilde von Kemnitz (1877–1966). They published books and essays claiming that the world's problems were the result of Christianity, especially the Jesuits and Catholics, but also conspiracies by Jews and the Freemasons. In 1927 he published the book The Destruction of Free Masonry Through Revelation of Their Secrets. They founded the Bund für Gotteserkenntnis (in German) (Society for the Knowledge of God), a small and rather obscure esoterical society of theists.

By the time Hitler came to power, Ludendorff was no longer sympathetic to him. The Nazis distanced themselves from Ludendorff because of his eccentric conspiracy theories.

On 30 January 1933, the occasion of Hitler's appointment as Chancellor by President Hindenburg, Ludendorff allegedly sent the following telegram to Hindenburg:

I solemnly prophesy that this accursed man will cast our Reich into the abyss and bring our nation to inconceivable misery. Future generations will damn you in your grave for what you have done.

Some historians consider this text to be a forgery. In an attempt to regain Ludendorff's favor, Hitler arrived unannounced at Ludendorff's home on his 70th birthday in 1935 to promote him to field marshal. Infuriated, Ludendorff allegedly rebuffed Hitler by telling him: "An officer is named General Field-Marshal on the battlefield! Not at a birthday tea-party in the midst of peace." He wrote two further books on military themes.

Ludendorff died of liver cancer in the private clinic Josephinum in Munich, on 20 December 1937 at the age of 72. He was given — against his explicit wishes — a state funeral organised and attended by Hitler, who declined to speak at his eulogy. He was buried in the Neuer Friedhof in Tutzing in Bavaria.

== Decorations and awards ==
He received the following honours:

- Knight of the Military Order of Max Joseph (Bavaria);
- Grand Commander's Cross of the Royal House Order of Hohenzollern, with Star (Prussia);
- Pour le Mérite (military), 8 August 1914; with Oak Leaves, 23 February 1915 (Prussia);
- Grand Cross of the Iron Cross, 24 March 1918 (Prussia);
- Iron Cross (1914) 1st and 2nd Classes;
- Commander of the Order of the Zähringer Lion, 2nd Class (Baden);
- Knight of the Military Order of St. Henry (Saxony);
- Knight of the Military Merit Order (Württemberg);
- Knight Grand Cross of the House and Merit Order of Peter Frederick Louis, with Swords and Laurels (Oldenburg);
- Military Merit Cross, 2nd class (Mecklenburg-Schwerin);
- Military Merit Cross, 1st Class, with War Decoration (Austria-Hungary);
- Commander of the Imperial Austrian Order of Franz Joseph, with Star, 1913 (Austria-Hungary)
- Grand Cross of the Austrian Imperial Order of Leopold, 1917 (Austria-Hungary);
- Gold Military Merit Medal (Signum Laudis, Austria-Hungary);
- Cross for Merit in War (Saxe-Meiningen);
- Grand Cross of the Order of the Cross of Liberty, with Swords (Finland)

== Writings ==
=== Books (selection) ===
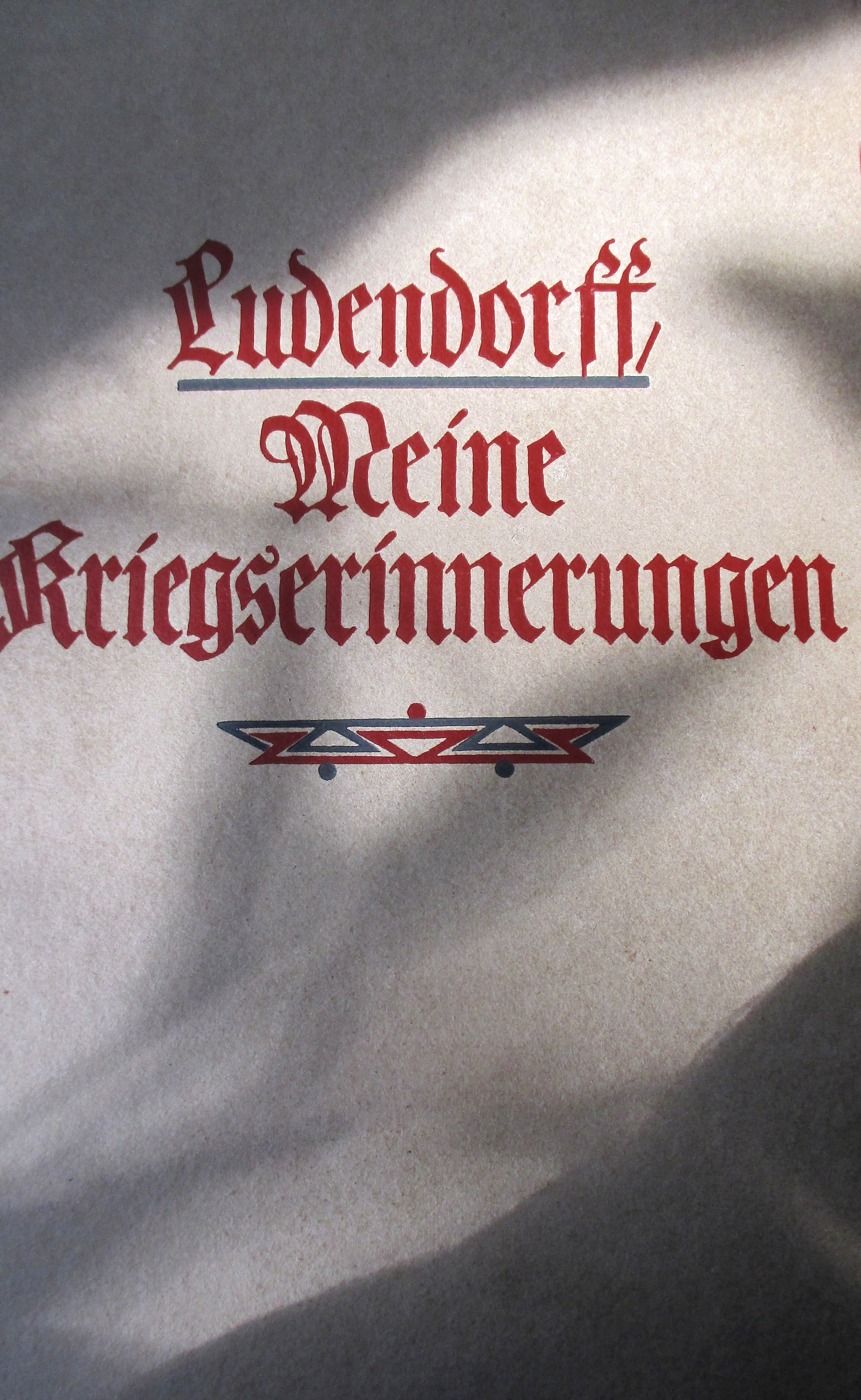
Erich Ludendorff – Meine Kriegserinnerungen – Ernst Mittler und Sohn – Berlin 1919

- 1919: Meine Kriegserinnerungen 1914–1918. Berlin: Mittler & Sohn (republished 1936)
  - translated into English by Frederic Appleby Holt as My War Memories 1914–1918, London: Hutchinson Heinemann, 1919 (vol. I, vol. II; American edition as Ludendorff's Own Story, Harper (publisher))
- 1920: (ed.) Urkunden der Obersten Heeresleitung über ihre Tätigkeit, 1916–1918, Berlin: E.S. Mittler & Sohn
  - translated into English by F.A. Holt as The General Staff and its Problems: The History of the Relations between the High Command and the German Imperial Government as Revealed by Official Documents, London: Hutchinson and Son, 1920 (vol. I, vol. II) (Note: The editors of the Revue historique considered it a "collection of texts published with an apologetic intention, but of capital interest".)
- 1933: Mein militärischer Werdegang. Blätter der Erinnerung an unser stolzes Heer. München: Ludendorffs Verlag
- 1937: mit Mitarbeitern: Mathilde Ludendorff – ihr Werk und Wirken. München: Ludendorffs Verlag
- 1937: Auf dem Weg zur Feldherrnhalle. Lebenserinnerungen an die Zeit des 9. November 1923. München: Ludendorffs Verlag
- 1939: with Mathilde Ludendorff: Die Judenmacht, ihr Wesen und Ende. München: Ludendorffs Verlag

=== Smaller publications ===
- 1926: Die Revolution von oben. Das Kriegsende und die Vorgänge beim Waffenstillstand. Zwei Vorträge. Lorch: Karl Rohm
- 1932: Schändliche Geheimnisse der Hochgrade. Ludendorffs Verlag, München
- 1934: Wie der Weltkrieg 1914 „gemacht“ wurde. München: Völkischer Verlag
- 1934: Das Marne-Drama. Der Fall Moltke-Hentsch. München: Ludendorffs Verlag
- 1934: "Tannenberg". Zum 20. Jahrestag der Schlacht. München: Ludendorffs Verlag
- 1934: Die politischen Hintergründe des 9. November 1923. München: Ludendorffs Verlag
- 1935: Über Unbotmäßigkeit im Kriege. München: Ludendorffs Verlag
- 1935: Französische Fälschung meiner Denkschrift von 1912 über den drohenden Krieg. München: Ludendorffs Verlag
- 1938–1940: Feldherrnworte. München: Ludendorffs Verlag
- 1939: Tannenberg. Geschichtliche Wahrheit über die Schlacht. München: Ludendorffs Verlag

=== As publisher ===
- 1929–1933 (banned): Ludendorffs Volkswarte ("Ludendorff's Peoples' Viewpoint"; weekly) Munich

== See also ==
- Dioscuri (World War I)

== Bibliography ==
=== Primary sources ===
- Ludendorff, Erich (1971) [1920]. Ludendorff's Own Story: August 1914 – November 1918; the Great War from the siege of Liège to the signing of the armistice as viewed from the grand headquarters of the German Army. Freeport, NY: Books for Libraries Press. ISBN 0-8369-5956-6.
- Ludendorff, Erich. The Coming War. Faber and Faber, 1931. (Weltkrieg droht auf deutschem Boden)
- Ludendorff, Erich. The Nation at War. Hutchinson, London, 1936. (Der totale Krieg)

=== Secondary sources ===
- Asprey, Robert B (1991). The German High Command at War: Hindenburg and Ludendorff and the First World War. New York: W. Morrow. ISBN 0-688-08226-2.
- Astore, William J. "The Tragic Pursuit of Total Victory." MHQ: Quarterly Journal of Military History (Autumn 2007) 20#1) pp. 64–73.
- Brownell, William and Denise Drace-Brownell. The First Nazi: Erich Ludendorff, The Man Who Made Hitler Possible (Berkeley: Counterpoint, 2016). 356 pp. highly negative online review
- Goodspeed, Donald J. (1966). Ludendorff: Genius of World War I. Boston, MA: Houghton Mifflin.
- Jones, LTC William A. Ludendorff: Strategist (Pickle Partners Publishing, 2015) online.
- Lee, John (2005). The Warlords: Hindenburg and Ludendorff. London: Orion Publishing Group. ISBN 0-297-84675-2.
- Livesay, John Frederick Bligh (1919). Canada's Hundred Days: With the Canadian Corps from Amiens to Mons, 8 August – 11 November 1918. Toronto: Thomas Allen.
- Parkinson, Roger (1978). Tormented Warrior. Ludendorff and the supreme command. London: Hodder & Stoughton. ISBN 0-340-21482-1.
- Showalter, Dennis, and William J. Astore. Hindenburg: Icon of German Militarism (2005) excerpt
- Amm, Bettina: Ludendorff-Bewegung. In: Wolfgang Benz (Hrsg.): Handbuch des Antisemitismus. Judenfeindlichkeit in Geschichte und Gegenwart, Band 5: Organisationen, Institutionen, Bewegungen. De Gruyter, Berlin 2012. p. 393 ff. ISBN 978-3-598-24078-2.
- Gruchmann, Lothar: Ludendorffs „prophetischer“ Brief an Hindenburg vom Januar/Februar 1933. Eine Legende. In: Vierteljahrshefte für Zeitgeschichte. Band 47, 1999. pp. 559–562.
- Nebelin, Manfred: Ludendorff. Diktator im Ersten Weltkrieg. Siedler, München 2011. ISBN 978-3-88680-965-3.
- Pöhlmann, Markus: Der moderne Alexander im Maschinenkrieg. In: Stig Förster (Hrsg.): Kriegsherren der Weltgeschichte. 22 historische Porträts. Beck, München 2006. ISBN 3-406-54983-7 pp. 268–286.
- Puschner, Uwe; Vollnhals, Clemens (Hrgb.); Die völkisch-religiöse Bewegung im Nationalsozialismus; Göttingen 2012 ISBN 978-3-525-36996-8.
- Schwab, Andreas: Vom totalen Krieg zur deutschen Gotterkenntnis. Die Weltanschauung Erich Ludendorffs. In: Schriftenreihe der Eidgenössischen Militärbibliothek und des Historischen Dienstes. Nr. 17, Bern 2005.
- Thoss, Bruno (1987). "Ludendorff, Erich". Neue Deutsche Biographie (in German). Vol. 15. Berlin: Duncker & Humblot. pp. 285–290. (full text online).
- Wegehaupt, Phillip: "Ludendorff, Erich". In: Wolfgang Benz (Hrsg.): Handbuch des Antisemitismus. Bd. 2: Personen. De Gruyter Saur, Berlin 2009, ISBN 978-3-598-44159-2, p. 494 ff. (retrieved über Verlag Walter de Gruyter Online).

Military offices
Preceded by Hugo von Freytag-Loringhoven	First Quartermaster-General of the German Army; 29 August 1916 – 26 October 1918	Succeeded by Wilhelm Groener
Awards and achievements
Preceded by Woodrow Wilson	Cover of Time magazine 19 November 1923	Succeeded by Hugh S. Gibson
