= Brzeźniki =

- Settlement
- Location within Poland
- Coordinates: 54°6′33″N 16°11′17″E
- Country: Poland
- Voivodeship: West Pomeranian
- County: Koszalin
- Gmina: Świeszyno
- Population: 12

Brzeźniki [bʐɛʑˈniki] (German: Birken) is a settlement in the administrative district of Gmina Świeszyno, within Koszalin County, West Pomeranian Voivodeship, in north-western Poland.It lies approximately 2 km (1 mi) south-east of Świeszyno, 9 km (6 mi) south of Koszalin, and 131 km (81 mi) north-east of the regional capital Szczecin. It has a population of 12.
