= Włoki =

- Village
- Location within Poland
- Coordinates: 54°6′57″N 16°11′41″E
- Country: Poland
- Voivodeship: West Pomeranian
- County: Koszalin
- Gmina: Świeszyno
- Population: 150

Włoki [ˈvwɔki] (German: Flakenfier) is a village in the administrative district of Gmina Świeszyno, within Koszalin County, West Pomeranian Voivodeship, in north-western Poland. It lies approximately 2 km (1 mi) south-east of Świeszyno, 8 km (5 mi) south of Koszalin, and 132 km (82 mi) north-east of the regional capital Szczecin.

For the history of the region, see History of Pomerania.

The village has a population of 150.
