= Golica, Poland =

Golica
- Village
- Location within Poland
- Coordinates: 54°5′22″N 16°7′38″E
- Country: Poland
- Voivodeship: West Pomeranian
- County: Koszalin
- Gmina: Świeszyno
- Population: 130

Golica [ɡɔˈlit͡sa] (German: Gülz) is a village in the administrative district of Gmina Świeszyno, within Koszalin County, West Pomeranian Voivodeship, in north-western Poland. It lies approximately 5 km (3 mi) south-west of Świeszyno, 12 km (7 mi) south of Koszalin, and 127 km (79 mi) north-east of the regional capital Szczecin.

For the history of the region, see History of Pomerania.

The village has a population of 130.
