= Mierzym =

- Village
- Location within Poland
- Coordinates: 54°7′42″N 16°12′45″E
- Country: Poland
- Voivodeship: West Pomeranian
- County: Koszalin
- Gmina: Świeszyno
- Population: 189

Mierzym [ˈmjɛʐɨm] is a village in the administrative district of Gmina Świeszyno, within Koszalin County, West Pomeranian Voivodeship, in north-western Poland. It lies approximately 3 km (2 mi) east of Świeszyno, 7 km (4 mi) south of Koszalin, and 134 km (83 mi) north-east of the regional capital Szczecin.

For the history of the region, see History of Pomerania.
