= Chałupy (disambiguation) =

Chałupy is a village and seaside resort in Pomeranian Voivodeship, Poland.

Chałupy may also refer to:

- Chałupy railway station, in the resort town
- Chałupy, West Pomeranian Voivodeship, a village in northwest Poland

== See also ==
- Trzy Chałupy (disambiguation)
