= Krokowo, West Pomeranian Voivodeship =

Krokowo
- Settlement
- Location within Poland
- Coordinates: 54°6′47″N 16°10′24″E
- Country: Poland
- Voivodeship: West Pomeranian
- County: Koszalin
- Gmina: Świeszyno
- Population: 30

Krokowo [krɔˈkɔvɔ] (German: Krück) is a settlement in the administrative district of Gmina Świeszyno, within Koszalin County, West Pomeranian Voivodeship, in north-western Poland. It lies approximately 2 km (1 mi) south of Świeszyno, 8 km (5 mi) south of Koszalin, and 131 km (81 mi) north-east of the regional capital Szczecin.

The settlement has a population of 30.
