= Czaple, West Pomeranian Voivodeship =

Czaple
- Village
- Location within Poland
- Coordinates: 54°1′33″N 16°14′43″E
- Country: Poland
- Voivodeship: West Pomeranian
- County: Koszalin
- Gmina: Świeszyno
- Population: 53

Czaple [ˈt͡ʂaplɛ] (German: Groß Zabelsberg) is a village in the administrative district of Gmina Świeszyno, within Koszalin County, West Pomeranian Voivodeship, in north-western Poland. It lies approximately 12 km (7 mi) south-east of Świeszyno, 18 km (11 mi) south of Koszalin, and 129 km (80 mi) north-east of the regional capital Szczecin.

For the history of the region, see History of Pomerania.

The village has a population of 53.
