= Czersk Koszaliński =

- Settlement
- Location within Poland
- Coordinates: 54°8′11″N 16°8′34″E
- Country: Poland
- Voivodeship: West Pomeranian
- County: Koszalin
- Gmina: Świeszyno
- Population: 3

Czersk Koszaliński (Polish pronunciation: [ˈt͡ʂɛrsk kɔʂaˈlij̃skʲi]) is a settlement in the administrative district of Gmina Świeszyno, within Koszalin County, West Pomeranian Voivodeship, in north-western Poland. It lies approximately 3 km (2 mi) north-west of Świeszyno, 6 km (4 mi) south-west of Koszalin, and 130 km (81 mi) north-east of the regional capital Szczecin.

For the history of the region, see History of Pomerania.

The settlement has a population of 3.
