= Zegrzyn =

- Village
- Location within Poland
- Coordinates: 54°4′1″N 16°13′24″E
- Country: Poland
- Voivodeship: West Pomeranian
- County: Koszalin
- Gmina: Świeszyno

Zegrzyn [ˈzɛɡʐɨn] (German: Seegerhütte) is a village in the administrative district of Gmina Świeszyno, within Koszalin County, West Pomeranian Voivodeship, in north-western Poland. It lies approximately 8 km (5 mi) south-east of Świeszyno, 14 km (9 mi) south of Koszalin, and 130 km (81 mi) north-east of the regional capital Szczecin.

For the history of the region, see History of Pomerania.
