= Bardzlino =

- Village
- Location within Poland
- Coordinates: 54°4′32″N 16°7′17″E
- Country: Poland
- Voivodeship: West Pomeranian
- County: Koszalin
- Gmina: Świeszyno
- Population: 147

Bardzlino [bard͡zˈlinɔ] (German: Barzlin) is a village in the administrative district of Gmina Świeszyno, within Koszalin County, West Pomeranian Voivodeship, in north-western Poland.It lies approximately 7 km (4 mi) south-west of Świeszyno, 13 km (8 mi) south of Koszalin, and 125 km (78 mi) north-east of the regional capital Szczecin.

The village has a population of 147.
