= Olszak, West Pomeranian Voivodeship =

Olszak
- Settlement
- Location within Poland
- Coordinates: 54°6′34″N 16°12′4″E
- Country: Poland
- Voivodeship: West Pomeranian
- County: Koszalin
- Gmina: Świeszyno
- Population: 26

Olszak [ˈɔlʂak] (German: Dreikathen) is a settlement in the administrative district of Gmina Świeszyno, within Koszalin County, West Pomeranian Voivodeship, in north-western Poland. It lies approximately 3 km (2 mi) south-east of Świeszyno, 9 km (6 mi) south of Koszalin, and 132 km (82 mi) north-east of the regional capital Szczecin.

For the history of the region, see History of Pomerania.

The settlement has a population of 26.
