= Hans Ludendorff =

German astronomer and astrophysicist (1873 – 1941)

Friedrich Wilhelm Hans Ludendorff (Dunowo, 26 May 1873 – Potsdam, 26 June 1941) was a German astronomer and astrophysicist. He was the younger brother of General Erich Ludendorff.

After studying physics, mathematics and astronomy in Berlin, he started to work as assistant at the Hamburg observatory in 1897. The following year he changed to the Astrophysical Observatory of Potsdam, where became observator (1905) and chief observator (1915). From 1921 until his retirement in 1938 he was director of the observatory. Between 1920 and 1930 he belonged to the board of the Astronomical Society.

He authored several astronomical and astrophysical works (the first was about asteroids, following his graduation in 1896), but is better known for the Ludendorff Catalogue, that lists the most important stars in the globular cluster Messier 13, published in 1905.

In 1908 he established the binary character of the star Mizar B (period: 175.6 days), together with American astronomer Edwin Brant Frost.

He also authored several studies on the astronomy of Pre-Columbian civilizations, especially that of the Mayas.

== Articles ==
- Tafel zur Berechnung der Störungsfunction für die äussersten kleinen Planeten, (1896), Astronomische Nachrichten, volume 140, p. 197.
- Der grosse Sternhaufen im Herkules Messier 13, (1905), Publikationen des Astrophysikalischen Observatoriums zu Potsdam; 15. Bd, Nr. 50.
- Notiz über den spektroskopischen Doppelstern gamma Geminorum (1912), Astronomische Nachrichten, volume 192, p. 447.
- Weitere Untersuchungen über die Massen der spektroskopischen Doppelsterne, (1920), Astronomische Nachrichten, volume 211, p. 105.
- Handbuch der Astrophysik (1928).
- Zur Deutung des Dresdener Maya Kodex, Sitzungsberichten der Preussischen Ahademie der Wissenschaften, núm. 11, Berlín, 1937.
- Versammlung der Astronomischen Gesellschaft, (1939), Astronomische Nachrichten, volume 268, p. 163.
- Die Astronomischen Inschriften der Maya, (1940), Festschrift für Elis Strömgren. Astronomical Papers. Copenhagen: Einar Munksgaard, 1940., p. 143.

== Sources ==
- Smithsonian/NASA Astrophysics Data System (ADS): 84 of his published articles (in German or English).
