= Konikowo, West Pomeranian Voivodeship =

Konikowo
- Village
- Location within Poland
- Coordinates: 54°9′4″N 16°10′43″E
- Country: Poland
- Voivodeship: West Pomeranian
- County: Koszalin
- Gmina: Świeszyno
- Population: 626

Konikowo [kɔniˈkɔvɔ] (German Konikow) is a village in the administrative district of Gmina Świeszyno, within Koszalin County, West Pomeranian Voivodeship, in north-western Poland. It lies approximately 4 km (2 mi) north of Świeszyno, 4 km (2 mi) south of Koszalin, and 133 km (83 mi) north-east of the regional capital Szczecin.

The village has a population of 626.
