= 31st Air Base =

Polish Air Force base and military airport

Coordinates: 52.33041°N 16.96563°E

- 31. Baza Lotnicza
- Near Nowe Miasto, Poznań in Poland
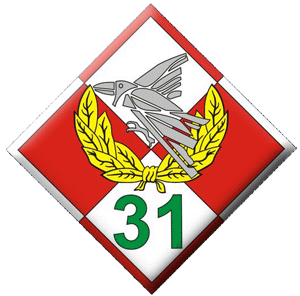

Site information
- Owner: Ministry of Defence
- Operator: Polish Air Force

Site history
- Built: 1941
- In use: 1954–present

Garrison information
- Garrison: 3rd Tactical Squadron

Poznań-Krzesiny Airport
- IATA: none; ICAO: EPKS

Summary
- Airport type: military
- Serves: Poznań
- Focus city for: Poznań
- Built: 1941
- Elevation AMSL: 276 ft (84 m)
- Interactive map of Poznań-Krzesiny Airport

Runways
Direction	Length		Surface
Direction	ft	m	Surface
11/29	8,202	2,500	Concrete

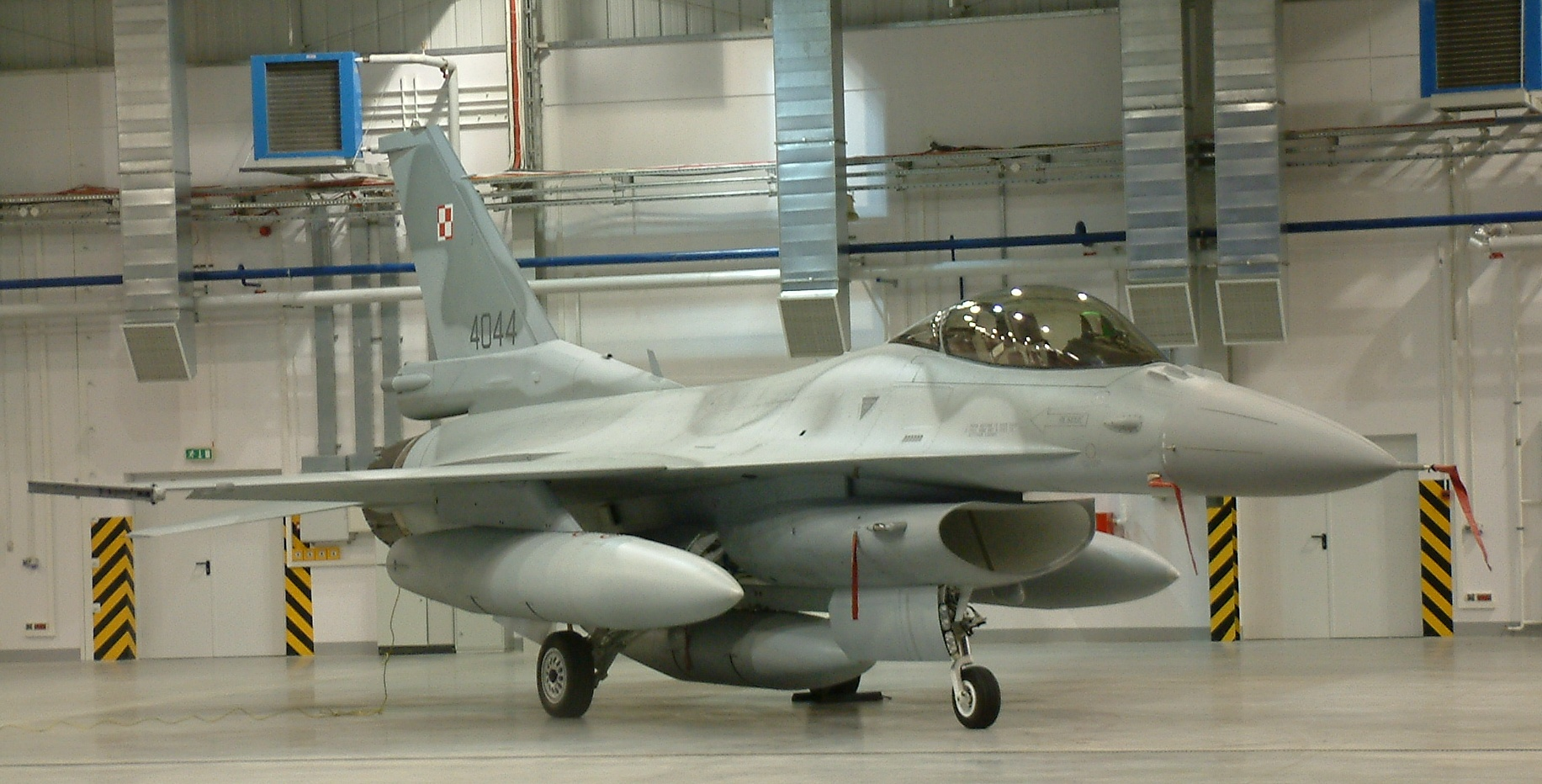
One of the first Polish F-16s to arrive at Krzesiny, photo taken on November 11, 2006

The 31st Air Base (Polish: 31. Baza Lotnicza), commonly known as Poznań-Krzesiny Airport is a Polish Air Force base and military airport, located in Krzesiny, part of the Nowe Miasto district of Poznań.

The base was officially constituted on 31 December 2000, and since then has been the home base for the 3rd Tactical Squadron. It was the first base to host Polish F-16 fighters.

== History ==
In 1941, during its occupation of Poznań, Nazi Germany built an aircraft factory at Krzesiny (German: Luftwaffenfliegerhorst Kreising), along with an airfield to service it. The factory, run by Focke-Wulf, was a target for Allied bombers in the course of the war, on 29 May 1944 for Eighth Air Force. On 22 January 1945 the airfield was captured by Red Army and taken over by the Red Army Air Force. In mid-1945 the 113th Bomber Aviation Division of the 6th Bomber Aviation Corps of the 16th Air Army was reported here. In 1954 the Soviets transferred the base to the Communist Polish People's Army. Since then the base has hosted various units under changing designations:

- since 1954: one of squadrons of 11th Fighter Regiment (11. Pułk Lotnictwa Myśliwskiego) that was in this same year transformed to 62nd School-Training Fighter Regiment (62. Pułk Szkolno-Treningowy Lotnictwa Myśliwskiego) which was part of the 3rd Air Defence Corps (Poland).
- in 1957 the regiment was renamed to the 62nd Fighter Regiment (62. Pułk Lotnictwa Myśliwskiego) which, in 1958, received name of "Insurgents of Greater Poland Uprising (1918–1919)" (Powstańców Wielkopolskich 1918/1919)
- on 16 January 1994 regiment was renamed to 3rd Fighter Regiment of Poznań (3. Pułk Lotnictwa Myśliwskiego "Poznań") that consists two squadrons
- in 1999 1st squadron was enlarged by part of personnel and aircraft of disbanded 17th Air Force Squadron (17. Eskadra Lotnicza) from Poznań-Ławica Airport

The organisation as an air base was implemented on 31 December 2000 to conform with NATO practices, separating the air base from the units which are based there. On this date 3rd Fighter Regiment was split into 31st Air Base (31. Baza Lotnicza) and 3rd Tactical Squadron (3. Eskadra Lotnictwa Taktycznego).

On 1 April 2008 31st Air Base was again joined with 3rd Tactical Squadron and 6th Tactical Squadron to form single unit named 31st Tactical Air Base.

== Confusion with Poznań–Ławica Airport ==
Poznań–Krzesiny Airport has been confused by pilots with Poznań–Ławica Airport, which also has a 2,500 m (8,200 ft) runway. The runways are at approximately the same orientation: Ławica's is 11/29 (true heading: 108/288) and Krzesiny's is 12/30 (true heading: 117.9/297.9). The two runways lie in a nearly straight line, with Krzesiny coming up first on approaches from the east, the ones used most often. On the other hand, the Krzesiny airbase lies southeast from the city centre, while Poznań–Ławica lies just west of it. Krzesiny had a second runway, but at an unknown date this second runway that crosses runway 12/30 was closed, as in satellite images it is marked with large white X marks.

One notable incident involving confusion between Ławica and Krzesiny happened on August 15, 2006. A Sky Airlines Boeing 737-800 operating flight SKY335 mistook the runway at Krzesiny for the one being used at Ławica. The crew didn't realise their error until later, when they took off to reposition the jet to the main airport.

According to Krzysztof Krawcewicz, a pilot and the editor-in-chief of the Polish monthly Przegląd Lotniczy/Aviation Revue, this was at least the seventh aircraft that mistakenly landed at Poznań–Krzesiny in 2006 alone. He blamed, amongst other things, the "scandalous procedures which are in use by the air traffic control at Poznań–Ławica" and the lack of radar use in controlling aircraft landing, which exists, but had been turned off by the Polish Air Traffic Agency (Agencja Ruchu Lotniczego).
