= Czacz, West Pomeranian Voivodeship =

Czacz
- Settlement
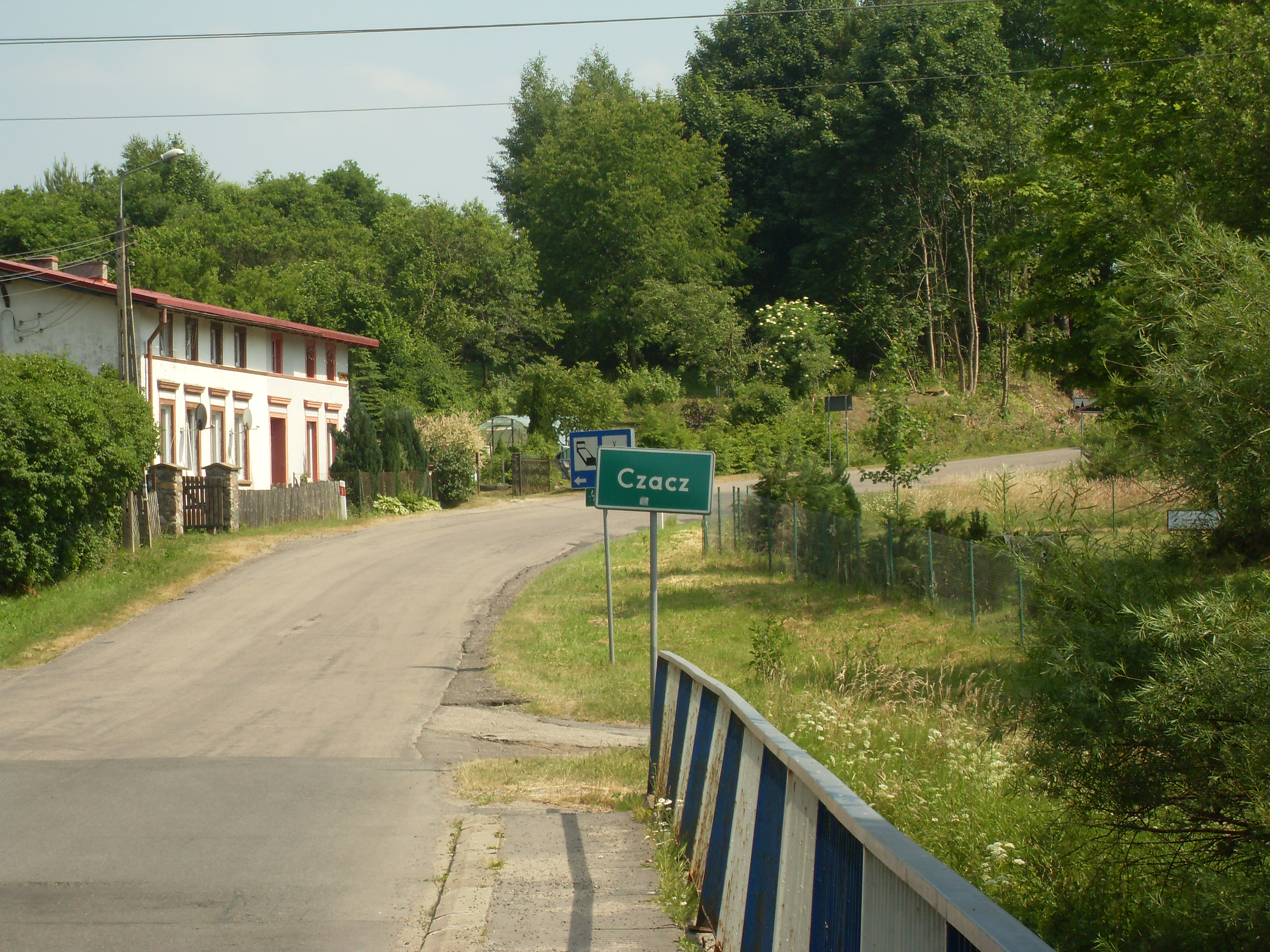
- Road sign in Czacz

- Location within Poland
- Coordinates: 54°03′44″N 16°10′10″E
- Country: Poland
- Voivodeship: West Pomeranian
- County: Koszalin
- Gmina: Świeszyno

Czacz [t͡ʂat͡ʂ] is a settlement in the administrative district of Gmina Świeszyno, within Koszalin County, West Pomeranian Voivodeship, in north-western Poland.

For the history of the region, see History of Pomerania.
