= Gmina Świeszyno =

Gmina Świeszyno Świeszyno Commune
- Gmina
- Flag Coat of arms
- Interactive map of Gmina Świeszyno
- Coordinates (Świeszyno): 54°7′20″N 16°10′9″E
- Country: Poland
- Voivodeship: West Pomeranian
- County: Koszalin County
- Seat: Świeszyno

Area
  - Total: 132.59 km^{2} (51.19 sq mi)

Population (2006)
  - Total: 5,621
  - Density: 42.39/km^{2} (109.8/sq mi)
- Website: http://www.swieszyno.pl/

Gmina Świeszyno is a rural gmina (administrative district) in Koszalin County, West Pomeranian Voivodeship, in north-western Poland. Its seat is the village of Świeszyno, which lies approximately 7 kilometres (4 mi) south of Koszalin and 131 km (81 mi) north-east of the regional capital Szczecin.

The gmina covers an area of 132.59 square kilometres (51.2 sq mi), and as of 2006 its total population is 5,621.

== Villages ==
Gmina Świeszyno contains the villages and settlements of Bagno, Bardzlino, Biała Kępa, Brzeźniki, Chałupy, Chłopska Kępa, Czacz, Czaple, Czersk Koszaliński, Dunowo, Giezkowo, Golica, Jarzyce, Kępa Świeszyńska, Kłokęcin, Konikowo, Krokowo, Kurozwęcz, Mierzym, Niedalino, Niekłonice, Olszak, Sieranie, Strzekęcino, Świeszyno, Węgorki, Wiązogóra, Włoki, Zegrze Pomorskie and Zegrzyn.

== Neighbouring gminas ==
Gmina Świeszyno is bordered by the city of Koszalin and by the gminas of Białogard, Biesiekierz, Bobolice, Manowo and Tychowo.
