= Chałupy, West Pomeranian Voivodeship =

Chałupy
- Village
- Location within Poland
- Coordinates: 54°8′3″N 16°11′17″E
- Country: Poland
- Voivodeship: West Pomeranian
- County: Koszalin
- Gmina: Świeszyno
- Population: 144

Chałupy [xaˈwupɨ] (German: Kossätheberg) is a village in the administrative district of Gmina Świeszyno, within Koszalin County, West Pomeranian Voivodeship, in north-western Poland. It lies approximately 2 km (1 mi) north-east of Świeszyno, 6 km (4 mi) south of Koszalin, and 133 km (83 mi) north-east of the regional capital Szczecin.

The village has a population of 144.
