= 3rd Tactical Squadron =

3rd Tactical Squadron "Poznan"
- 3.ELT coat of arms
- Active: 1954 - 2008
- Disbanded: 2008
- Country: Poland
- Allegiance: Polish Air Force
- Type: Tactical Squadron
- Role: Attack, Training
- Base: 31st Air Base
- Mascot: Black Raven

Commanders
- Squadron Leader: Col. Waldemar Gołębiowski

Aircraft flown
- Fighter: F-16 C, F-16D
- Utility helicopter: Mi-2

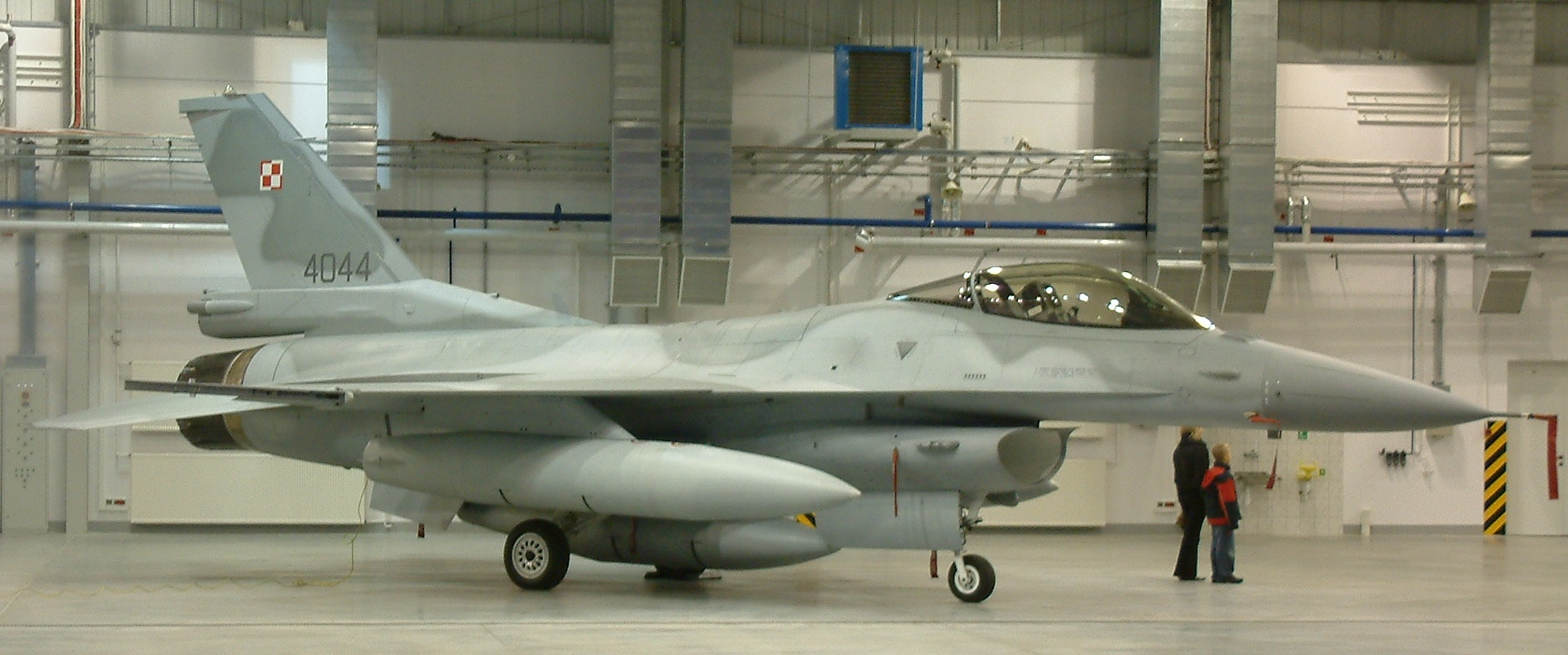
F-16 in hangar

The 3rd Tactical Squadron (known as 3.ELT - 3 Eskadra Lotnictwa Taktycznego in Poland) was a fighter squadron of the Polish Air Force established in 2001 in Poznań, Poland. The squadron was stationed in the 31st Air Base and had acquired F-16 C/D Block 52+ Adv. fighters. From 1954 to 2001 the unit was known as "3. Pułk Lotnictwa Myśliwskiego". In 2008 the unit was fused with the 6th Tactical Squadron and the 31st Air Base. Those three units were transformed into the 31st Tactical Air Base unit.

The unit inherited the traditions of the 62nd Fighter Aviation Regiment of the National Air Defence, which had been stationed in Krzesiny, Poznań, before being dissolved and merged with the 6th Tactical Squadron, to form the 31st Tactical Air Base

== Equipment ==
=== Current ===
- Fighters:
  - F-16 C Block 52+ Multirole fighters
  - F-16 D Block 52+ Multirole fighters
- Utility:
  - Antonov An-2 Utility aircraft
  - Mil Mi-2 Utility helicopter

=== Retired ===
- Fighters:
  - MiG-15 Jet fighters (1954–1958)
  - MiG-17 Jet fighters (1958–1981)
  - MiG-19 Jet fighters (1959–1963)
  - MiG-21 Jet fighters (1963–2003)

== Squadron Commanders ==
- mjr. pilot Wojciech Krupa (January 1, 2001 - October 28, 2002)
- mjr. pilot Rościsław Stepaniuk (October 28, 2002 - February 9, 2004)
- col. pilot Zbigniew Zawada (February 9, 2004 - October 13, 2004)
- mjr. pilot Adam Bondaruk (October 13, 2004 - February 25, 2005)
- col. navigator mgr Mariusz Glazer (February 25, 2005 - April 7, 2005)
- mjr. pilot mgr Krzysztof Siarkiewicz (April 7, 2005 - October 24, 2005)
- col. pilot Waldemar Gołębiowski ( current commander from October 24, 2005)
