= Trzy Chałupy =

Trzy Chałupy ("three cottages") may refer to the following villages in Poland:

- Trzy Chałupy, Oleśnica County
- Trzy Chałupy, Trzebnica County

== See also ==
- Chałupy (disambiguation)
