= Kruszewnia =

- Village
- Location within Poland
- Coordinates: 52°22′32″N 17°6′4″E
- Country: Poland
- Voivodeship: Greater Poland
- County: Poznań
- Gmina: Swarzędz
- Population: 151

Kruszewnia [kruˈʂɛvɲa] is a village in the administrative district of Gmina Swarzędz, within Poznań County, Greater Poland Voivodeship, in west-central Poland.

The village is the birthplace of the German general Erich Ludendorff and bore his name from 1939 to 1945.

== Notable residents ==
- Erich Ludendorff (1865–1937), German general
