= Zegrze Pomorskie =

- Village
- Location within Poland
- Coordinates: 54°2′52″N 16°13′21″E
- Country: Poland
- Voivodeship: West Pomeranian
- County: Koszalin
- Gmina: Świeszyno
- Population: 430

Zegrze Pomorskie [ˈzɛɡʐɛ pɔˈmɔrskʲɛ] is a village in the administrative district of Gmina Świeszyno, within Koszalin County, West Pomeranian Voivodeship, in north-western Poland. It lies approximately 9 km (6 mi) south-east of Świeszyno, 16 km (10 mi) south of Koszalin, and 129 km (80 mi) north-east of the regional capital Szczecin.

For the history of the region, see History of Pomerania.
