= August Keim =

Prussian general

August Keim (1845–1926) was an officer in the German Army during the Wilhelmine era.

== Brief history ==
From the Hessian family line, known for its military prestige, August Keim was an avid military historian. Keim followed his bloodline by joining the army as a cadet in 1862 where his father and grandfather had previously attended. He was used in the historical division of the Hessian regiment where he was provided a chance to lecture at the Military Academy.

Keim battled in the wars of 1866 and 1870 as well as the Wars of Unification, referred to as the Austro-Prussian and Franco-Prussian Wars, before he proceeded to the General Staff in 1881. During the tail end of the 1880s Keim began to write for the press and ultimately criticized the German defense policy leading to his discharge to a lesser field position. He was later recalled in 1892 to lead the Army Bill of 1892-1893 campaign. Keim left the German Army in 1899 at the age of 54 by retiring.

== Keim's Approach on German Military Techniques and Mindset ==
As a charismatic German nationalist, Keim was very influential. Being part of the far right, he believed that the Kaiserheer, or the Imperial German Army, was in dire need of a redirection from where the army was before his involvement. According to him, German leadership was poor and their strategy was just as poorly thought out. According to his mindset, only a scholarly approach to this dilemma could help educate the German Army and increase its effectiveness.

By using an intellectual view, Keim lectured and criticized the German forces. By attempting to be more free-thinking, Keim reviewed the German commands and war strategies. After scrutinizing such subjects which were included in German warfare, Keim lectured of how poorly the German war machine operated. By using late Prussian tactics, Keim was able to create a new focus on war preparation, wartime decisions, and post war solutions to exemplify the German's progress as an army.

As the head of the German Populist Faction, Keim wished to take a more political view on educating the public. Believing this matter needed a more active push to understanding, Keim worked to help expand the German fleet as well as contribute the Army League by founding it in 1912.

== Keim's History With German Organizations ==
After Keim retired from the Kaiserheer, he wished to increase his position in Germany by becoming the president and head of a myriad of German organizations like the Navy League as to become more influential and in turn create a more powerful position for himself in the German society. Along with joining groups, Keim became a journalist. He focused on the undesirable state that the army was in and his views for a future reformation within the Kaiserheer.

By using Wilhelmine pressure groups which utilized press campaigns, leafleting and public meetings, Keim was able to assert his position on certain issues of the day. Joining an Anti-Feminist organization because he believed that Feminists were anti-national aided his position as well as his introduction of the Army Bill of 1893,which was intended to increase funds for the Kaiserheer. By using defense-minded propaganda groups like the Deutsche Flottenverein and Wehrverein to influence the German press to summon a military Weltpolitik, Keim lobbied the Kaiser to subtract money from the Navy and add to the Army, all in which the Kaiser did in time.

He joined the Pan-German League in 1908 and became the president, but later joined the German Army League in 1912 in order to become its leader and help aid Germany with its unification while strengthening its army so that it would be ready for any inevitable war. This non-partisan group was intended to increase the army's soldier number by fifty percent, but never achieved such a dramatic reformation. Near the advent of World War I, the group went into a depression because of the lack of money and never regained its full composure thereafter.

== See also ==
- Nationalism
- Wilhelmine Germany
- Erich Von Falkenhayn
