= 31st Tactical Air Base =

Coordinates: 52°19′49.09″N 16°57′55.37″E

31st Tactical Air Base Unit
- logo / coat of arms
- Active: 2008–present
- Country: Poland
- Allegiance: Polish Air Force
- Type: Tactical Air Force Unit
- Role: Providing Air Superiority, Reconnaissance
- Size: 2x Squadrons
- Location: Krzesiny, part of the Nowe Miasto district of Poznań

Commanders
- Commendatnt: Col. Cezary WIŚNIEWSKI

Insignia
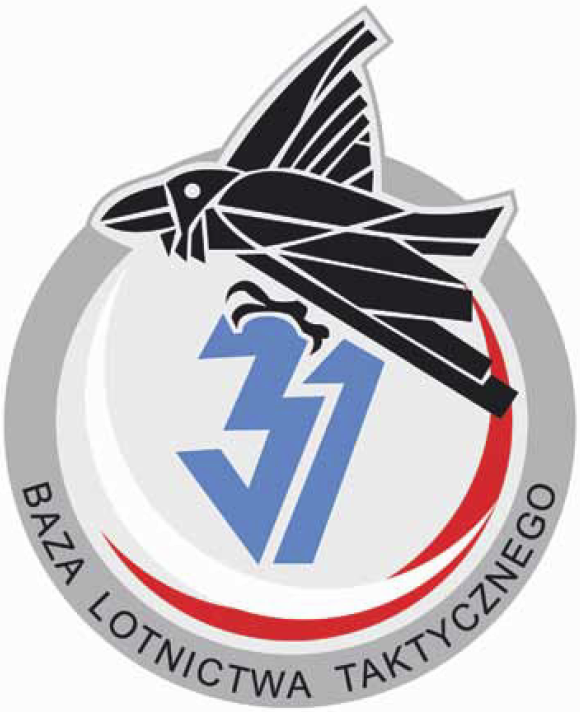
- Distinctive unit insignia

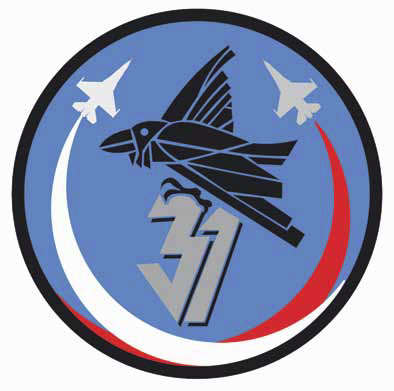
- Shoulder sleeve insignia (everyday uniform)

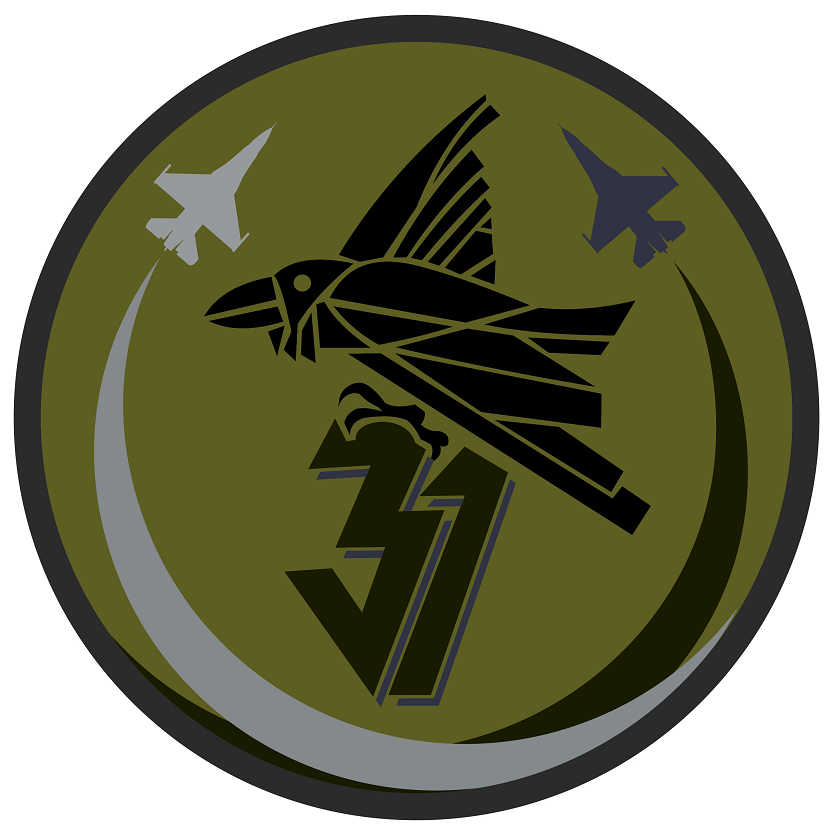
- Shoulder sleeve insignia (field uniform)

Aircraft flown
- Fighter: General Dynamics F-16 C/D +52
- Utility helicopter: Mil Mi-2

The 31st Tactical Air Base (Polish: 31 Baza Lotnictwa Taktycznego – 31 BLT) is the biggest military unit of the Polish Air Force. The unit was created in 2008 as a result of fusion of three previous units: 31st Air Base, 3rd Tactical Squadron and 6th Tactical Squadron. The unit operates two squadrons of F-16 C/D fighters (16 planes in each squadron). The associated base, Krzesiny air base outside of Poznan, currently operates F-16 fighters only.

Previously the 31st Air Base (Polish: 31. Baza Lotnicza) had been organised as a Polish Air Force base, located in Krzesiny, part of the Nowe Miasto district of Poznań. It is the first base to host the recently acquired F-16 fighters. The base was officially constituted on 31 December 2000.

== 3rd Tactical Squadron ==
The 3rd Tactical Squadron had previously been part of the 31st Air Base since 31 December 2000.

== 6th Tactical Squadron ==
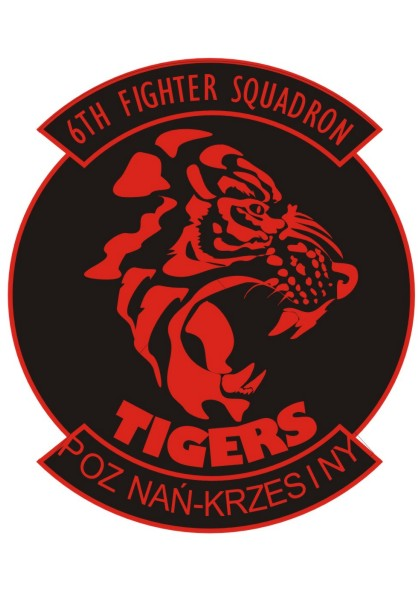
The logo of the 6th Tactical Squadron.

The 6th Tactical Squadron was previously known as the 6th Fighter-Bomber Aviation Regiment (6 Pułk Lotnictwa Myśliwsko-Bombowego) (1982–1998) and the 6th Tactical Air Squadron (6 Eskadra Lotnictwa Taktycznego) from 2000 to 2008.

== Air Base ==
The 31st Air Force Base is a logistics unit, providing comprehensive support for training and warfare of all air force units residing on the base area. It provides a wide range of support for air units deployed to the base for tasks during peacetime, in states of emergency, or in war situations. It also provides logistics support for other units permanently or temporarily deployed to the base, as well as search and rescue (SAR), combat search and rescue (CSAR) and combat air patrol (CAP) duties.

Main tasks of the air base include:

- coordinating and supporting incoming air elements of different services and countries
- logistics and securing of combat missions of military aircraft
- organization and maintenance of command system of military aircraft
- coordination and execution of loading procedures for other types of aircraft
- storage, preparation and supply of air combat supplies for air units stationing in air base
- the maintenance and servicing of air and ground equipment

== Equipment ==
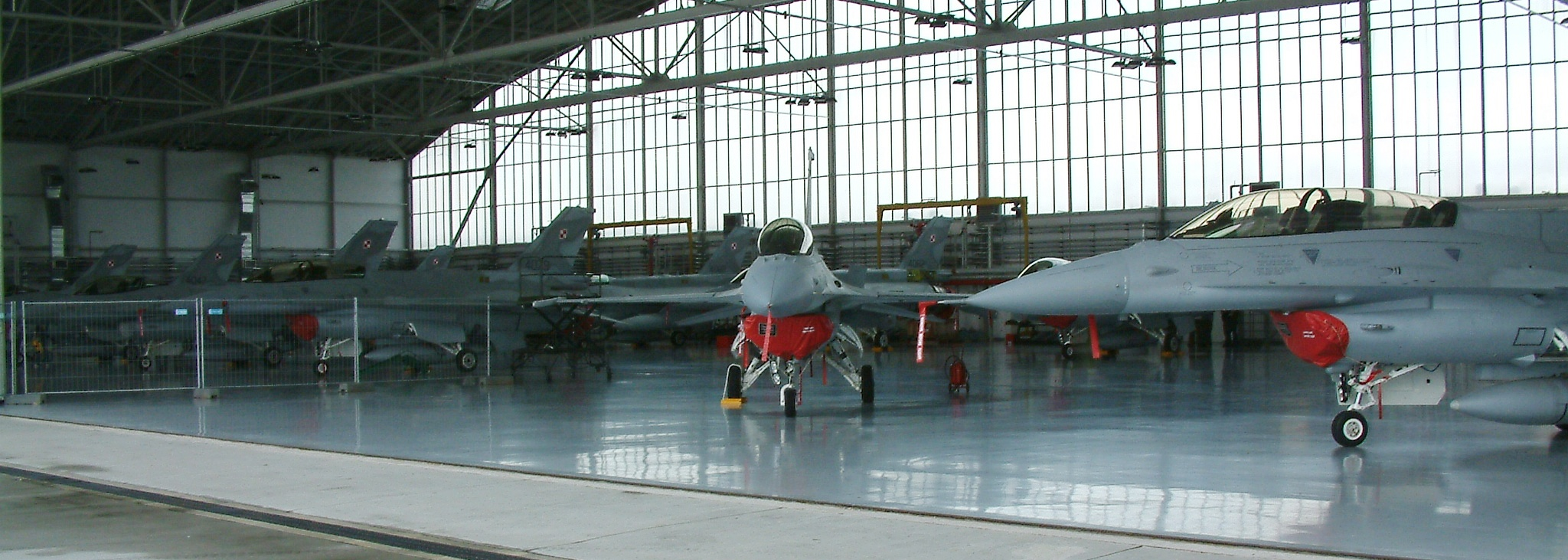
F-16 C/Ds in the base's hangar

| Aircraft | Origin | Type | In service |
|---|---|---|---|
| General Dynamics F-16C Block 52+ | (United States) USA | Multirole Jet Fighter | 23 |
| General Dynamics F-16D Block 52+ | (United States) USA | Multirole Jet Fighter | 9 |
| Mil Mi-2 | Poland; Soviet Union | Light Utility Helicopter | 2 |
