= Świeszyno, West Pomeranian Voivodeship =

Świeszyno
- Village
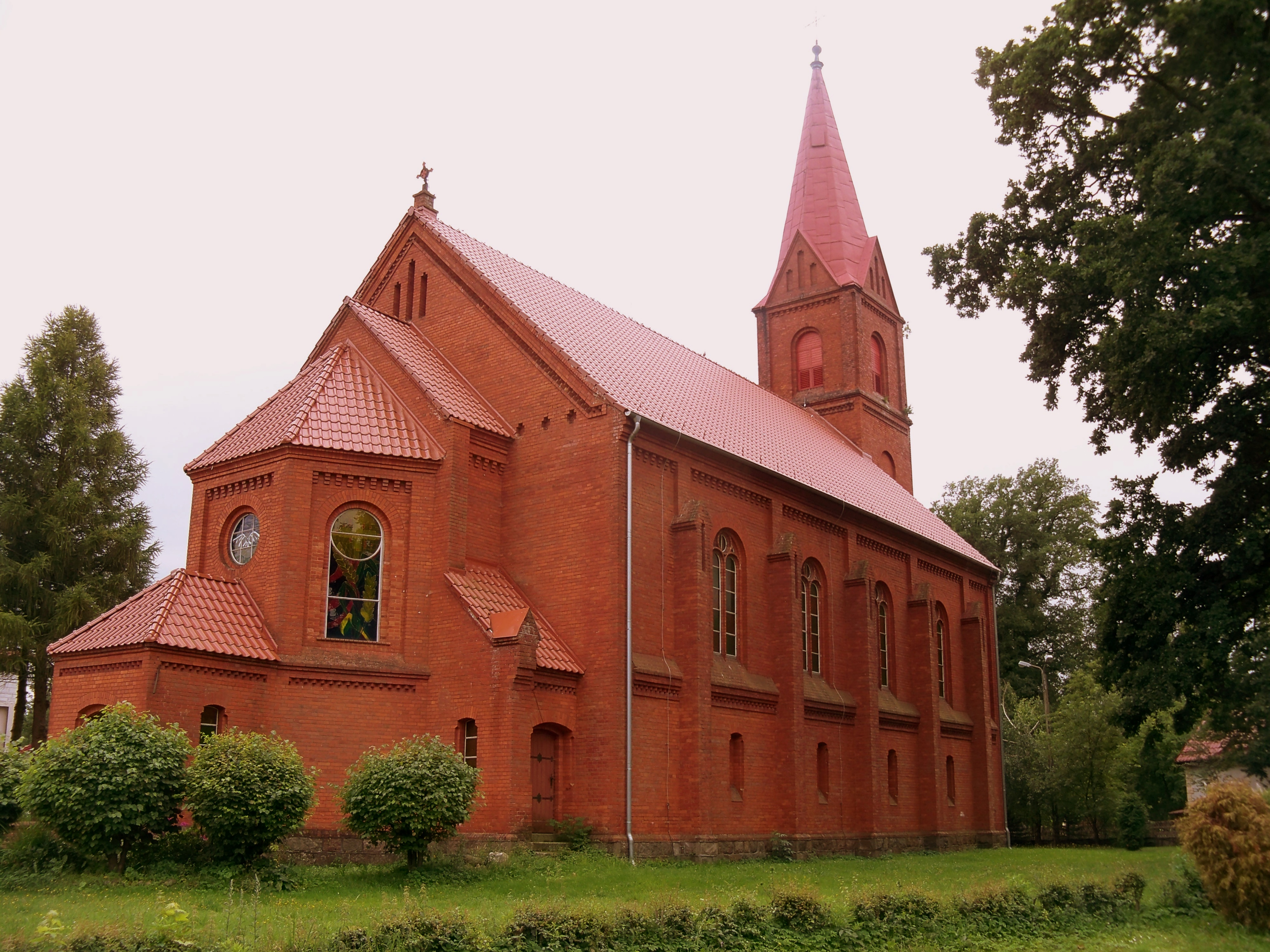
- Nativity of the Virgin Mary church

- Location within Poland
- Coordinates: 54°7′20″N 16°10′9″E
- Country: Poland
- Voivodeship: West Pomeranian
- County: Koszalin
- Gmina: Świeszyno
- Population: 497
- Website: https://www.swieszyno.pl

Świeszyno (Polish: [ɕfjɛˈʂɨnɔ]; German: Schwessin) is a village in Koszalin County, West Pomeranian Voivodeship, in north-western Poland. It is the seat of the gmina (administrative district) called Gmina Świeszyno. It lies approximately 7 km (4 mi) south of Koszalin and 131 km (81 mi) north-east of the regional capital Szczecin.

The village has a population of 497.

== Notable residents ==
- Ernst Pöppel (born 1940), German psychologist and neuroscientist
