= Wielin =

- Village
- Location within Poland
- Coordinates: 54°10′N 16°44′E
- Country: Poland
- Voivodeship: West Pomeranian
- County: Koszalin
- Gmina: Polanów

Wielin [ˈvjɛlin] (German: Vellin) is a village in the administrative district of Gmina Polanów, within Koszalin County, West Pomeranian Voivodeship, in north-western Poland. It lies approximately 8 km (5 mi) north of Polanów, 36 km (22 mi) east of Koszalin, and 165 km (103 mi) north-east of the regional capital Szczecin.
