= Rochowo =

- Village
- Location within Poland
- Coordinates: 54°8′N 16°45′E
- Country: Poland
- Voivodeship: West Pomeranian
- County: Koszalin
- Gmina: Polanów
- Population: 17

Rochowo [rɔˈxɔvɔ] (German: Rochow) is a village in the administrative district of Gmina Polanów, within Koszalin County, West Pomeranian Voivodeship, in north-western Poland. It lies approximately 5 km (3 mi) north-east of Polanów, 38 km (24 mi) east of Koszalin, and 164 km (102 mi) north-east of the regional capital Szczecin.

For the history of the region, see History of Pomerania.

The village has a population of 17.
