= Rzeczyca Wielka =

- Village
- Location within Poland
- Coordinates: 54°7′N 16°45′E
- Country: Poland
- Voivodeship: West Pomeranian
- County: Koszalin
- Gmina: Polanów
- Population: 300

Rzeczyca Wielka [ʐɛˈt͡ʂɨt͡sa ˈvjɛlka] (German: Reetz) is a village in the administrative district of Gmina Polanów, within Koszalin County, West Pomeranian Voivodeship, in north-western Poland. It lies approximately 4 km (2 mi) north-east of Polanów, 38 km (24 mi) east of Koszalin, and 163 km (101 mi) north-east of the regional capital Szczecin.

For the history of the region, see History of Pomerania.

The village has a population of 300.

== People ==
- Theodor von Below (1765-1839), Prussian generalleutnant
