= Nowe Bielice, West Pomeranian Voivodeship =

Nowe Bielice
- Village
- Location within Poland
- Coordinates: 54°9′29″N 16°6′17″E
- Country: Poland
- Voivodeship: West Pomeranian
- County: Koszalin
- Gmina: Biesiekierz
- Population: 1,522

Nowe Bielice [ˈnɔvɛ bjɛˈlit͡sɛ] (German: Neu Belz) is a village in the administrative district of Gmina Biesiekierz, within Koszalin County, West Pomeranian Voivodeship, in north-western Poland. It lies approximately 6 km (4 mi) north-east of Biesiekierz, 6 km (4 mi) south-west of Koszalin, and 130 km (81 mi) north-east of the regional capital Szczecin. The village has a population of 1522 people.

== History ==
For the history of the region, see History of Pomerania.
