= Kotłowo, West Pomeranian Voivodeship =

Kotłowo
- Village
- Location within Poland
- Coordinates: 54°8′25″N 16°3′59″E
- Country: Poland
- Voivodeship: West Pomeranian
- County: Koszalin
- Gmina: Biesiekierz
- Population: 170

Kotłowo [kɔˈtwɔvɔ] (German: Kothlow) is a village in the administrative district of Gmina Biesiekierz, within Koszalin County, West Pomeranian Voivodeship, in north-western Poland. It lies approximately 2 km (1 mi) east of Biesiekierz, 9 km (6 mi) south-west of Koszalin, and 127 km (79 mi) north-east of the regional capital Szczecin.

The village has a population of 170.
