= Domachowo, West Pomeranian Voivodeship =

Domachowo
- Village
- Location within Poland
- Coordinates: 54°11′0″N 16°35′25″E
- Country: Poland
- Voivodeship: West Pomeranian
- County: Koszalin
- Gmina: Polanów
- Population: 260

Domachowo [dɔmaˈxɔvɔ] (German: Hanshagen) is a village in the administrative district of Gmina Polanów, within Koszalin County, West Pomeranian Voivodeship, in north-western Poland. It lies approximately 12 km (7 mi) north-west of Polanów, 27 km (17 mi) east of Koszalin, and 157 km (98 mi) north-east of the regional capital Szczecin.

For the history of the region, see History of Pomerania.

The village has a population of 260.
