= Przybrodzie =

- Settlement
- Location within Poland
- Coordinates: 54°5′58″N 16°43′24″E
- Country: Poland
- Voivodeship: West Pomeranian
- County: Koszalin
- Gmina: Polanów

Przybrodzie [pʂɨˈbrɔd͡ʑɛ] is a settlement in the administrative district of Gmina Polanów, within Koszalin County, West Pomeranian Voivodeship, in north-western Poland. It lies approximately 2 km (1 mi) east of Polanów, 37 km (23 mi) east of Koszalin, and 160 km (99 mi) north-east of the regional capital Szczecin.

For the history of the region, see History of Pomerania.
