= Buszyno =

- Village
- Location within Poland
- Coordinates: 54°12′N 16°43′E
- Country: Poland
- Voivodeship: West Pomeranian
- County: Koszalin
- Gmina: Polanów
- Population: 130

Buszyno [buˈʂɨnɔ] (German: Bussin) is a village in the administrative district of Gmina Polanów, within Koszalin County, West Pomeranian Voivodeship, in north-western Poland. It lies approximately 12 km (7 mi) north of Polanów, 35 km (22 mi) east of Koszalin, and 165 km (103 mi) north-east of the regional capital Szczecin.

The village has a population of 130.
