= Gniazdowo, Koszalin County =

Gniazdowo
- Village
- Location within Poland
- Coordinates: 54°11′11″N 16°4′24″E
- Country: Poland
- Voivodeship: West Pomeranian
- County: Koszalin
- Gmina: Biesiekierz

Gniazdowo [ɡɲazˈdɔvɔ] (German: Plümenhagen) is a village in the administrative district of Gmina Biesiekierz, within Koszalin County, West Pomeranian Voivodeship, in north-western Poland. It lies approximately 7 km (4 mi) north of Biesiekierz, 8 km (5 mi) west of Koszalin, and 130 km (81 mi) north-east of the regional capital Szczecin.
