= Rosocha, West Pomeranian Voivodeship =

Rosocha
- Village
- Location within Poland
- Coordinates: 54°6′2″N 16°36′38″E
- Country: Poland
- Voivodeship: West Pomeranian
- County: Koszalin
- Gmina: Polanów
- Population: 100

Rosocha [rɔˈsɔxa] (formerly German Rotzog) is a village in the administrative district of Gmina Polanów, within Koszalin County, West Pomeranian Voivodeship, in north-western Poland. It lies approximately 6 km (4 mi) west of Polanów, 30 km (19 mi) east of Koszalin, and 154 km (96 mi) north-east of the regional capital Szczecin.

For the history of the region, see History of Pomerania.

The village has a population of 100.
