= Krąg, West Pomeranian Voivodeship =

Krąg
- Village
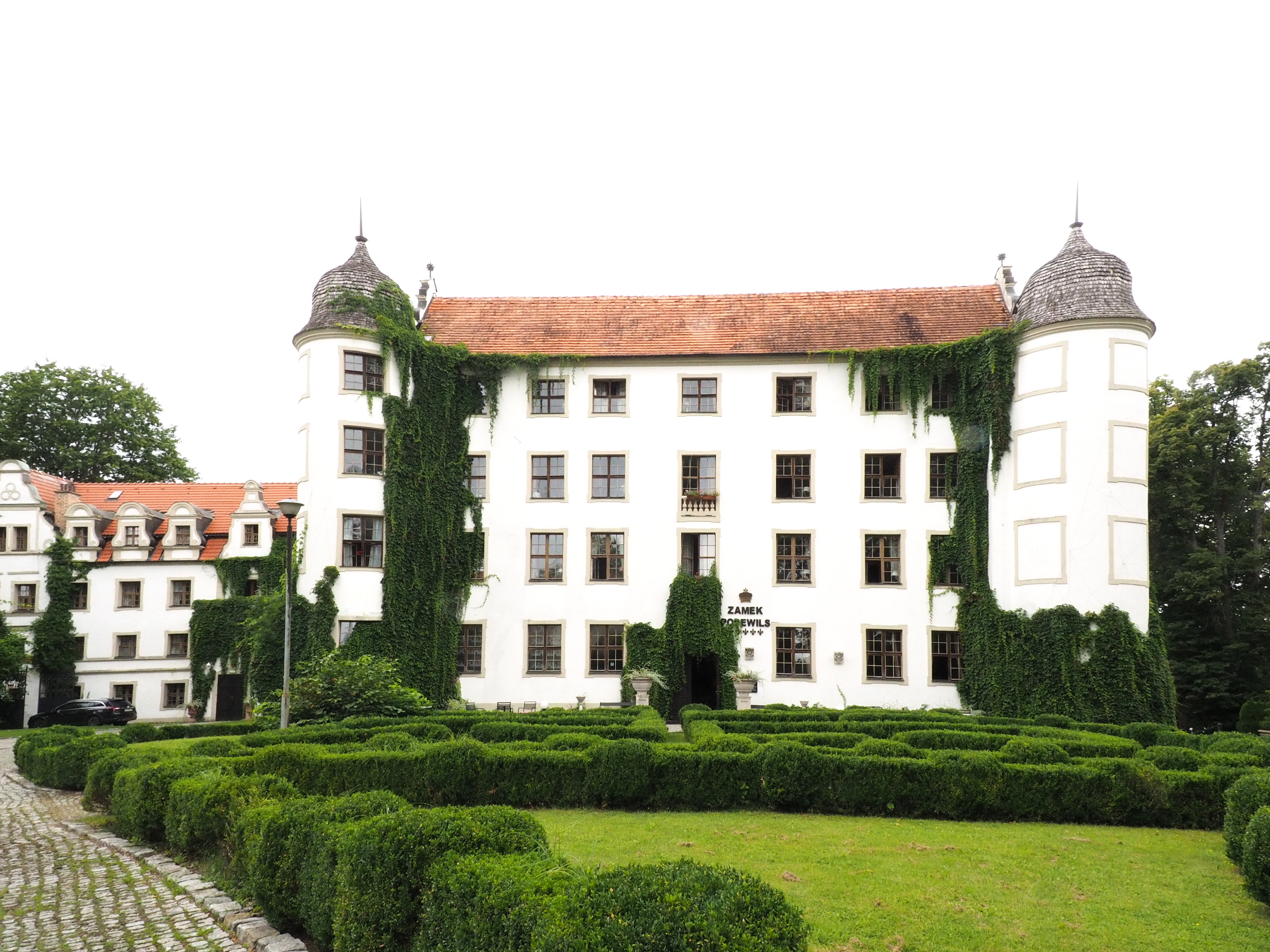
- Krąg Castle

- Location within Poland
- Coordinates: 54°12′50″N 16°42′5″E
- Country: Poland
- Voivodeship: West Pomeranian
- County: Koszalin
- Gmina: Polanów

Population
  - Total: 201
- Time zone: UTC+1 (CET)
  - Summer (DST): UTC+2 (CEST)
- Postal code: 76-010
- Vehicle registration: ZKO

Krąg [krɔnk] is a village in the administrative district of Gmina Polanów, within Koszalin County, West Pomeranian Voivodeship, in north-western Poland. It lies approximately 13 km (8 mi) north of Polanów, 34 km (21 mi) east of Koszalin, and 165 km (103 mi) north-east of the regional capital Szczecin.

For the history of the region, see History of Pomerania.

The village has a population of 201.
