= Cetuń =

- Village
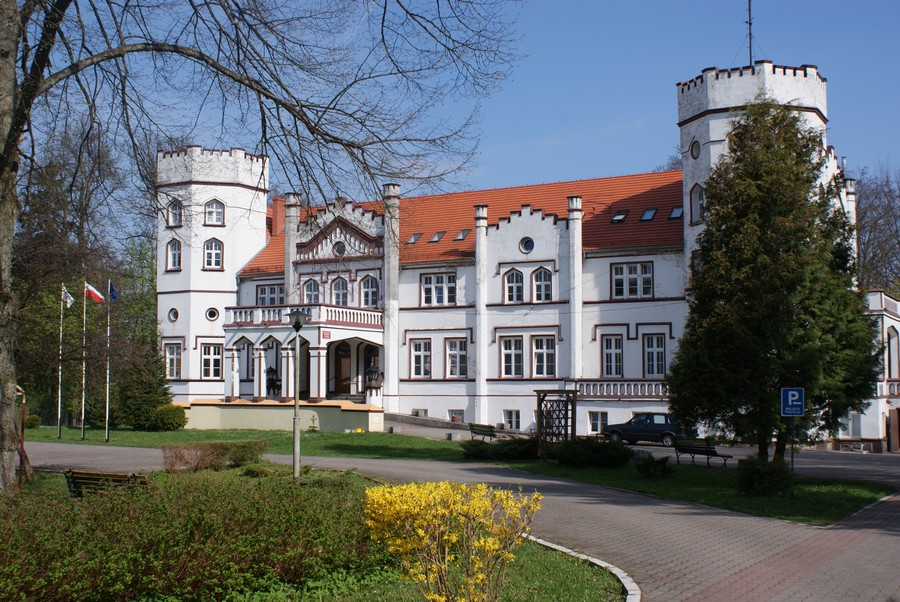
- Cetuń Palace

- Location within Poland
- Coordinates: 54°5′N 16°35′E
- Country: Poland
- Voivodeship: West Pomeranian
- County: Koszalin
- Gmina: Polanów
- Population: 230
- Time zone: UTC+1 (CET)
  - Summer (DST): UTC+2 (CEST)

Cetuń [ˈt͡sɛtuɲ] is a village in the administrative district of Gmina Polanów, within Koszalin County, West Pomeranian Voivodeship, in north-western Poland. It lies approximately 8 km (5 mi) west of Polanów, 29 km (18 mi) south-east of Koszalin, and 152 km (94 mi) north-east of the regional capital Szczecin.

For the history of the region, see History of Pomerania.

The village has a population of 230.
