= Bożenice =

- Village
- Location within Poland
- Coordinates: 54°11′55″N 16°37′49″E
- Country: Poland
- Voivodeship: West Pomeranian
- County: Koszalin
- Gmina: Polanów
- Population: 150

Bożenice [bɔʐɛˈnit͡sɛ] (German: Bosens) is a village in the administrative district of Gmina Polanów, within Koszalin County, West Pomeranian Voivodeship, in north-western Poland. It lies approximately 12 km (7 mi) north-west of Polanów, 30 km (19 mi) east of Koszalin, and 161 km (100 mi) north-east of the regional capital Szczecin.

The village has a population of 150.
