= Gosław, Koszalin County =

Gosław
- Village
- Location within Poland
- Coordinates: 53°59′45″N 16°46′45″E
- Country: Poland
- Voivodeship: West Pomeranian
- County: Koszalin
- Gmina: Polanów
- Population: 10

Gosław [ˈɡɔswaf] (German: Arnsberg) is a village in the administrative district of Gmina Polanów, within Koszalin County, West Pomeranian Voivodeship, in north-western Poland. It lies approximately 13 km (8 mi) south-east of Polanów, 45 km (28 mi) south-east of Koszalin, and 159 km (99 mi) north-east of the regional capital Szczecin.

For the history of the region, see History of Pomerania.

The village has a population of 10.
