= Świemino =

- Village
- Location within Poland
- Coordinates: 54°5′20″N 15°56′34″E
- Country: Poland
- Voivodeship: West Pomeranian
- County: Koszalin
- Gmina: Biesiekierz

Świemino (Polish: [ɕfjɛˈminɔ]; German: Schwemmin) is a village in the administrative district of Gmina Biesiekierz, within Koszalin County, West Pomeranian Voivodeship, in north-western Poland. It lies approximately 9 km (6 mi) south-west of Biesiekierz, 19 km (12 mi) south-west of Koszalin, and 117 km (73 mi) north-east of the regional capital Szczecin.

For the history of the region, see History of Pomerania.
