= Nowy Żelibórz =

- Village
- Location within Poland
- Coordinates: 54°3′N 16°47′E
- Country: Poland
- Voivodeship: West Pomeranian
- County: Koszalin
- Gmina: Polanów

Nowy Żelibórz [ˈnɔvɨ ʐɛˈlibuʂ] (German: Selberg B) is a village in the administrative district of Gmina Polanów, within Koszalin County, West Pomeranian Voivodeship, in north-western Poland. It lies approximately 8 km (5 mi) south-east of Polanów, 42 km (26 mi) east of Koszalin, and 162 km (101 mi) north-east of the regional capital Szczecin.

For the history of the region, see History of Pomerania.
