= Krytno =

- Village
- Location within Poland
- Coordinates: 54°10′25″N 16°32′18″E
- Country: Poland
- Voivodeship: West Pomeranian
- County: Koszalin
- Gmina: Polanów
- Population: 180

Krytno [ˈkrɨtnɔ] (formerly German Kritten) is a village in the administrative district of Gmina Polanów, within Koszalin County, West Pomeranian Voivodeship, in north-western Poland. It lies approximately 14 km (9 mi) north-west of Polanów, 24 km (15 mi) east of Koszalin, and 154 km (96 mi) north-east of the regional capital Szczecin.

For the history of the region, see History of Pomerania.

The village has a population of 180.
