= Rekowo, Koszalin County =

Rekowo
- Village
- Location within Poland
- Coordinates: 54°6′N 16°30′E
- Country: Poland
- Voivodeship: West Pomeranian
- County: Koszalin
- Gmina: Polanów
- Population: 100

Rekowo [rɛˈkɔvɔ] (formerly German Reckow) is a village in the administrative district of Gmina Polanów, within Koszalin County, West Pomeranian Voivodeship, in north-western Poland. It lies approximately 14 km (9 mi) west of Polanów, 23 km (14 mi) south-east of Koszalin, and 148 km (92 mi) north-east of the regional capital Szczecin.

For the history of the region, see History of Pomerania. The village has a population of 100.
