= Gołogóra, West Pomeranian Voivodeship =

Gołogóra
- Village
- Location within Poland
- Coordinates: 54°0′16″N 16°44′19″E
- Country: Poland
- Voivodeship: West Pomeranian
- County: Koszalin
- Gmina: Polanów
- Population: 120
- Website: http://www.gologora.com

Gołogóra [ɡɔwɔˈɡura] (German: Breitenberg) is a village in the administrative district of Gmina Polanów, within Koszalin County, West Pomeranian Voivodeship, in north-western Poland. It lies approximately 11 km (7 mi) south of Polanów, 42 km (26 mi) south-east of Koszalin, and 157 km (98 mi) north-east of the regional capital Szczecin.

For the history of the region, see History of Pomerania.

The village has a population of 120.
