= Żydowo, Koszalin County =

Żydowo
- Village
- Location within Poland
- Coordinates: 54°2′32″N 16°42′57″E
- Country: Poland
- Voivodeship: West Pomeranian
- County: Koszalin
- Gmina: Polanów
- Population: 1,000
- Website: http://www.zydowo.polanow.pl/

Żydowo [ʐɨˈdɔvɔ] (German: Sydow) is a village in the administrative district of Gmina Polanów, within Koszalin County, West Pomeranian Voivodeship, in north-western Poland. It lies approximately 7 km (4 mi) south of Polanów, 39 km (24 mi) south-east of Koszalin, and 157 km (98 mi) north-east of the regional capital Szczecin.

For the history of the region, see History of Pomerania.

In the 1960s, during the construction of a hydroelectric power plant, extensive archaeological research was carried out in Żydowo. These investigations led to the discovery of an early medieval necropolis consisting of 22 stone-and-earth barrows. The barrows were built in both quadrilateral and oval forms.

The mounds uncovered in Żydowo belong to the so-called Orzeszkowo-type cemeteries, which are characteristic exclusively of Pomerania. Their distinctive feature is the quadrilateral, most often square, barrow, usually enclosed by a stone setting. Inside, various stone constructions occur, such as burial chambers or paved surfaces. Necropoleis of this type are biritual in nature alongside predominant inhumations, cremation burials are also present and grave goods are usually modest.

Despite the considerable scholarly value of Orzeszkowo-type cemeteries, they have not been the subject of extensive research in recent decades. One of the few exceptions is the necropolis at Nowy Chorów in Słupsk County, Kępice Commune.
