= Mirotki, West Pomeranian Voivodeship =

Mirotki
- Settlement
- Location within Poland
- Coordinates: 54°11′36″N 16°26′11″E
- Country: Poland
- Voivodeship: West Pomeranian
- County: Koszalin
- Gmina: Polanów

Mirotki [miˈrɔtki] is a settlement in the administrative district of Gmina Polanów, within Koszalin County, West Pomeranian Voivodeship, in north-western Poland. It lies approximately 21 km (13 mi) north-west of Polanów, 17 km (11 mi) east of Koszalin, and 150 km (93 mi) north-east of the regional capital Szczecin.

For the history of the region, see History of Pomerania.
