= Dadzewo =

- Village
- Location within Poland
- Coordinates: 54°7′N 16°35′E
- Country: Poland
- Voivodeship: West Pomeranian
- County: Koszalin
- Gmina: Polanów
- Population: 190

Dadzewo [daˈd͡zɛvɔ] (German Datzow) is a village in the administrative district of Gmina Polanów, within Koszalin County, West Pomeranian Voivodeship, in north-western Poland. It lies approximately 8 km (5 mi) west of Polanów, 28 km (17 mi) east of Koszalin, and 153 km (95 mi) north-east of the regional capital Szczecin.

For the history of the region, see History of Pomerania.
