= Gilewo =

- Settlement
- Location within Poland
- Coordinates: 54°6′36″N 16°38′50″E
- Country: Poland
- Voivodeship: West Pomeranian
- County: Koszalin
- Gmina: Polanów

Gilewo [ɡiˈlɛvɔ] (German: Wilhelmshof) is a settlement in the administrative district of Gmina Polanów, within Koszalin County, West Pomeranian Voivodeship, in north-western Poland. It lies approximately 4 km (2 mi) west of Polanów, 32 km (20 mi) east of Koszalin, and 157 km (98 mi) north-east of the regional capital Szczecin.

For the history of the region, see History of Pomerania.
