= Parsowo =

- Village
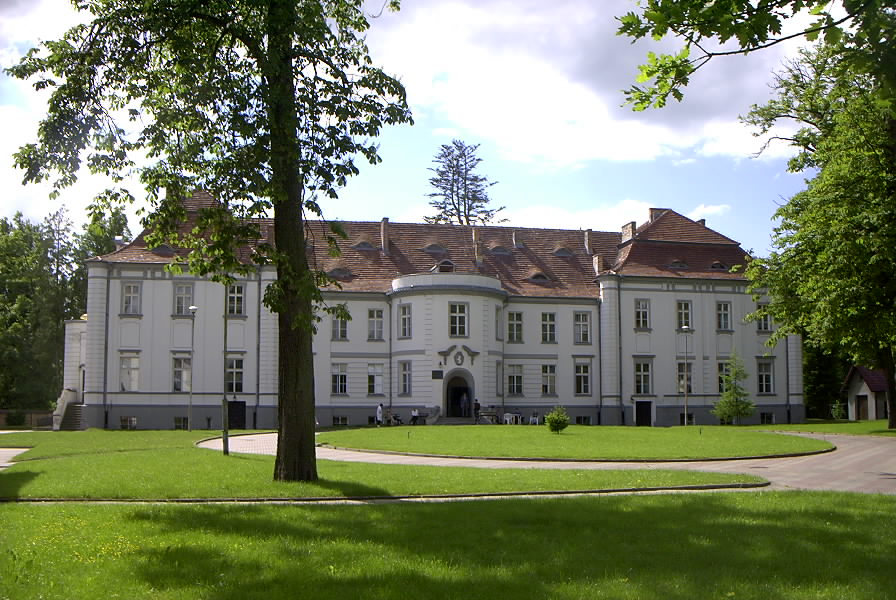
- Palace in Parsowo

- Location within Poland
- Coordinates: 54°5′37″N 15°58′21″E
- Country: Poland
- Voivodeship: West Pomeranian
- County: Koszalin
- Gmina: Biesiekierz

Parsowo [parˈsɔvɔ] (German: Parsow) is a village in the administrative district of Gmina Biesiekierz, within Koszalin County, West Pomeranian Voivodeship, in north-western Poland. It lies approximately 7 km (4 mi) south-west of Biesiekierz, 17 km (11 mi) south-west of Koszalin, and 119 km (74 mi) north-east of the regional capital Szczecin.

For the history of the region, see History of Pomerania.
