= Stołpie, West Pomeranian Voivodeship =

Stołpie
- Village
- Location within Poland
- Coordinates: 54°10′33″N 16°28′42″E
- Country: Poland
- Voivodeship: West Pomeranian
- County: Koszalin
- Gmina: Polanów

Stołpie [ˈstɔu̯pjɛ] (German: Kuhstolp) is a village in the administrative district of Gmina Polanów, within Koszalin County, West Pomeranian Voivodeship, in north-western Poland. It lies approximately 17 km (11 mi) north-west of Polanów, 20 km (12 mi) east of Koszalin, and 151 km (94 mi) north-east of the regional capital Szczecin.

For the history of the region, see History of Pomerania.
