= Symbols of Koszalin County =

Symbols of Gdańsk County, Poland

Coat of arms of Gdańsk County
- Adopted: 20 December 2002
- Use: Koszalin County

Koszalin County
- Proportion: 5:8
- Adopted: 13 June 2001

The flag that serves as the symbols of the Koszalin County, West Pomeranian Voivodeship, in northwest Poland was established in 2001, and the coat of arms, in 2002.

== Design ==
The coat of arms of the Koszalin County consists of a white Iberian style escutcheon (shield) with square top and rounded base. It includes a red griffin facing left, with yellow (golden) beak, tongue, front paws, and claws of its back paws. It stands on its back legs, and holds a blue banner on a white pole, in its front paws. The banner is flown over griffin's head, and features eight six-pointed yellow (golden) stars, placed in two vertical rows, each containing four of them. They represents the number of the gminas (municipalities) that the county consists of. Those are: Będzino, Biesiekierz, Bobolice, Manowo, Mielno, Polanów, Sianów, and Świeszyno. Below the griffin are two rows of horizontal blue wavy stripes.

The flag of the county includes a griffin with the banner from the flag, placed in the centre of the white background. The flag proportions have the aspect ratio of its height to its width equal 5:8.

The griffin is a traditional symbol of the West Pomerania, used since 12th century. Between 12th and 13th century, the griffin become the symbol of the House of Griffin, that ruled in that area. Subsequently, the red griffin on the white background had become the symbol of the Duchy of the Pomerania-Stettin. In the 1730s, that design had become the symbol of the entire West Pomerania. The white and blue colours were used as the flag of the Province of Pomerania, from 1882 to 1935. The province included modern day territory of Koszalin County.

== History ==
The flag was adopted by the county council on 13 June 2001, and the coat of arms, on 20 December 2002.

== See also ==
- flag of Koszalin
