= Kościernica, Koszalin County =

Kościernica
- Village
- Location within Poland
- Coordinates: 54°9′42″N 16°26′37″E
- Country: Poland
- Voivodeship: West Pomeranian
- County: Koszalin
- Gmina: Polanów
- Population: 284
- Website: http://www.kosciernica.prv.pl/

Kościernica [kɔɕt͡ɕɛrˈnit͡sa] (German: Kösternitz) is a village in the administrative district of Gmina Polanów, within Koszalin County, West Pomeranian Voivodeship, in north-western Poland. It lies approximately 19 km (12 mi) west of Polanów, 18 km (11 mi) east of Koszalin, and 148 km (92 mi) north-east of the regional capital Szczecin.

For the history of the region, see History of Pomerania.

The village has a population of 284.
