= Warnino, Koszalin County =

Warnino
- Village
- Location within Poland
- Coordinates: 54°7′17″N 15°56′37″E
- Country: Poland
- Voivodeship: West Pomeranian
- County: Koszalin
- Gmina: Biesiekierz

Warnino [varˈninɔ] (German: Warnin) is a village in the administrative district of Gmina Biesiekierz, within Koszalin County, West Pomeranian Voivodeship, in north-western Poland. It lies approximately 7 km (4 mi) west of Biesiekierz, 18 km (11 mi) south-west of Koszalin, and 119 km (74 mi) north-east of the regional capital Szczecin.

For the history of the region, see History of Pomerania.
