= Stare Bielice, West Pomeranian Voivodeship =

Stare Bielice
- Village
- Location within Poland
- Coordinates: 54°10′37″N 16°6′54″E
- Country: Poland
- Voivodeship: West Pomeranian
- County: Koszalin
- Gmina: Biesiekierz
- Population: 1,000

Stare Bielice [ˈstarɛ bjɛˈlit͡sɛ] (German: Alt Belz) is a village in the administrative district of Gmina Biesiekierz, within Koszalin County, West Pomeranian Voivodeship, in north-western Poland. It lies approximately 7 km (4 mi) north-east of Biesiekierz, 5 km (3 mi) west of Koszalin, and 132 km (82 mi) north-east of the regional capital Szczecin.

For the history of the region, see History of Pomerania.

The village has a population of 1,000.

== Notable residents ==
- Günther Maleuda (1931-2012), German politician
