= Głusza, Koszalin County =

Głusza
- Settlement
- Location within Poland
- Coordinates: 54°2′41″N 16°44′43″E
- Country: Poland
- Voivodeship: West Pomeranian
- County: Koszalin
- Gmina: Polanów

Głusza [ˈɡwuʂa] (formerly German: Bärenlager) is a settlement in the administrative district of Gmina Polanów, within Koszalin County, West Pomeranian Voivodeship, in north-western Poland. It lies approximately 7 km (4 mi) south-east of Polanów, 40 km (25 mi) south-east of Koszalin, and 159 km (99 mi) north-east of the regional capital Szczecin.

For the history of the region, see History of Pomerania.
