= Kępiny, West Pomeranian Voivodeship =

Kępiny
- Village
- Location within Poland
- Coordinates: 54°0′57″N 16°42′47″E
- Country: Poland
- Voivodeship: West Pomeranian
- County: Koszalin
- Gmina: Polanów

Kępiny [kɛmˈpinɨ] (German: Neumühlenkamp) is a village in the administrative district of Gmina Polanów, within Koszalin County, West Pomeranian Voivodeship, in north-western Poland. It lies approximately 10 km (6 mi) south of Polanów, 40 km (25 mi) south-east of Koszalin, and 156 km (97 mi) north-east of the regional capital Szczecin.

For the history of the region, see History of Pomerania.
