= Garbno =

Garbno may refer to the following places:

- Garbno, Gmina Barciany in Warmian-Masurian Voivodeship (north Poland)
- Garbno, Gmina Korsze in Warmian-Masurian Voivodeship (north Poland)
- Garbno, West Pomeranian Voivodeship (north-west Poland)
