= Laski Koszalińskie =

- Village
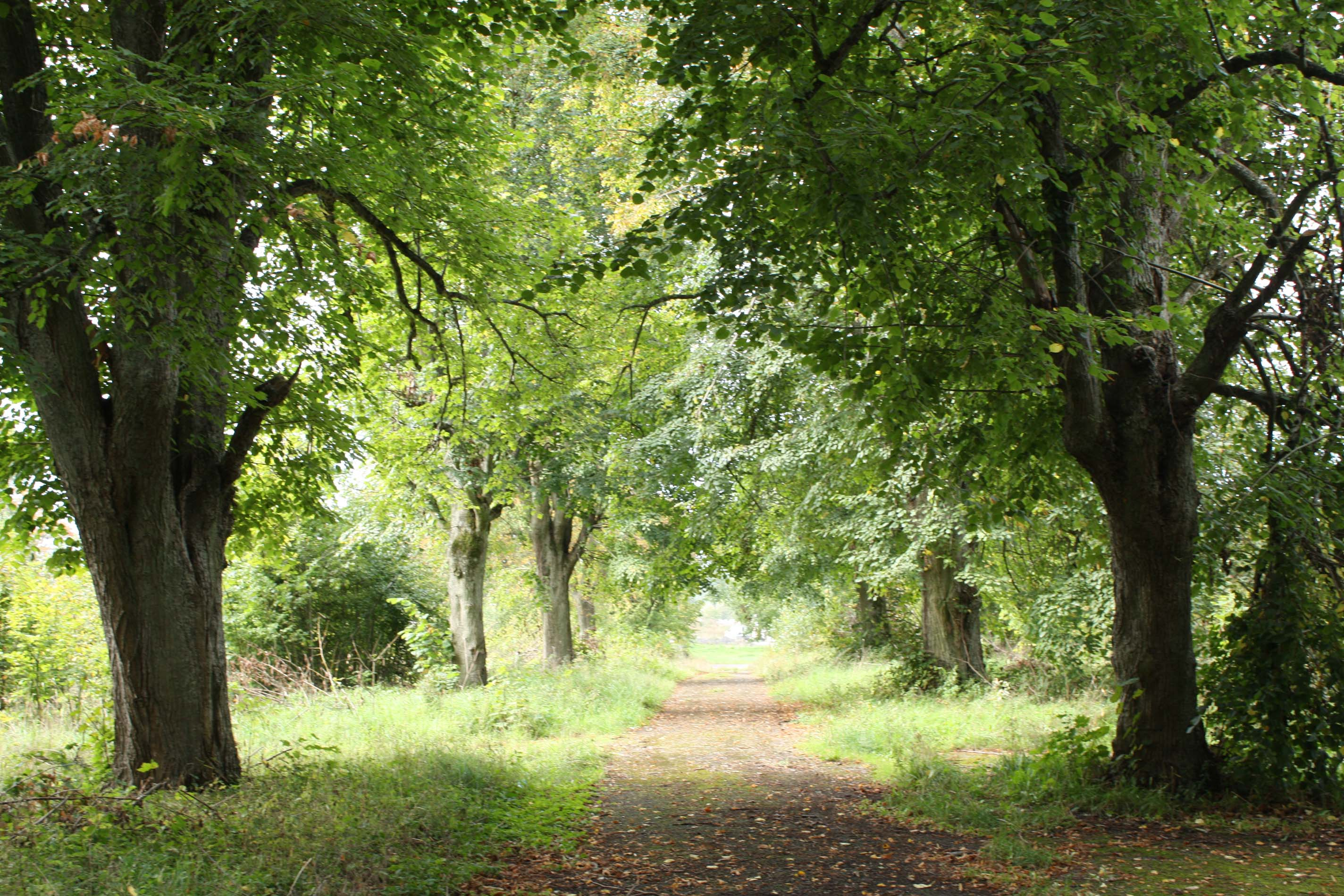
- Park in Laski Koszalińskie

- Location within Poland
- Coordinates: 54°8′25″N 16°4′57″E
- Country: Poland
- Voivodeship: West Pomeranian
- County: Koszalin
- Gmina: Biesiekierz
- Population: 260
- Time zone: UTC+1 (CET)
  - Summer (DST): UTC+2 (CEST)
- Vehicle registration: ZKO

Laski Koszalińskie [ˈlaski kɔʂaˈliɲskʲɛ] is a village in the administrative district of Gmina Biesiekierz, within Koszalin County, West Pomeranian Voivodeship, in north-western Poland. It lies approximately 3 km (2 mi) east of Biesiekierz, 9 km (6 mi) south-west of Koszalin, and 128 km (80 mi) north-east of the regional capital Szczecin.

The village has a population of 260.

== History ==
In the 10th century, the region became part of the emerging Polish state under its first historic ruler Mieszko I. Following Poland's fragmentation into smaller duchies, it formed part of the Duchy of Pomerania. From the 18th century it formed part of Prussia, and from 1871 to 1945 it was also part of Germany. During World War II, a forced labour subcamp of the Nazi prison in Koszalin was operated by the Germans in the village. After the war, the area became again part of Poland.
