= Warblewo, West Pomeranian Voivodeship =

Warblewo
- Village
- Location within Poland
- Coordinates: 54°7′47″N 16°43′43″E
- Country: Poland
- Voivodeship: West Pomeranian
- County: Koszalin
- Gmina: Polanów
- Population: 70

Warblewo [varˈblɛvɔ] (German Varbelow) is a village in the administrative district of Gmina Polanów, within Koszalin County, West Pomeranian Voivodeship, in north-western Poland. It lies approximately 4 km (2 mi) north-east of Polanów, 37 km (23 mi) east of Koszalin, and 162 km (101 mi) north-east of the regional capital Szczecin.

The village has a population of 70.
