= Sowinko =

- Village
- Location within Poland
- Coordinates: 54°11′N 16°30′E
- Country: Poland
- Voivodeship: West Pomeranian
- County: Koszalin
- Gmina: Polanów
- Population: 100

Sowinko [sɔˈvinkɔ] (formerly German Neu Zowen) is a village in the administrative district of Gmina Polanów, within Koszalin County, West Pomeranian Voivodeship, in north-western Poland. It lies approximately 16 km (10 mi) north-west of Polanów, 21 km (13 mi) east of Koszalin, and 153 km (95 mi) north-east of the regional capital Szczecin.

For the history of the region, see History of Pomerania.

The village has a population of 100.
