= Wietrzno, West Pomeranian Voivodeship =

Wietrzno
- Village
- Location within Poland
- Coordinates: 54°4′N 16°40′E
- Country: Poland
- Voivodeship: West Pomeranian
- County: Koszalin
- Gmina: Polanów
- Population: 100

Wietrzno [ˈvjɛtʂnɔ] (formerly German Vettrin) is a village in the administrative district of Gmina Polanów, within Koszalin County, West Pomeranian Voivodeship, in north-western Poland. It lies approximately 5 km (3 mi) south-west of Polanów, 35 km (22 mi) east of Koszalin, and 155 km (96 mi) north-east of the regional capital Szczecin.

For the history of the region, see History of Pomerania.

The village has a population of 100.
