= Czarnowiec, West Pomeranian Voivodeship =

Czarnowiec
- Settlement
- Location within Poland
- Coordinates: 54°6′8″N 16°41′9″E
- Country: Poland
- Voivodeship: West Pomeranian
- County: Koszalin
- Gmina: Polanów

Czarnowiec [t͡ʂarˈnɔvjɛt͡s] (German: Tannenwalde) is a settlement in the administrative district of Gmina Polanów, within Koszalin County, West Pomeranian Voivodeship, in north-western Poland. It lies approximately 1 km (1 mi) south of Polanów, 34 km (21 mi) east of Koszalin, and 158 km (98 mi) north-east of the regional capital Szczecin.

For the history of the region, see History of Pomerania.
