= Karsinka =

- Village
- Location within Poland
- Coordinates: 54°5′N 16°31′E
- Country: Poland
- Voivodeship: West Pomeranian
- County: Koszalin
- Gmina: Polanów
- Population: 30

Karsinka [karˈɕinka] (formerly German Karzin) is a village in the administrative district of Gmina Polanów, within Koszalin County, West Pomeranian Voivodeship, in north-western Poland. It lies approximately 13 km (8 mi) west of Polanów, 25 km (16 mi) south-east of Koszalin, and 148 km (92 mi) north-east of the regional capital Szczecin.

For the history of the region, see History of Pomerania.

The village has a population of 30.
