= Chocimino =

- Village
- Location within Poland
- Coordinates: 54°3′N 16°40′E
- Country: Poland
- Voivodeship: West Pomeranian
- County: Koszalin
- Gmina: Polanów

Chocimino [xɔt͡ɕiˈminɔ] (German: Gutzmin) is a village in the administrative district of Gmina Polanów, within Koszalin County, West Pomeranian Voivodeship, in north-western Poland. It lies approximately 6 km (4 mi) south of Polanów, 35 km (22 mi) south-east of Koszalin, and 155 km (96 mi) north-east of the regional capital Szczecin.

For the history of the region, see History of Pomerania.

== Notable residents ==
- Dubislav Gneomar von Natzmer (1654–1739), Prussian fieldmarshall
