= Rzeczyca Mała =

- Settlement
- Location within Poland
- Coordinates: 54°6′56″N 16°47′20″E
- Country: Poland
- Voivodeship: West Pomeranian
- County: Koszalin
- Gmina: Polanów

Rzeczyca Mała (Polish pronunciation: [ʐɛˈt͡ʂɨt͡sa ˈmawa]; German: Klein Reetz) is a settlement in the administrative district of Gmina Polanów, within Koszalin County, West Pomeranian Voivodeship, in north-western Poland. It lies approximately 7 km (4 mi) east of Polanów, 41 km (25 mi) east of Koszalin, and 165 km (103 mi) north-east of the regional capital Szczecin.
