= Nadbór =

- Village
- Location within Poland
- Coordinates: 54°8′8″N 16°34′16″E
- Country: Poland
- Voivodeship: West Pomeranian
- County: Koszalin
- Gmina: Polanów

Nadbór [ˈnadbur] is a village in the administrative district of Gmina Polanów, within Koszalin County, West Pomeranian Voivodeship, in north-western Poland. It lies approximately 10 km (6 mi) north-west of Polanów, 26 km (16 mi) east of Koszalin, and 154 km (96 mi) north-east of the regional capital Szczecin.

For the history of the region, see History of Pomerania.
