= Dalimierz, Koszalin County =

Dalimierz
- Village
- Location within Poland
- Coordinates: 53°59′37″N 16°45′20″E
- Country: Poland
- Voivodeship: West Pomeranian
- County: Koszalin
- Gmina: Polanów
- Population: 10

Dalimierz [daˈlimjɛʂ] (German: Johannishof) is a village in the administrative district of Gmina Polanów, within Koszalin County, West Pomeranian Voivodeship, in north-western Poland. It lies approximately 13 km (8 mi) south of Polanów, 43 km (27 mi) south-east of Koszalin, and 157 km (98 mi) north-east of the regional capital Szczecin.

For the history of the region, see History of Pomerania.

The village has a population of 10.
