= Bukowo, Koszalin County =

Bukowo
- Village
- Location within Poland
- Coordinates: 54°10′N 16°36′E
- Country: Poland
- Voivodeship: West Pomeranian
- County: Koszalin
- Gmina: Polanów
- Population: 320

Bukowo [buˈkɔvɔ] (German: Buckow) is a village in the administrative district of Gmina Polanów, within Koszalin County, West Pomeranian Voivodeship, in north-western Poland. It lies approximately 10 km (6 mi) north-west of Polanów, 28 km (17 mi) east of Koszalin, and 157 km (98 mi) north-east of the regional capital Szczecin.

The village has a population of 320.
