= Nacław, West Pomeranian Voivodeship =

Nacław
- Village
- Location within Poland
- Coordinates: 54°8′28″N 16°31′30″E
- Country: Poland
- Voivodeship: West Pomeranian
- County: Koszalin
- Gmina: Polanów
- Population: 560

Nacław [ˈnat͡swaf] (German: Natzlaff) is a village in the administrative district of Gmina Polanów, within Koszalin County, West Pomeranian Voivodeship, in north-western Poland. It lies approximately 13 km (8 mi) west of Polanów, 23 km (14 mi) east of Koszalin, and 151 km (94 mi) north-east of the regional capital Szczecin.

For the history of the region, see History of Pomerania.

The village has a population of 560.
