= Nosowo, Koszalin County =

Nosowo
- Village
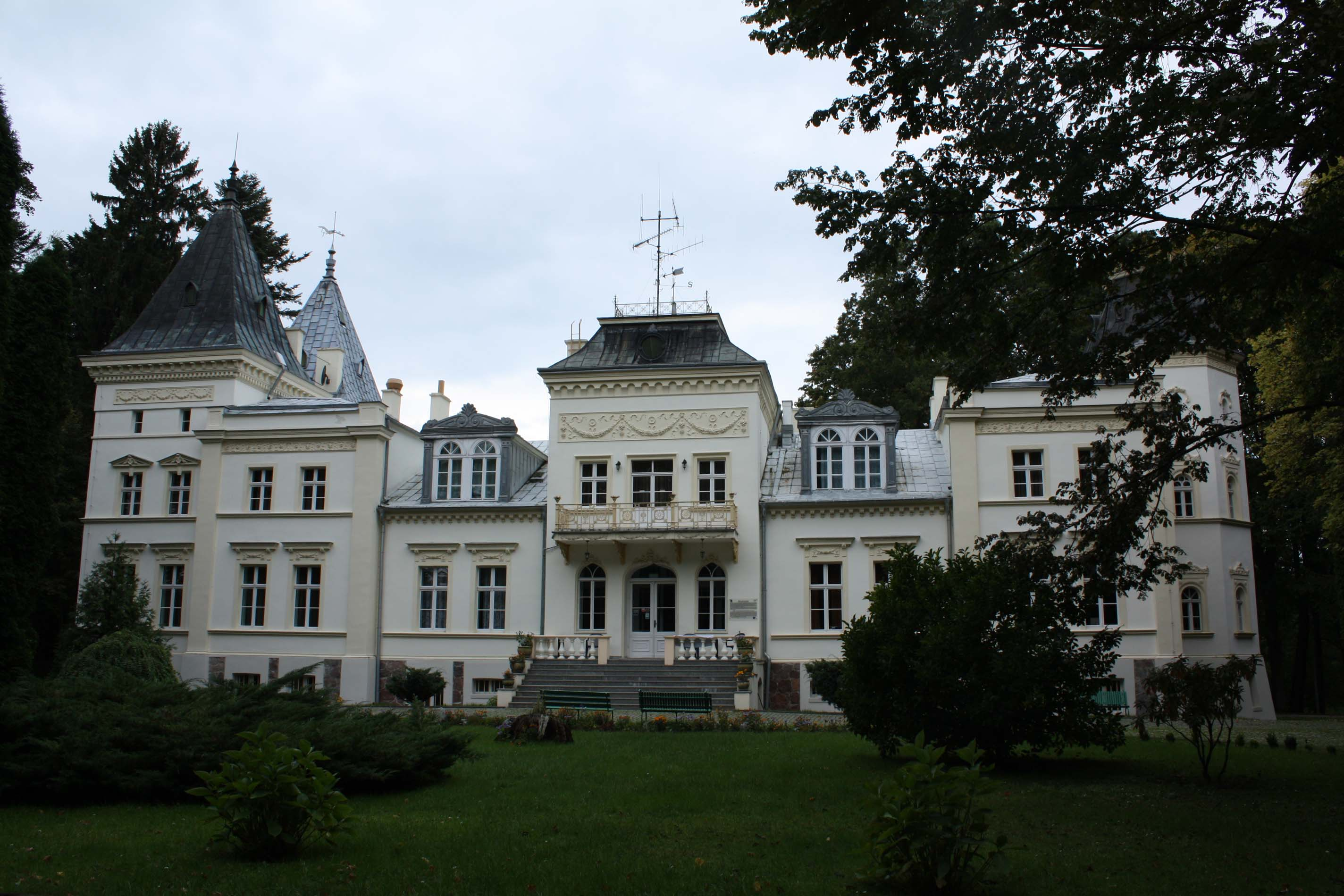
- Nosowo Palace

- Location within Poland
- Coordinates: 54°6′19″N 16°0′25″E
- Country: Poland
- Voivodeship: West Pomeranian
- County: Koszalin
- Gmina: Biesiekierz
- Time zone: UTC+1 (CET)
  - Summer (DST): UTC+2 (CEST)
- Vehicle registration: ZKO

Nosowo [nɔˈsɔvɔ] is a village in the administrative district of Gmina Biesiekierz, within Koszalin County, West Pomeranian Voivodeship, in north-western Poland. It lies approximately 4 km (2 mi) south-west of Biesiekierz, 15 km (9 mi) south-west of Koszalin, and 121 km (75 mi) north-east of the regional capital Szczecin.

It is located in the historic region of Pomerania.
