= Jacinki =

- Village
- Location within Poland
- Coordinates: 54°8′N 16°37′E
- Country: Poland
- Voivodeship: West Pomeranian
- County: Koszalin
- Gmina: Polanów
- Population: 221

Jacinki [jaˈt͡ɕinki] (German Jatzingen) is a village in the administrative district of Gmina Polanów, within Koszalin County, West Pomeranian Voivodeship, in north-western Poland. It lies approximately 7 km (4 mi) north-west of Polanów, 29 km (18 mi) east of Koszalin, and 156 km (97 mi) north-east of the regional capital Szczecin.

For the history of the region, see History of Pomerania.

The village has a population of 221.
