= Parnowo =

- Village
- Location within Poland
- Coordinates: 54°9′47″N 16°2′17″E
- Country: Poland
- Voivodeship: West Pomeranian
- County: Koszalin
- Gmina: Biesiekierz

Parnowo [parˈnɔvɔ] (German: Parnow) is a village in the administrative district of Gmina Biesiekierz, within Koszalin County, West Pomeranian Voivodeship, in north-western Poland. It lies approximately 4 km (2 mi) north of Biesiekierz, 10 km (6 mi) west of Koszalin, and 127 km (79 mi) north-east of the regional capital Szczecin.

For the history of the region, see History of Pomerania.

== Daughters and sons of Parnowo ==
- Alfons Pawelczyk, Second Mayor of Hamburg
