= Szczerbin, West Pomeranian Voivodeship =

Szczerbin
- Settlement
- Location within Poland
- Coordinates: 54°05′27″N 16°33′42″E
- Country: Poland
- Voivodeship: West Pomeranian
- County: Koszalin
- Gmina: Polanów

Szczerbin [ˈʂt͡ʂɛrbin] (German: Karlshof) is a settlement in the administrative district of Gmina Polanów, within Koszalin County, West Pomeranian Voivodeship, in north-western Poland.

For the history of the region, see History of Pomerania.
