= Liszkowo =

Liszkowo may refer to the following places:

- Liszkowo, Greater Poland Voivodeship (west-central Poland)
- Liszkowo, Kuyavian-Pomeranian Voivodeship (north-central Poland)
- Liszkowo, Koszalin County in West Pomeranian Voivodeship (north-west Poland)
- Liszkowo, Szczecinek County in West Pomeranian Voivodeship (north-west Poland)
