= Cierpinski =

Cierpinski is a Polish language habitational surname for someone from any of various places called Cieszyn. Notable people with the name include:

- Maritta Cierpinski (born 1950), German middle-distance runner
- Waldemar Cierpinski (born 1950), former East German athlete
