= Tatów =

- Settlement
- Location within Poland
- Coordinates: 54°10′17″N 16°04′57″E
- Country: Poland
- Voivodeship: West Pomeranian
- County: Koszalin
- Gmina: Biesiekierz

Tatów [ˈtatuf] is a settlement in the administrative district of Gmina Biesiekierz, within Koszalin County, West Pomeranian Voivodeship, in north-western Poland.

== See also ==
History of Pomerania
