= Knieja, West Pomeranian Voivodeship =

Knieja
- Settlement
- Location within Poland
- Coordinates: 54°08′39″N 16°40′31″E
- Country: Poland
- Voivodeship: West Pomeranian
- County: Koszalin
- Gmina: Polanów

Knieja [ˈkɲɛja] is a settlement in the administrative district of Gmina Polanów, within Koszalin County, West Pomeranian Voivodeship, in north-western Poland.
