= Gostkowo, West Pomeranian Voivodeship =

Gostkowo
- Settlement
- Location within Poland
- Coordinates: 54°00′40″N 16°46′39″E
- Country: Poland
- Voivodeship: West Pomeranian
- County: Koszalin
- Gmina: Polanów

Gostkowo [ɡɔstˈkɔvɔ] is a settlement in the administrative district of Gmina Polanów, within Koszalin County, West Pomeranian Voivodeship, in north-western Poland.
