= Rutkowo, West Pomeranian Voivodeship =

Rutkowo
- Settlement
- Location within Poland
- Coordinates: 54°07′09″N 16°02′08″E
- Country: Poland
- Voivodeship: West Pomeranian
- County: Koszalin
- Gmina: Biesiekierz

Rutkowo [rutˈkɔvɔ] is a settlement in the administrative district of Gmina Biesiekierz, within Koszalin County, West Pomeranian Voivodeship, in north-western Poland.

For the history of the region, see History of Pomerania.
