= Bagnica, West Pomeranian Voivodeship =

Bagnica
- Settlement
- Location within Poland
- Coordinates: 54°01′56″N 16°45′38″E
- Country: Poland
- Voivodeship: West Pomeranian
- County: Koszalin
- Gmina: Polanów

Bagnica [baɡˈnit͡sa] (German: Pagelsland) is a settlement in the administrative district of Gmina Polanów, within Koszalin County, West Pomeranian Voivodeship, in north-western Poland.
