= Witolubie =

- Settlement
- Location within Poland
- Coordinates: 54°11′00″N 16°03′33″E
- Country: Poland
- Voivodeship: West Pomeranian
- County: Koszalin
- Gmina: Biesiekierz

Witolubie [vitɔˈlubjɛ] (German: Knisterkathen) is a settlement in the administrative district of Gmina Biesiekierz, within Koszalin County, West Pomeranian Voivodeship, in north-western Poland.
