= Jaromierz Polanowski =

- Settlement
- Location within Poland
- Coordinates: 54°05′24″N 16°40′46″E
- Country: Poland
- Voivodeship: West Pomeranian
- County: Koszalin
- Gmina: Polanów

Jaromierz Polanowski [jaˈrɔmjɛʂ pɔlaˈnɔfski] (German: Ludwigshof) is a settlement in the administrative district of Gmina Polanów, within Koszalin County, West Pomeranian Voivodeship, in north-western Poland.

For the history of the region, see History of Pomerania.
