= Żdżar =

Żdżar may refer to the following places:

- Żdżar, Masovian Voivodeship (east-central Poland)
- Żdżar, Koszalin County in West Pomeranian Voivodeship (north-west Poland)
- Żdżar, Szczecinek County in West Pomeranian Voivodeship (north-west Poland)
