= Chocimino Leśne =

- Settlement
- Location within Poland
- Coordinates: 54°03′52″N 16°42′54″E
- Country: Poland
- Voivodeship: West Pomeranian
- County: Koszalin
- Gmina: Polanów

Chocimino Leśne [xɔt͡ɕiˈminɔ ˈlɛɕnɛ] is a settlement in the administrative district of Gmina Polanów, within Koszalin County, West Pomeranian Voivodeship, in north-western Poland.
