= Smugi, Koszalin County =

Smugi
- Settlement
- Location within Poland
- Coordinates: 54°05′50″N 16°38′53″E
- Country: Poland
- Voivodeship: West Pomeranian
- County: Koszalin
- Gmina: Polanów

Smugi [ˈsmuɡi] (German: Thalhof) is a settlement in the administrative district of Gmina Polanów, within Koszalin County, West Pomeranian Voivodeship, in north-western Poland.

For the history of the region, see History of Pomerania.
