= Kopaniec =

Kopaniec may refer to the following places in Poland:

- Kopaniec, Lower Silesian Voivodeship (south-west Poland)
- Kopaniec, West Pomeranian Voivodeship (north-west Poland)
