= Bartlewo, West Pomeranian Voivodeship =

Bartlewo
- Settlement
- Location within Poland
- Coordinates: 54°3′49″N 16°45′9″E
- Country: Poland
- Voivodeship: West Pomeranian
- County: Koszalin
- Gmina: Polanów
- Population: 12

Bartlewo [barˈtlɛvɔ] is a settlement in the administrative district of Gmina Polanów, within Koszalin County, West Pomeranian Voivodeship, in north-western Poland.

The settlement has a population of 12.
