= Kierzkowo, Koszalin County =

Kierzkowo
- Settlement
- Location within Poland
- Coordinates: 54°02′09″N 16°43′47″E
- Country: Poland
- Voivodeship: West Pomeranian
- County: Koszalin
- Gmina: Polanów

Kierzkowo [kʲɛʂˈkɔvɔ] (German: Grünheide) is a settlement in the administrative district of Gmina Polanów, within Koszalin County, West Pomeranian Voivodeship, in north-western Poland.

For the history of the region, see History of Pomerania.
