= Świeminko =

- Settlement
- Location within Poland
- Coordinates: 54°05′29″N 15°55′11″E
- Country: Poland
- Voivodeship: West Pomeranian
- County: Koszalin
- Gmina: Biesiekierz

Świeminko (Polish pronunciation: [ɕfjɛˈminkɔ]) is a settlement in the administrative district of Gmina Biesiekierz, within Koszalin County, West Pomeranian Voivodeship, in northwestern Poland.

== See also ==
- History of Pomerania
