= Karsina =

- Village
- Location within Poland
- Coordinates: 54°5′20″N 16°29′57″E
- Country: Poland
- Voivodeship: West Pomeranian
- County: Koszalin
- Gmina: Polanów
- Population: 30

Karsina [karˈɕina] (German Karzin) is a village in the administrative district of Gmina Polanów, within Koszalin County, West Pomeranian Voivodeship, in north-western Poland. It lies approximately 14 km (9 mi) west of Polanów, 24 km (15 mi) south-east of Koszalin, and 147 km (91 mi) north-east of the regional capital Szczecin.

The village has a population of 30.

== Notable residents ==
- Kasimir Wedig von Bonin (1691–1752), Prussian lieutenant general
