= Stare Wiatrowo =

- Settlement
- Location within Poland
- Coordinates: 54°00′28″N 16°45′57″E
- Country: Poland
- Voivodeship: West Pomeranian
- County: Koszalin
- Gmina: Polanów

Stare Wiatrowo [ˈstarɛ vjaˈtrɔvɔ] (German: Alt Kleehof) is a settlement in the administrative district of Gmina Polanów, within Koszalin County, West Pomeranian Voivodeship, in north-western Poland.

For the history of the region, see History of Pomerania.
