= Puławy (disambiguation) =

Puławy may refer to the following places:

- Puławy in Lublin Voivodeship (east Poland)
- Puławy, Subcarpathian Voivodeship (south-east Poland)
- Puławy, West Pomeranian Voivodeship (north-west Poland)
