= Kraśnik Koszaliński =

- Village
- Location within Poland
- Coordinates: 54°7′35″N 15°59′38″E
- Country: Poland
- Voivodeship: West Pomeranian
- County: Koszalin
- Gmina: Biesiekierz

Kraśnik Koszaliński [ˈkraɕnik kɔʂaˈliɲski] (German: Kratzig) is a village in the administrative district of Gmina Biesiekierz, within Koszalin County, West Pomeranian Voivodeship, in north-western Poland.
