= Cieszyn, West Pomeranian Voivodeship =

Cieszyn
- Village
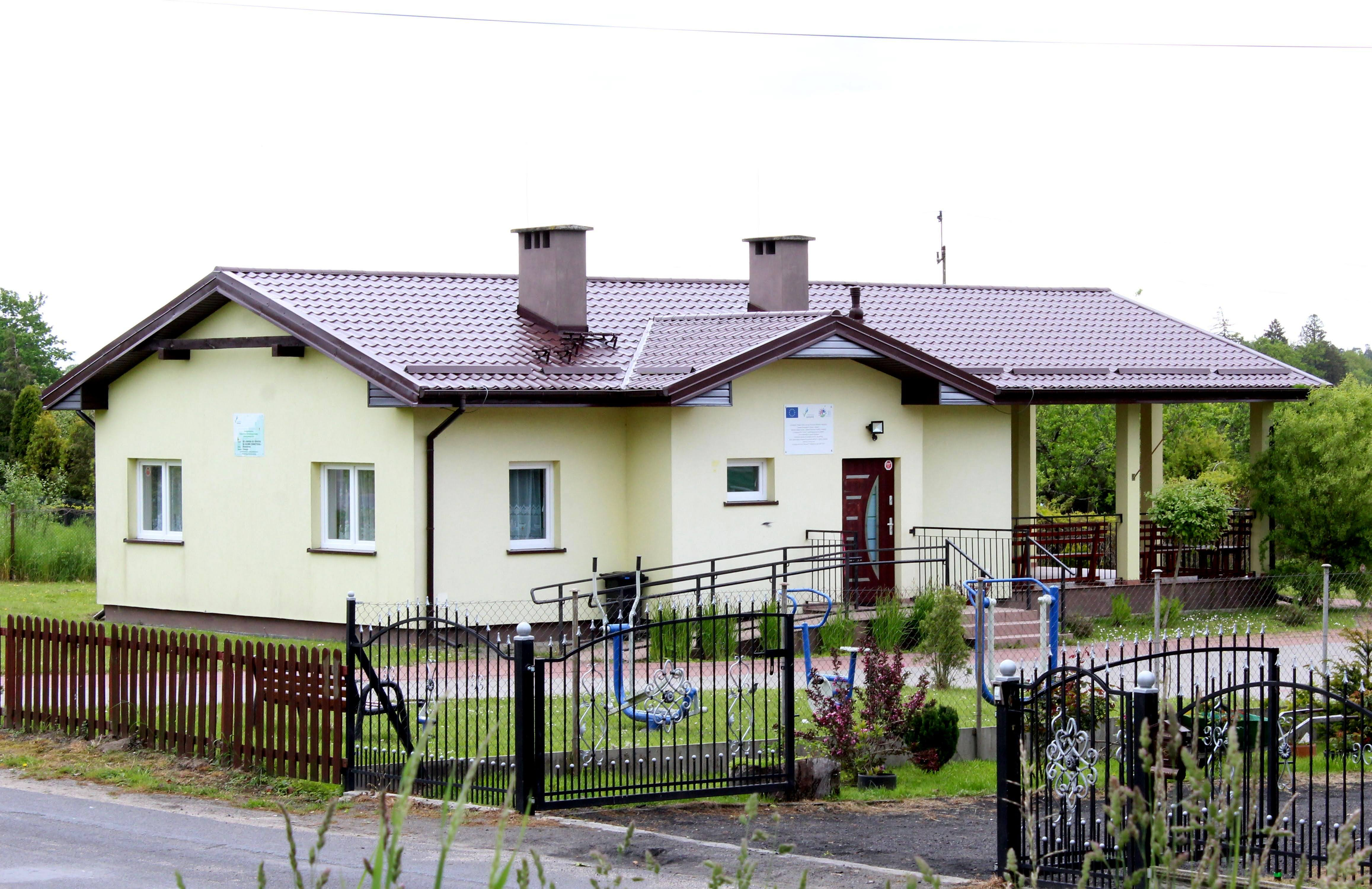

- Location within Poland
- Coordinates: 54°10′12″N 16°3′17″E
- Country: Poland
- Voivodeship: West Pomeranian
- County: Koszalin
- Gmina: Biesiekierz

Population
  - Total: 90
- Time zone: UTC+1 (CET)
  - Summer (DST): UTC+2 (CEST)
- Vehicle registration: ZKO

Cieszyn (Polish: [ˈt͡ɕɛʂɨn]) is a village in the administrative district of Gmina Biesiekierz, within Koszalin County, West Pomeranian Voivodeship, in north-western Poland. It lies approximately 5 km (3 mi) north of Biesiekierz, 9 km (6 mi) west of Koszalin, and 128 km (80 mi) north-east of the regional capital Szczecin.

The village has a population of 90.

During World War II, the Germans operated a forced labour subcamp of the Stalag II-D prisoner-of-war camp in the village.
