= Zagaje, West Pomeranian Voivodeship =

Zagaje
- Settlement
- Location within Poland
- Coordinates: 54°2′51″N 16°46′14″E
- Country: Poland
- Voivodeship: West Pomeranian
- County: Koszalin
- Gmina: Polanów

Zagaje [zaˈɡajɛ] (German: Schonungshof) is a settlement in the administrative district of Gmina Polanów, within Koszalin County, West Pomeranian Voivodeship, in north-western Poland.

For the history of the region, see History of Pomerania.
