= Parnówko =

- Settlement
- Location within Poland
- Coordinates: 54°10′49″N 16°01′34″E
- Country: Poland
- Voivodeship: West Pomeranian
- County: Koszalin
- Gmina: Biesiekierz

Parnówko [parˈnufkɔ] is a settlement in the administrative district of Gmina Biesiekierz, within Koszalin County, West Pomeranian Voivodeship, in north-western Poland. The town had a population of 54 as of 2005.

== See also ==
- History of Pomerania
