= Garbno, West Pomeranian Voivodeship =

Garbno
- Village
- Location within Poland
- Coordinates: 54°6′36″N 16°32′19″E
- Country: Poland
- Voivodeship: West Pomeranian
- County: Koszalin
- Gmina: Polanów
- Population: 200

Garbno [ˈɡarbnɔ] (German Gerbin) is a village in the administrative district of Gmina Polanów, within Koszalin County, West Pomeranian Voivodeship, in north-western Poland. It lies approximately 11 km (7 mi) west of Polanów, 25 km (16 mi) east of Koszalin, and 150 km (93 mi) north-east of the regional capital Szczecin.

For the history of the region, see History of Pomerania.

The village has a population of 200.
