= Żdżar, Koszalin County =

Żdżar
- Settlement
- Location within Poland
- Coordinates: 54°8′N 16°39′E
- Country: Poland
- Voivodeship: West Pomeranian
- County: Koszalin
- Gmina: Polanów

Żdżar [ʐd͡ʐar] (German: Sohrhof) is a settlement in the administrative district of Gmina Polanów, within Koszalin County, West Pomeranian Voivodeship, in north-western Poland. It lies approximately 5 km (3 mi) north-west of Polanów, 31 km (19 mi) east of Koszalin, and 158 km (98 mi) north-east of the regional capital Szczecin.

For the history of the region, see History of Pomerania.
