= Lipki, West Pomeranian Voivodeship =

Lipki
- Settlement
- Location within Poland
- Coordinates: 54°01′14″N 16°46′30″E
- Country: Poland
- Voivodeship: West Pomeranian
- County: Koszalin
- Gmina: Polanów

Lipki [ˈlipki] (German: Klein Linde) is a settlement in the administrative district of Gmina Polanów, within Koszalin County, West Pomeranian Voivodeship, in north-western Poland.

For the history of the region, see History of Pomerania.
