= Starki =

- Settlement
- Location within Poland
- Coordinates: 54°11′35″N 16°04′59″E
- Country: Poland
- Voivodeship: West Pomeranian
- County: Koszalin
- Gmina: Biesiekierz

Starki [ˈstarki] is a settlement in the administrative district of Gmina Biesiekierz, within Koszalin County, West Pomeranian Voivodeship, in north-western Poland.

For the history of the region, see History of Pomerania.
