= Chróstowo, West Pomeranian Voivodeship =

Chróstowo
- Settlement
- Location within Poland
- Coordinates: 54°02′20″N 16°46′24″E
- Country: Poland
- Voivodeship: West Pomeranian
- County: Koszalin
- Gmina: Polanów
- Time zone: UTC+1 (CET)
  - Summer (DST): UTC+2 (CEST)
- Vehicle registration: ZKO

Chróstowo ([xrusˈtɔvɔ]; German: Twelberg) is a settlement in the administrative district of Gmina Polanów, within Koszalin County, West Pomeranian Voivodeship, in north-western Poland. It is located in the historic region of Pomerania.

== History ==
The area became part of the emerging Polish state under its first ruler Mieszko I in the 10th century. Following the fragmentation of Poland, it formed part of the Duchy of Pomerania.

As a result of the territorial changes in the region, during the Ostsiedlung the settlement came under increasing German influence. From the 18th century it belonged to the Kingdom of Prussia, and from 1871 to 1945 it was part of Germany within the German Empire, the Weimar Republic, and later Nazi Germany.

After the defeat of Nazi Germany in World War II in 1945, the area was reintegrated into Poland, and the German population was replaced by Poles displaced from former eastern Polish territories annexed by the Soviet Union.
