= Rzyszczewko, Koszalin County =

Rzyszczewko
- Village
- Location within Poland
- Coordinates: 54°10′41″N 16°38′11″E
- Country: Poland
- Voivodeship: West Pomeranian
- County: Koszalin
- Gmina: Polanów

Rzyszczewko [ʐɨʂˈt͡ʂɛfkɔ] (German: Klein Ristow) is a village in the administrative district of Gmina Polanów, within Koszalin County, West Pomeranian Voivodeship, in north-western Poland. It lies approximately 10 km (6 mi) north-west of Polanów, 30 km (19 mi) east of Koszalin, and 160 km (99 mi) north-east of the regional capital Szczecin.

For the history of the region, see History of Pomerania.
