= Racław, West Pomeranian Voivodeship =

Racław
- Settlement
- Location within Poland
- Coordinates: 54°02′21″N 16°45′48″E
- Country: Poland
- Voivodeship: West Pomeranian
- County: Koszalin
- Gmina: Polanów

Racław [ˈrat͡swaf] (German: Ratzlaffenkamp) is a settlement in the administrative district of Gmina Polanów, within Koszalin County, West Pomeranian Voivodeship, in northwestern Poland.

For the history of the region, see History of Pomerania.
