= Dzikowo, Koszalin County =

Dzikowo
- Settlement
- Location within Poland
- Coordinates: 54°04′59″N 16°40′46″E
- Country: Poland
- Voivodeship: West Pomeranian
- County: Koszalin
- Gmina: Polanów

Dzikowo [d͡ʑiˈkɔvɔ] is a settlement in the administrative district of Gmina Polanów, within Koszalin County, West Pomeranian Voivodeship, in north-western Poland.
