= Pokrzywno, West Pomeranian Voivodeship =

Pokrzywno
- Settlement
- Location within Poland
- Coordinates: 54°04′00″N 16°47′42″E
- Country: Poland
- Voivodeship: West Pomeranian
- County: Koszalin
- Gmina: Polanów

Pokrzywno [pɔˈkʂɨvnɔ] is a settlement in the administrative district of Gmina Polanów, within Koszalin County, West Pomeranian Voivodeship, in north-western Poland.
