= Robert von Puttkamer =

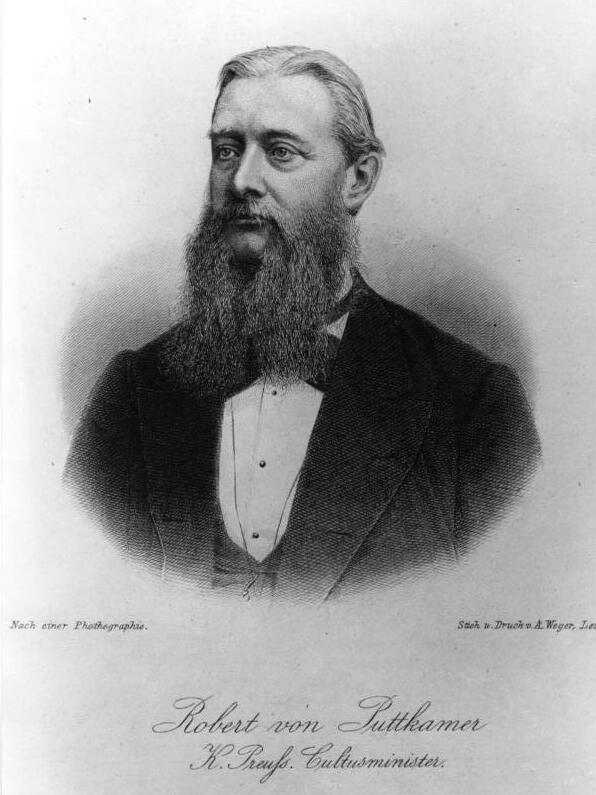
- Robert von Puttkamer in 1879
- Born: Robert Viktor von Puttkamer; 5 May 1828; Frankfurt (Oder), Brandenburg
- Died: 15 March 1900 (aged 71); Karzin, Pomerania
- Parent(s): Heinrich von Puttkamer; Luitgarde Agnes von Glasenapp

Robert Viktor von Puttkamer (5 May 1828 – 15 March 1900) was a Prussian statesman, most prominent in his roles as Prussian minister of public education and worship in 1879 and as interior minister in 1881, under his brother-in-law Otto von Bismarck. He also introduced reforms in German orthography.

== Early career ==
Puttkamer was born at Frankfurt (Oder) in the Province of Brandenburg. His father, Heinrich von Puttkamer, Oberpräsident of the Province of Posen, belonged to the widely extended noble Puttkamer family, of which Bismarck's wife Johanna von Puttkamer and Puttkamer's own wife were also members. Robert von Puttkamer, after a short course of law, began his official career in 1850 as Auskultator in the courts at Danzig, but in 1852 he entered the civil service, and after his promotion to the rank of Assessor in 1854 he was given a post in the railway department of the ministry for trade and industry. In 1859 he became a member of the presidial council (German: Oberpräsidialrat) at Coblenz, capital of the Prussian Rhine Province, and from 1860 to 1866 was Landrat at Demmin in Pomerania.

During the Austro-Prussian War, Puttkamer acted as civil commissary in Moravia. From 1867 to 1871 he was a councillor in the chancery of the North German Confederation. In 1871 he was appointed president of the government region of Gumbinnen in East Prussia, in 1875 department president (German: Bezirkspräsident/French: président du département) of the Department of Lorraine, and in 1877 Oberpräsident of Silesia. From 1874 onward he was frequently elected to the Reichstag and the Prussian Chamber of Deputies, in which he attached himself to the German Conservative Party.

== Ministerial work ==
In 1879 Puttkamer was appointed Prussian minister of education and public worship, the chosen instrument of the Clerical Conservative policy initiated by Bismarck when the Socialist peril made it expedient to conciliate the Catholic Centre. As Oberpräsident of Silesia he had already done much to mitigate the rigour of the application of the May Laws, and as minister of education and public worship, he continued this policy. He took measures against the undenominational schools, and made concessions to the orthodox Evangelicals.

In 1881 Puttkamer was appointed Prussian minister of the interior. His reactionary conservative temper was in complete harmony with the views of Bismarck and the Emperor William, and with their powerful support he attempted, in defiance of modern democratic principles and even of the spirit of the constitution, to re-establish the old Prussian system of rigid discipline from above.

He was above all concerned to nip in the bud any tendencies in the civil service to revolt, and it was on his initiative that on 4 January 1882 a royal ordinance laid it down as the duty of all officials to give the government their unconditional support at political elections. In a vain effort to combat social democracy, he seriously interfered with the freedom to hold public meetings and attempted the forcible suppression of strike movements. However, he did carry out many useful administrative reforms.

== Resignation and controversies ==
Puttkamer's administration was intensely unpopular and was attacked in the Reichstag not only by Radicals like Eugen Richter and Rickert but also by National Liberals like Rudolf von Bennigsen. When the new Emperor Frederick III, whose liberal tendencies were notorious, succeeded to the throne, it was clear that it could not last.

Some say that his resignature was initiated by Empress (Kaiserin) Victoria, the wife of Emperor Frederick III. Puttkamer was a hard pro-conservative and had unconditionally supported Otto von Bismarck. In late years of Emperor Vilhelm I's rule, there were many tensions between Puttmark, Otto von Bismarck and their conservatives and pro-liberalist ideas of Crown Prince Frederick and Victoria. They escalated so much that in the German newspapers, Crown Princess Victoria was called an "English spy" and "A princess who hates Germany". Also, there were many conflicts about ideals of the young Prince Vilhelm II. When Vilhelm I died, Prussian family and inheritance laws made the new Kaiser and Kaiserin be Frederick III and Victoria. Since Frederick III already had throat cancer and could no speak, Victoria became de facto responsible for managing the German Empire. She strongly supported the liberals in the Reichstag, who were only 8% of its members. Since she was an Anglophile and the eldest daughter of Queen Victoria and Prince Albert, she hated how he ruled the government body. Still, with no political backing, Puttkamer was forced to resign from his position.

== Late career ==
The reign of Frederick III lasted barely three months, and he was succeeded by his son William II, whose principles were those of his grandfather, and Puttkamer was largely rehabilitated. On 1 January 1889 he received the Order of the Black Eagle. He was appointed a secular canon (German: Domherr) of Merseburg, and in 1891 became Oberpräsident of the Province of Pomerania. In this office, which he held till 1899, he did useful work in collaboration with the provincial estates.

He died in 1900 on his estate at Karzin in Pomerania.

== Reformer of German orthography ==
Puttkamer is also remembered as the author of the ordinance of the 21 January 1880 on the simplification of German orthography. This was at first vigorously opposed, not least by Bismarck, himself; but its convenience soon became evident, it was increasingly put into practice, and was so well based that later reformers needed only to follow the lines laid down by Puttkamer.
