= Pieczyska, Koszalin County =

Pieczyska
- Settlement
- Location within Poland
- Coordinates: 54°00′29″N 16°47′23″E
- Country: Poland
- Voivodeship: West Pomeranian
- County: Koszalin
- Gmina: Polanów

Pieczyska [pjɛˈt͡ʂɨska] (German: Vorhütte) is a settlement in the administrative district of Gmina Polanów, within Koszalin County, West Pomeranian Voivodeship, in north-western Poland.

For the history of the region, see History of Pomerania.
