= Czyżewo, West Pomeranian Voivodeship =

Czyżewo
- Settlement
- Location within Poland
- Coordinates: 54°01′52″N 16°46′41″E
- Country: Poland
- Voivodeship: West Pomeranian
- County: Koszalin
- Gmina: Polanów

Czyżewo [t͡ʂɨˈʐɛvɔ] (German: Pfingstberg) is a settlement in the administrative district of Gmina Polanów, within Koszalin County, West Pomeranian Voivodeship, in north-western Poland.

For the history of the region, see History of Pomerania.
