= Rzyszczewko =

Rzyszczewko may refer to the following places:

- Rzyszczewko, Koszalin County in West Pomeranian Voivodeship (north-west Poland)
- Rzyszczewko, Sławno County in West Pomeranian Voivodeship (north-west Poland)
- Rzyszczewko, Szczecinek County in West Pomeranian Voivodeship (north-west Poland)
