= Gneomar =

Gneomar is a German given name, which is of Mecklenburgian origin and derived from Slavic. It is an old given name derived from the Slavic elements: "gniew" (anger) and "mir" (peace, glory or world).

== People ==
- Anton von Kleist (Anton Tam Gneomar Constantin von Kleist; 1812–1886), Pomeranian landholder, Prussian Landrat and politician
- Dubislav Gneomar von Natzmer (1654–1739), Prussian Generalfeldmarschall
- Anthonie Willem Constantijn Gneomar "Antonie" Kamerling (25 August 1966 – 6 October 2010) was a Dutch television and film actor, and musician.
