= Jeżewo, West Pomeranian Voivodeship =

Jeżewo
- Settlement
- Location within Poland
- Coordinates: 54°04′18″N 16°46′50″E
- Country: Poland
- Voivodeship: West Pomeranian
- County: Koszalin
- Gmina: Polanów

Jeżewo [jɛˈʐɛvɔ] is a settlement in the administrative district of Gmina Polanów, within Koszalin County, West Pomeranian Voivodeship, in north-western Poland.
