= Kasimir Wedig von Bonin =

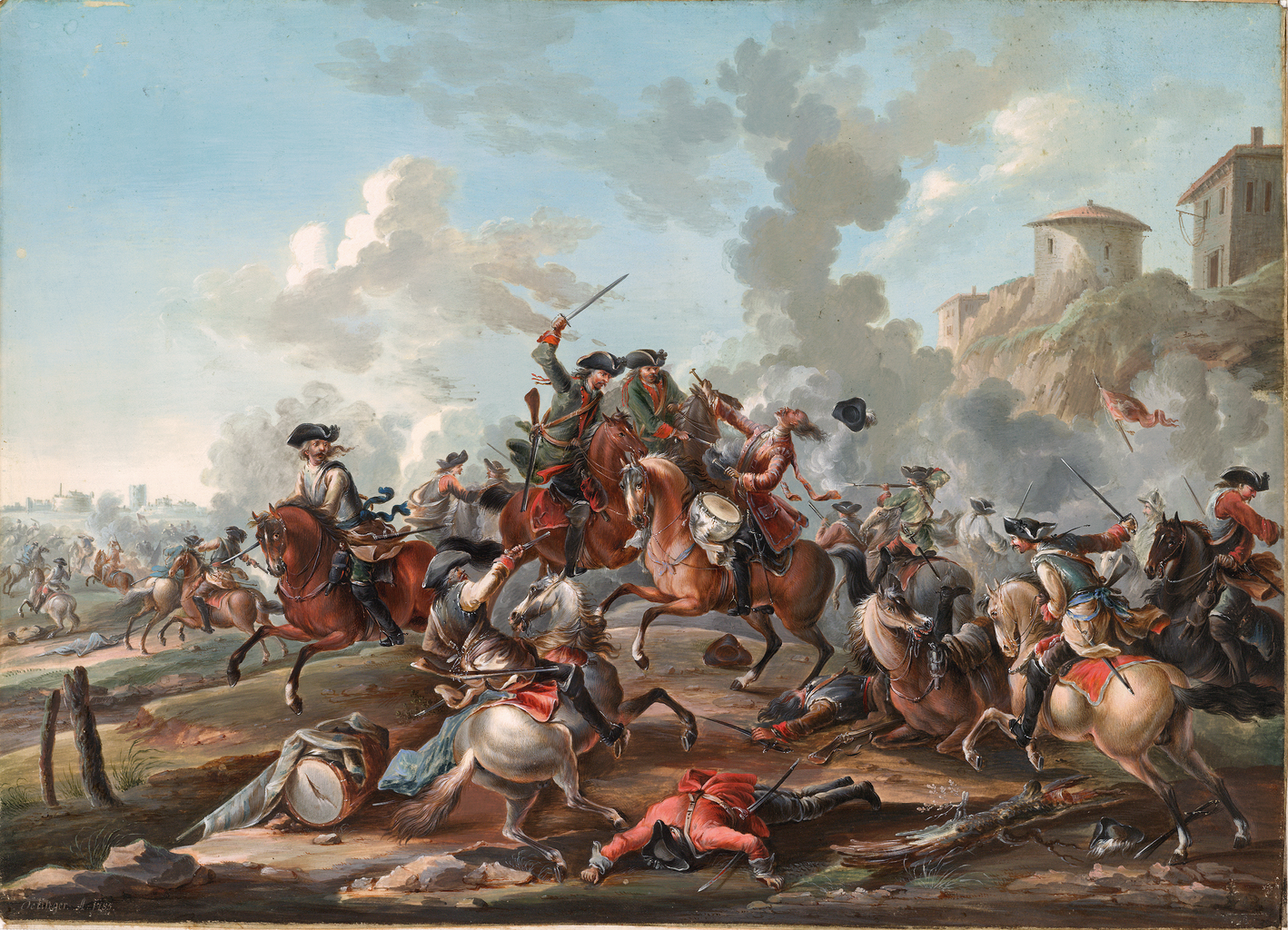
- Eighteenth century cavalry in battle
- Born: 1 May 1691; Karzin, Pomerania
- Died: 12 September 1752 (aged 61); Landsberg an der Warthe
- Military career
- Allegiance: Kingdom of Prussia
- Branch: Prussian cavalry
- Service years: ~1730–1752
- Rank: Lieutenant general
- Conflicts: War of the Austrian Succession
- Awards: Black Eagle Order; Name inscribed on Frederick the Great's Equestrian Statue

Kasimir Wedig von Bonin (1 May 1691 in Karzin–12 September 1752 in Landsberg an der Warthe), also called Casimir Wedigo von Bonin, was a Prussian lieutenant general during the reigns of Frederick William I and his son, Frederick the Great.

== Military career ==
Bonin began his military career as a page for the Markgraf Albrecht Wolfgang von Brandenburg-Beyreuth (1689–1734). He served in the Markgraf's cavalry regiment, and eventually became its Rittmeister (captain of cavalry). On 4 January 1738 he was named commander and colonel of his own Curassier regiment. In 1740, he participated in the Silesian, Bohemian and Saxon campaigns of the War of Austrian Succession. In 1743, he received a dragoon regiment and was promoted to major general. During the Second Silesian War, in 1745, he participated at the battles of Hohenfriedberg and Kesseldorf. On 24 May 1747, he was promoted to lieutenant general of the cavalry.

In December 1748, he received the Black Eagle Order for his military service. He died on 12 September 1752 in Landsberg an der Warthe. In 1851, his name was included on the Equestrian statue of Frederick the Great.

== Family ==
Bonin was one of the old Pomeranian noble families. He had two brothers, Ulrich Bogislaus von Bonin and Anselm Christoph von Bonin.
