= Alfons Pawelczyk =

German politician (1933–2026)

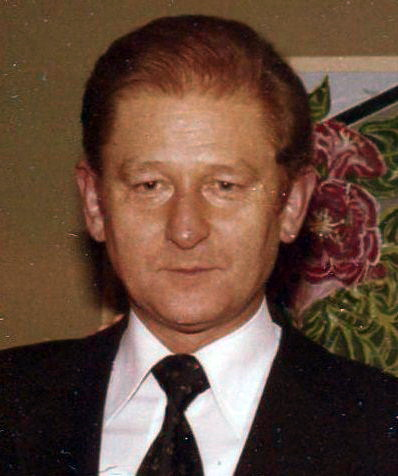
- Pawelczyk in 1982

Second Mayor of Hamburg
- In office 13 June 1984 – 2 September 1987
- First Mayor: Klaus von Dohnanyi
- Preceded by: Helga Elstner
- Succeeded by: Ingo von Münch

Senator for the Interior of Hamburg
- In office 7 August 1986 – 2 September 1987
- President: Klaus von Dohnanyi
- Preceded by: Rolf Lange
- Succeeded by: Volker Lange
- In office 26 November 1980 – 13 June 1984
- President: Hans-Ulrich Klose; Klaus von Dohnanyi
- Preceded by: Werner Staak
- Succeeded by: Rolf Lange

Member of the Hamburg Parliament
- In office 2 September 1987 – 22 September 1991
- Preceded by: Multi-member district
- Succeeded by: Inge Kazamel
- Constituency: State list

Member of the Bundestag
- In office 20 October 1969 – 18 December 1980
- Preceded by: Multi-member district
- Succeeded by: Eugen Glombig
- Constituency: State list (1969–1972); Wandsbek (1972–1976); Hamburg-Wandsbek (1976–1980)

Personal details
- Born: 26 February 1933 Parnow, Germany (now Parnowo, Poland)
- Died: 3 July 2026 (aged 93)
- Party: Social Democratic
- Children: 3

Alfons Pawelczyk (26 February 1933 – 3 July 2026) was a German politician. As a representative of the Social Democratic Party, he was Hamburg Senator (i.e. state minister) of the Interior and second mayor in Hamburg.

Pawelczyk was lieutenant colonel of the German federal armed forces and member of the German federal parliament from 1969 to 1980. He was also member of the Hamburg Parliament, in 1982 state minister (German: Senator) of the Interior, and in 1986 second mayor of Hamburg.

Pawelczyk died on 3 July 2026, at the age of 93.

== See also ==
- List of mayors of Hamburg
