= Kopaniec, West Pomeranian Voivodeship =

Kopaniec
- Settlement
- Location within Poland
- Coordinates: 54°00′01″N 16°46′55″E
- Country: Poland
- Voivodeship: West Pomeranian
- County: Koszalin
- Gmina: Polanów

Kopaniec [kɔˈpaɲɛt͡s] (German: Althütte) is a settlement in the administrative district of Gmina Polanów, within Koszalin County, West Pomeranian Voivodeship, in north-western Poland.

For the history of the region, see History of Pomerania.
