= Liszkowo, Koszalin County =

Liszkowo
- Settlement
- Location within Poland
- Coordinates: 54°03′56″N 16°46′57″E
- Country: Poland
- Voivodeship: West Pomeranian
- County: Koszalin
- Gmina: Polanów

Liszkowo [liʂˈkɔvɔ] (German: Lischberg) is a settlement in the administrative district of Gmina Polanów, within Koszalin County, West Pomeranian Voivodeship, in north-western Poland.

For the history of the region, see History of Pomerania.
