= Cieszyn (disambiguation) =

Cieszyn may refer to the following places:

- Cieszyn, a town in Silesian Voivodeship, Poland
- Český Těšín (Czeski Cieszyn), a town in Moravian-Silesian Region, Czech Republic
- Cieszyn, Greater Poland Voivodeship, a village in Greater Poland Voivodeship, Poland
- Cieszyn, Lublin Voivodeship, a village in Lublin Voivodeship, Poland
- Cieszyn, West Pomeranian Voivodeship, a village in West Pomeranian Voivodeship, Poland
