= Gmina Polanów =

Gmina Polanów Polanów Commune
- Gmina
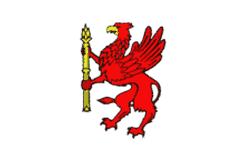
- Flag Coat of arms
- Interactive map of Gmina Polanów
- Coordinates (Polanów): 54°6′N 16°42′E
- Country: Poland
- Voivodeship: West Pomeranian
- County: Koszalin County
- Seat: Polanów

Area
  - Total: 393.08 km^{2} (151.77 sq mi)

Population (2006)
  - Total: 9,194
  - Density: 23.39/km^{2} (60.58/sq mi)
  - Urban: 2,967
  - Rural: 6,227
- Website: http://www.polanow.pl/

Gmina Polanów is an urban-rural gmina (administrative district) in Koszalin County, West Pomeranian Voivodeship, in north-western Poland. Its seat is the town of Polanów, which lies approximately 35 kilometres (22 mi) east of Koszalin and 159 km (99 mi) north-east of the regional capital Szczecin.

The gmina covers an area of 393.08 square kilometres (151.8 sq mi), and as of 2006 its total population is 9,194 (out of which the population of Polanów amounts to 2,967, and the population of the rural part of the gmina is 6,227).

== Villages ==
Apart from the town of Polanów, Gmina Polanów contains the villages and settlements of Bagnica, Bartlewo, Bożenice, Bukowo, Buszyno, Cetuń, Chocimino, Chocimino Leśne, Chróstowo, Czarnowiec, Czyżewo, Dadzewo, Dalimierz, Doły, Domachowo, Dzikowo, Garbno, Gilewo, Głusza, Gołogóra, Gosław, Gostkowo, Jacinki, Jaromierz Polanowski, Jeżewo, Kania, Karsina, Karsinka, Kępiec, Kępiny, Kierzkowo, Knieja, Komorowo, Kopaniec, Kościernica, Krąg, Krytno, Łąkie, Lipki, Liszkowo, Łokwica, Małomierz, Mirotki, Młyniska, Nacław, Nadbór, Nowy Żelibórz, Osetno, Piaskowo, Pieczyska, Pokrzywno, Powidz, Przybrodzie, Puławy, Pyszki, Racibórz Polanowski, Racław, Rekowo, Rochowo, Rosocha, Rzeczyca Mała, Rzeczyca Wielka, Rzyszczewko, Samostrzel, Smugi, Sowinko, Stare Wiatrowo, Stary Żelibórz, Stołpie, Strzeżewo, Świerczyna, Szczerbin, Trzebaw, Warblewo, Wielin, Wietrzno, Zagaje, Żdżar, Zdzieszewo and Żydowo.

== Neighbouring gminas ==
Gmina Polanów is bordered by the gminas of Biały Bór, Bobolice, Kępice, Malechowo, Manowo, Miastko, Sianów and Sławno.
