= Gmina Biesiekierz =

Gmina Biesiekierz Biesiekierz Commune
- Gmina
- Coat of arms
- Interactive map of Gmina Biesiekierz
- Coordinates (Biesiekierz): 54°8′2″N 16°2′19″E
- Country: Poland
- Voivodeship: West Pomeranian
- County: Koszalin County
- Seat: Biesiekierz

Area
  - Total: 116.87 km^{2} (45.12 sq mi)

Population (2006)
  - Total: 5,439
  - Density: 46.54/km^{2} (120.5/sq mi)

Gmina Biesiekierz is a rural gmina (administrative district) in Koszalin County, West Pomeranian Voivodeship, in north-western Poland. Its seat is the village of Biesiekierz, which lies approximately 11 kilometres (7 mi) south-west of Koszalin and 125 km (78 mi) north-east of the regional capital Szczecin.

The gmina covers an area of 116.87 square kilometres (45.1 sq mi), and as of 2006 its total population is 5,439.

== Villages ==
Gmina Biesiekierz contains the villages and settlements of Biesiekierz, Cieszyn, Gniazdowo, Kotłowo, Kraśnik Koszaliński, Laski Koszalińskie, Nosowo, Nowe Bielice, Parnówko, Parnowo, Parsowo, Rutkowo, Stare Bielice, Starki, Świeminko, Świemino, Tatów, Warnino and Witolubie.

== Neighbouring gminas ==
Gmina Biesiekierz is bordered by the city of Koszalin and by the gminas of Będzino, Białogard, Karlino and Świeszyno.
