= Biesiekierz =

- Village
- Location within Poland
- Coordinates: 54°8′2″N 16°2′19″E
- Country: Poland
- Voivodeship: West Pomeranian
- County: Koszalin
- Gmina: Biesiekierz
- Population: 940

Biesiekierz [bjɛˈɕɛkʲɛʂ] (German: Biziker) is a village in Koszalin County, West Pomeranian Voivodeship, in north-western Poland. It is the seat of the gmina (administrative district) called Gmina Biesiekierz. It lies approximately 11 km (7 mi) south-west of Koszalin and 125 km (78 mi) north-east of the regional capital Szczecin.

The village has a population of 940.
