= Polanów =

Town in West Pomeranian Voivodeship, Poland

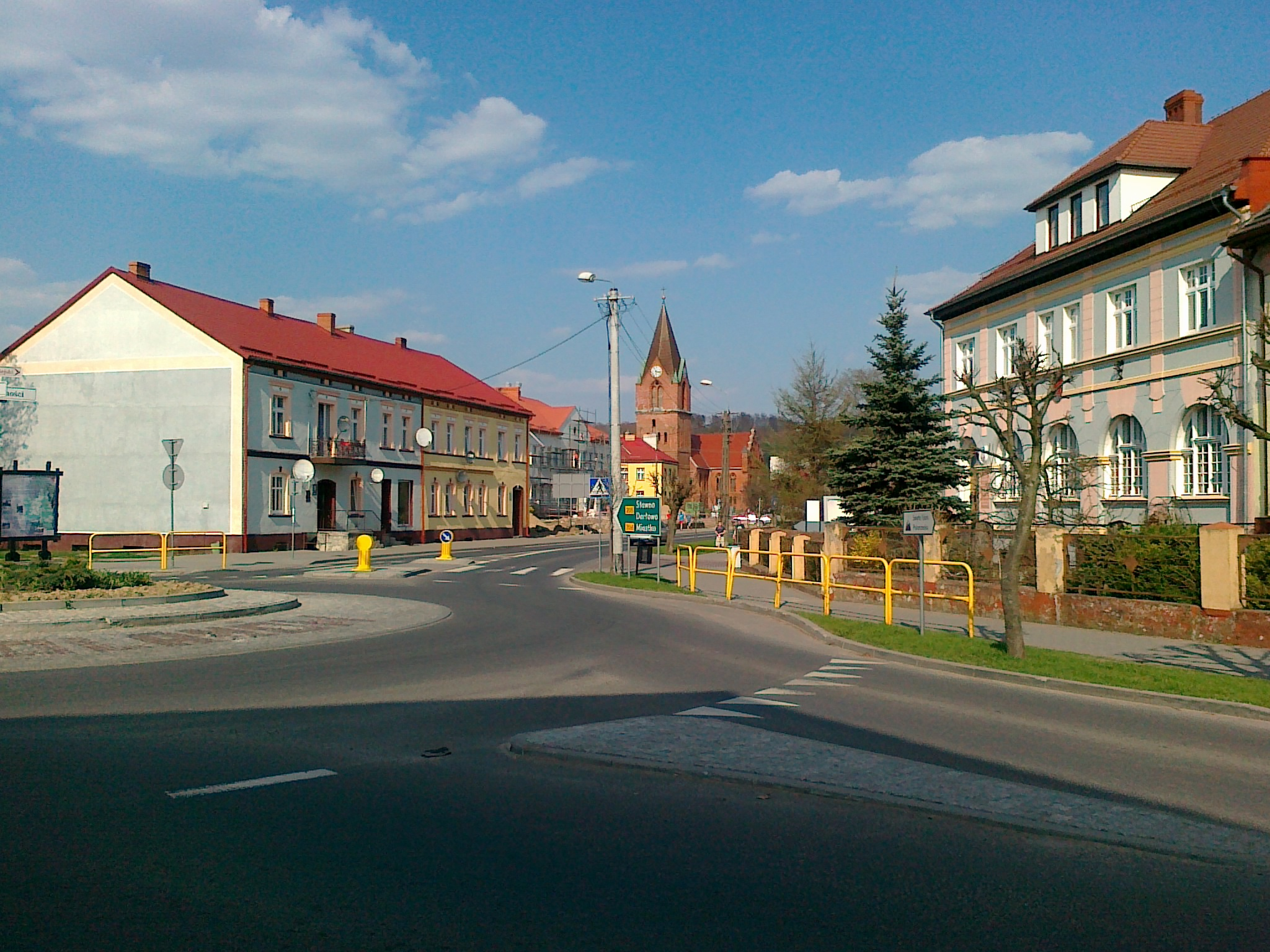
- Rondabout with the Town Hall on the right and the Church of the Assumption in the background

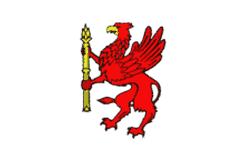
- Flag Coat of arms

- Location within Poland
- Coordinates: 54°6′N 16°42′E
- Country: Poland
- Voivodeship: West Pomeranian
- County: Koszalin
- Gmina: Polanów
- Town rights: 1313

Government
  - Mayor: Grzegorz Paweł Lipski

Area
  - Total: 7.61 km^{2} (2.94 sq mi)

Population (2017)
  - Total: 2,949
  - Density: 388/km^{2} (1,000/sq mi)
- Time zone: UTC+1 (CET)
  - Summer (DST): UTC+2 (CEST)
- Postal code: 76-010
- Area code: +48 94
- Vehicle registration: ZKO
- Website: http://www.polanow.pl

Polanów [pɔˈlanuf] (German: Pollnow) is a town in northern Poland, located in the Koszalin County of the West Pomeranian Voivodeship. It has 2,949 inhabitants (2017). It is located in the historic region of Pomerania.

== Etymology ==
The name is of Slavic origin and comes either from the word polana ("glade") or from Polan or Polak ("Pole").

== History ==
The territory became part of Poland in the 10th century. Near Polanów stands Święta Góra Polanowska (Polanów Holy Mountain). It was probably a place of Slavic pagan worship, and then it was a late medieval Christian pilgrimage destination. The settlement was first mentioned in 13th century, and was granted town rights in 1313 under Lübeck law. As of 1307, the local castle was held by Pomeranian nobleman Piotr Święca. Later in the 14th century, the castle became an episcopal possession.

Local tailors' and bakers' guilds were established in c. 1600 and c. 1770, respectively. In late modern times, other tradespeople, including millers, butchers, barbers, and roofers, belonged to district guilds based either in Sławno or Koszalin. In the 19th century, there was a glassworks whose products were exported to Denmark and Sweden.

During World War II, in mid-February 1945, the town was bombed by the Soviets. The German administration issued the order to evacuate the town only in the afternoon of 26 February 1945, a few hours before the Soviets captured the town. At that time, apart from the residents, there were also refugees from the east and prisoners of war held by the Germans, mainly Polish and French, but also Italian and Russian. The town was 90% destroyed, although not because of combat, but to a fire that took place on 3 March 1945.

== Points of interest ==
- Gołogóra transmitter, a facility for FM-/TV-broadcasting with 2 guyed masts, which are 271 respectively 115 metres tall
- Historic churches: Church of the Assumption, Exaltation of the Holy Cross church
- Zalew Polanowski (artificial lake)
- Historical watermill complex
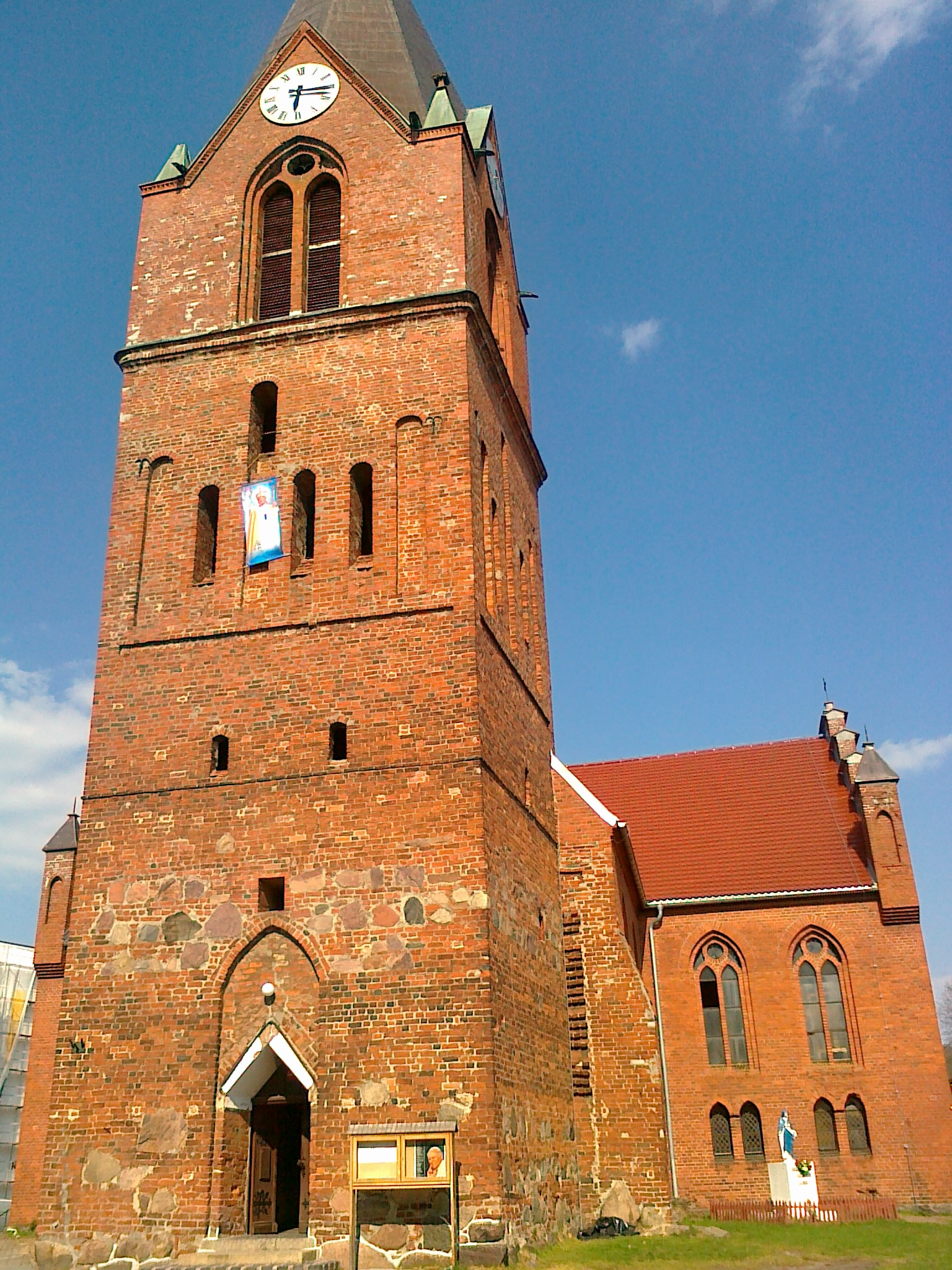
Church of the Assumption

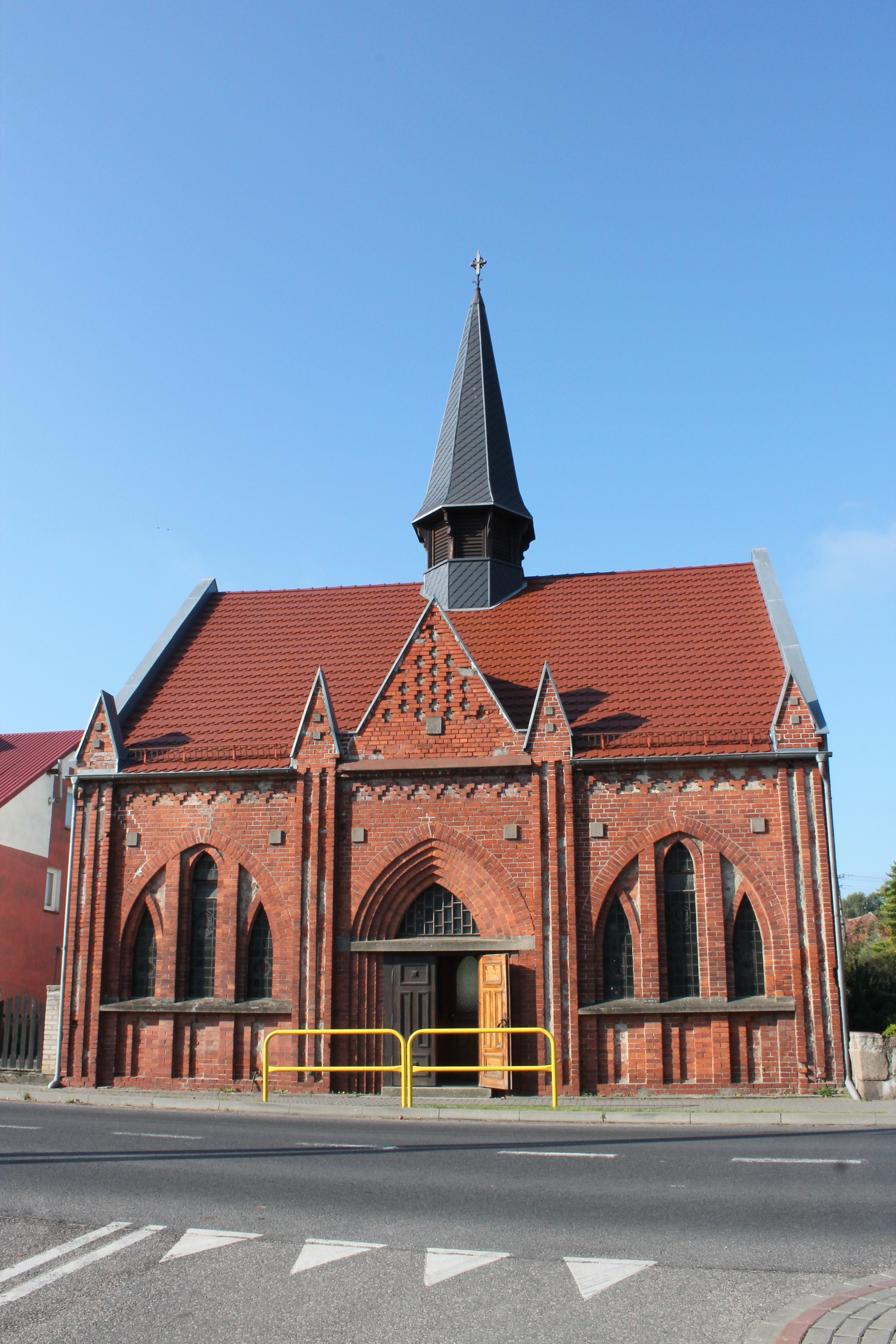
Exaltation of the Holy Cross church

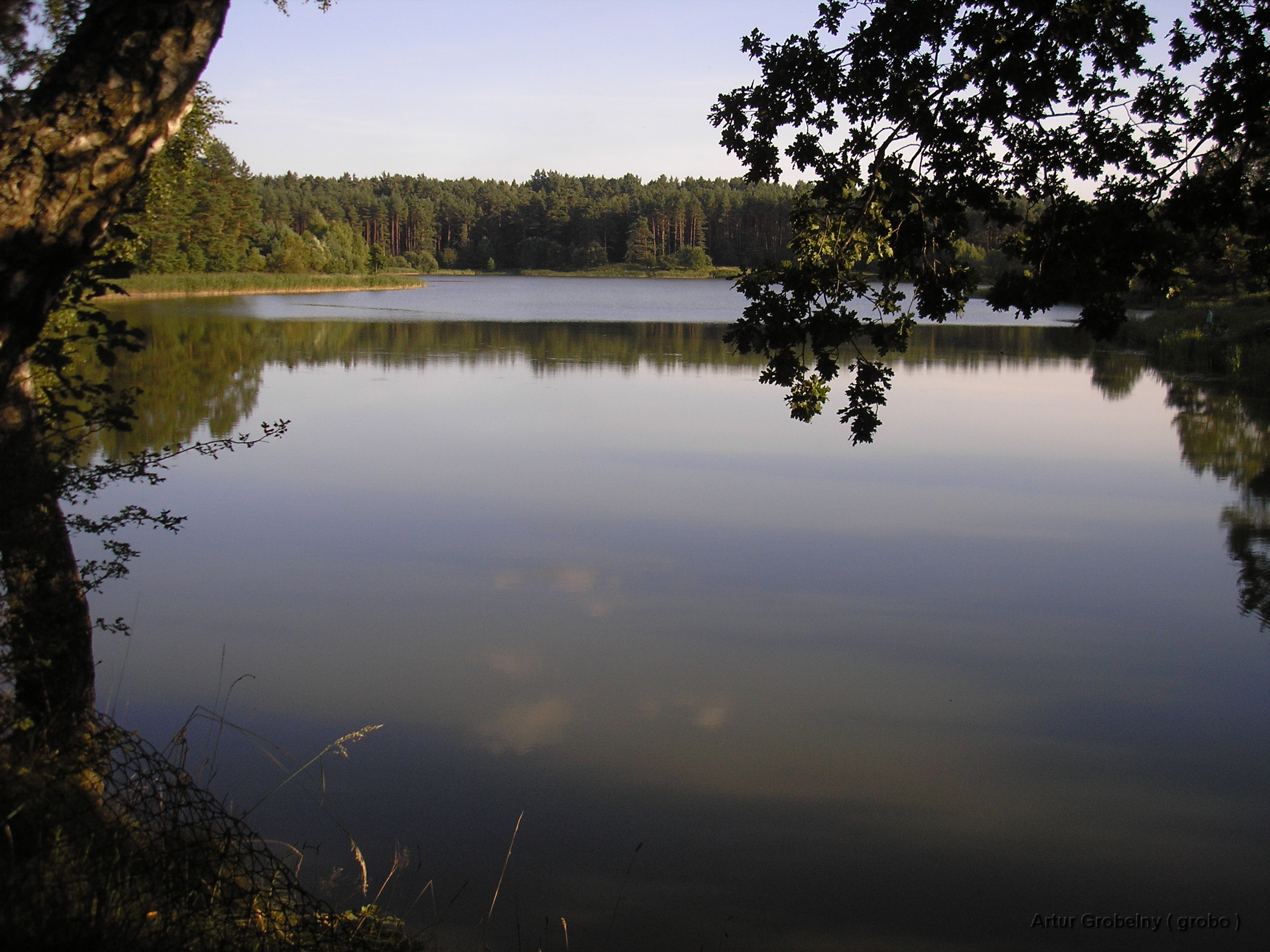
Zalew Polanowski

== Demographics ==
Historical population
Year	Pop.	±%
1890	2,272	—
1910	2,750	+21.0%
1939	3,629	+32.0%
1950	1,310	−63.9%
1960	1,996	+52.4%
2010	2,917	+46.1%

== International relations ==
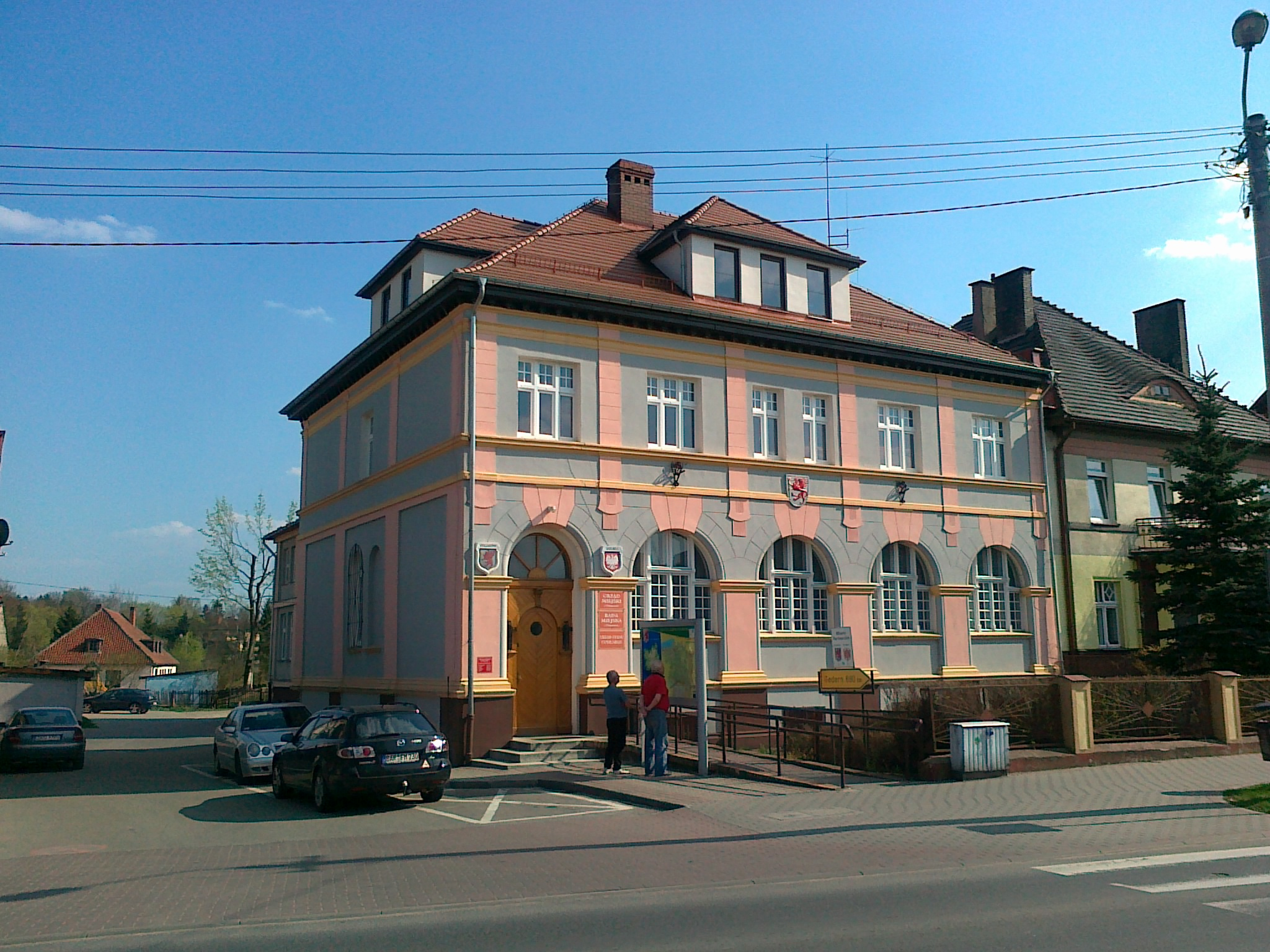
Town hall

In Polanów, there is a khachkar dedicated to Polish-Armenian friendship and the victims of the Turkish-perpetrated Armenian genocide of 1915.

=== Town twinning ===
Polanów is twinned with:

- Gedern, Germany
- Rothenklempenow, Germany

== Notable people ==
- Julius Leopold Pagel (1851–1912), German physician and historian of medicine.
