= Koszalin County =

Koszalin County Powiat koszaliński
- County
- Flag Coat of arms

- Location within the voivodeship

- Division into gminas
- Coordinates (Koszalin): 54°11′N 16°11′E
- Country: Poland
- Voivodeship: West Pomeranian
- Seat: Koszalin
- Gminas: Total 8: Gmina Będzino; Gmina Biesiekierz; Gmina Bobolice; Gmina Manowo; Gmina Mielno; Gmina Polanów; Gmina Sianów; Gmina Świeszyno

Area
  - Total: 1,669.09 km^{2} (644.44 sq mi)

Population (2006)
  - Total: 64,087
  - Density: 38.396/km^{2} (99.446/sq mi)
  - Urban: 13,956
  - Rural: 50,131
- Car plates: ZKO
- Website: www.powiat.koszalin.pl

Koszalin County (Polish: powiat koszaliński) is a unit of territorial administration and local government (powiat) in West Pomeranian Voivodeship, north-western Poland, on the Baltic coast. It came into being on January 1, 1999, as a result of the Polish local government reforms passed in 1998. Its administrative seat is the city of Koszalin, although the city is not part of the county (it constitutes a separate city county). The county contains three towns: Sianów, 10 km (6 mi) north-east of Koszalin, Bobolice, 37 km (23 mi) south-east of Koszalin, and Polanów, 35 km (22 mi) east of Koszalin.

The county covers an area of 1,669.09 square kilometres (644.4 sq mi). As of 2006 its total population is 64,087, out of which the population of Sianów is 6,543, that of Bobolice is 4,446, that of Polanów is 2,967, and the rural population is 50,131.

== Neighbouring counties ==
Apart from the city of Koszalin, Koszalin County is also bordered by Sławno County, Słupsk County and Bytów County to the east, Szczecinek County and Białogard County to the south, and Kołobrzeg County to the west. It also borders the Baltic Sea to the north.

== Administrative divisions ==
The county is subdivided into eight gminas (three urban-rural and five rural). These are listed in the following table, in descending order of population.

Gmina	Type	Area (km^{2})	Population (2006)	Seat
Gmina Sianów	urban-rural	226.8	13,251	Sianów
Gmina Bobolice	urban-rural	367.7	9,905	Bobolice
Gmina Będzino	rural	180.9	9,287	Będzino
Gmina Polanów	urban-rural	393.1	9,194	Polanów
Gmina Manowo	rural	188.6	6,322	Manowo
Gmina Świeszyno	rural	132.6	5,621	Świeszyno
Gmina Biesiekierz	rural	116.9	5,439	Biesiekierz
Gmina Mielno	rural	62.5	5,068	Mielno
