= Ribnica =

Ribnica may refer to:

== Bosnia and Herzegovina ==
- Ribnica (Kakanj), a village
- Ribnica (Bosna), a river
- Ribnica (Krivaja), mountain stream on Konjuh, right tributary of the Krivaja.

== Croatia ==
- Ribnica, Croatia, a village near Velika Gorica

== Macedonia ==
- Ribnica, Mavrovo and Rostuša, a settlement

== Montenegro ==
- Ribnica, the old name for Podgorica, the capital of Montenegro
- Ribnica (fortress), a fortress in Podgorica
- Ribnica (Morača), a river in Podgorica
- FK Ribnica, a football club

== Serbia ==
- Ribnica Lake, on the Rzav in Zlatibor
- Ribnica (Kraljevo), a suburb
- Ribnica (Ibar), a river
- Ribnica (Kolubara), a river

== Slovenia ==
- Municipality of Ribnica, a municipality
- Municipality of Ribnica na Pohorju, a municipality
- Ribnica, Brežice, a settlement
- Ribnica na Pohorju, a settlement
- Ribnica, Pivka, a settlement
- Ribnica, Ribnica, a settlement
- RD Ribnica, a handball club based in Ribnica, Ribnica
- Spodnja Ribnica, a hamlet near Brežice
- Zgornja Ribnica, a hamlet near Brežice

== See also ==
- Rybnica (disambiguation)
- Rîbnița
