= Sarnowski =

Sarnowski (feminine: Sarnowska) is a Polish surname associated with the place names Sarnów, Sarnow, Sarnowa, Sarnowo. Notable people include:

- Nikodem Sulik-Sarnowski (1893–1954), Polish general
- Stefan Sarnowski (1939–2014), Polish philosopher
- Thomas von Sarnowski (born 1988), German politician
