= Buszynko =

Buszynko may refer to the following places in Koszalin County, West Pomeranian Voivodeship, Poland:

- Buszynko Drugie
- Buszynko Pierwsze
