= Piaszczyte =

Piaszczyte may refer to:

- Piaszczyte, Koszalin County, a settlement in West Pomeranian Voivodeship, Poland
- Piaszczyte, Stargard County, a settlement in West Pomeranian Voivodeship, Poland

== See also ==
- Piaszczyce, a village in Radomsko County, Łódź Voivodeship, Poland
