= Hopfenberg =

Hopfenberg (German, hop hill) may refer to:

== Places ==
- Hopfenberg (Ried), in the borough of Ried im Innkreis, Upper Austria
- Chmielno, West Pomeranian Voivodeship (German: Hopfenberg), Poland
- Bad Hopfenberg, a spa town in North Rhine-Westphalia, Germany
- Tunnel Hopfenberg, on Bundesautobahn 44 in Hesse, Germany

== Hills in Germany ==
- Hopfenberg (Rhön), in the Brückenau Kuppenrhön near Schwarzenfels (Sinntal), Main-Kinzig-Kreis, Hesse
- Hopfenberg (Waltershausen), near Winterstein (Waltershausen), county of Gotha, Thuringia
- A hill in the Göttingen Forest, South Lower Saxony, Germany

== See also ==
- Hoffenberg
- Hoppenberg
