= Trzebień =

Trzebień may refer to the following places in Poland:

- Trzebień, Lower Silesian Voivodeship (south-west Poland)
- Trzebień, Kuyavian-Pomeranian Voivodeship (north-central Poland)
- Trzebień, Masovian Voivodeship (east-central Poland)
- Trzebień, Greater Poland Voivodeship (west-central Poland)
- Trzebień, Choszczno County in West Pomeranian Voivodeship (north-west Poland)
- Trzebień, Koszalin County in West Pomeranian Voivodeship (north-west Poland)
- Trzebień, Stargard County in West Pomeranian Voivodeship (north-west Poland)
