= Drzewiany =

- Village
- Location within Poland
- Coordinates: 53°59′N 16°41′E
- Country: Poland
- Voivodeship: West Pomeranian
- County: Koszalin
- Gmina: Bobolice
- Population: 340

Drzewiany [dʐɛˈvjanɨ] (German Drawehn) is a village in the administrative district of Gmina Bobolice, within Koszalin County, West Pomeranian Voivodeship, in north-western Poland. It lies approximately 8 km (5 mi) north-east of Bobolice, 40 km (25 mi) south-east of Koszalin, and 153 km (95 mi) north-east of the regional capital Szczecin.

For the history of the region, see History of Pomerania.

The village has a population of 340.
