= Glinka, West Pomeranian Voivodeship =

Glinka
- Village
- Location within Poland
- Coordinates: 54°0′0″N 16°27′17″E
- Country: Poland
- Voivodeship: West Pomeranian
- County: Koszalin
- Gmina: Bobolice
- Population: 19

Glinka [ˈɡlinka] (German Glienke) is a village in the administrative district of Gmina Bobolice, within Koszalin County, West Pomeranian Voivodeship, in north-western Poland. It lies approximately 11 km (7 mi) north-west of Bobolice, 27 km (17 mi) south-east of Koszalin, and 140 km (87 mi) north-east of the regional capital Szczecin.

For the history of the region, see History of Pomerania.

The village has a population of 19.
