= Jarostowo =

- Village
- Location within Poland
- Coordinates: 53°13′7″N 15°34′32″E
- Country: Poland
- Voivodeship: West Pomeranian
- County: Choszczno
- Gmina: Recz

Jarostowo [jarɔsˈtɔvɔ] is a village in the administrative district of Gmina Recz, within Choszczno County, West Pomeranian Voivodeship, in north-western Poland. It lies approximately 6 km (4 mi) south of Recz, 14 km (9 mi) north-east of Choszczno, and 70 km (43 mi) east of the regional capital Szczecin.
