= Zdbino =

- Settlement
- Location within Poland
- Coordinates: 53°19′15″N 15°32′46″E
- Country: Poland
- Voivodeship: West Pomeranian
- County: Choszczno
- Gmina: Recz
- Population: 0

Zdbino [ˈzdbinɔ] (German: Stabenow Ziegelei) is a former settlement in the administrative district of Gmina Recz, within Choszczno County, West Pomeranian Voivodeship, in north-western Poland. It lies approximately 7 km (4 mi) north of Recz, 20 km (12 mi) north-east of Choszczno, and 65 km (40 mi) east of the regional capital Szczecin.

== See also ==
- History of Pomerania.
