= Kurowo, West Pomeranian Voivodeship =

Kurowo
- Village
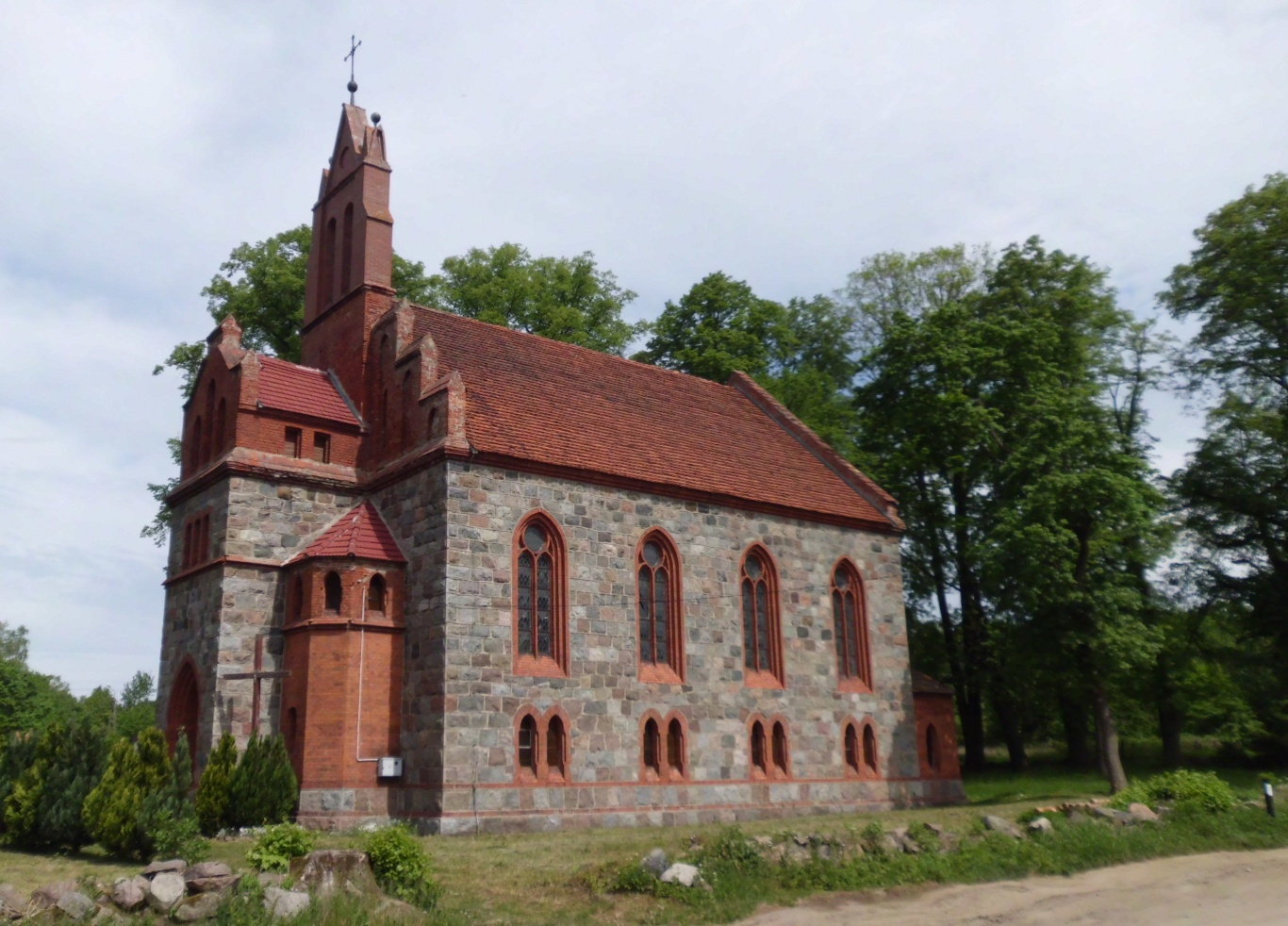
- Neo-Gothic church

- Location within Poland
- Coordinates: 54°2′N 16°34′E
- Country: Poland
- Voivodeship: West Pomeranian
- County: Koszalin
- Gmina: Bobolice
- Population: 380

Kurowo [kuˈrɔvɔ] (German Kurow) is a village in the administrative district of Gmina Bobolice, within Koszalin County, West Pomeranian Voivodeship, in north-western Poland. It lies approximately 10 km (6 mi) north of Bobolice, 31 km (19 mi) south-east of Koszalin, and 148 km (92 mi) north-east of the regional capital Szczecin.

For the history of the region, see History of Pomerania.

The village has a population of 380.
