= Reibnitz =

Reibnitz may refer to:

- Günther von Reibnitz (1894–1983), a German cavalry officer
- Karl Gustav Hans Otto Freiherr von Reibnitz, a minister-president of the Free State of Mecklenburg-Strelitz
- Princess Michael of Kent (born 1945), a member of the British royal family, born Baroness Marie Christine von Reibnitz
- Rybnica, Jelenia Góra County, a Polish village known as Reibnitz in German

== See also ==
- Rybnica (disambiguation)
