= Sicko, Poland =

Sicko
- Village
- Location within Poland
- Coordinates: 53°15′N 15°29′E
- Country: Poland
- Voivodeship: West Pomeranian
- County: Choszczno
- Gmina: Recz

Sicko [ˈɕit͡skɔ] (German: Altenwedel) is a village in the administrative district of Gmina Recz, in Choszczno County, West Pomeranian Voivodeship, in northwestern Poland. It is approximately 5 km (3 mi) west of Recz, 11 km (7 mi) north-east of Choszczno, and 63 km (39 mi) east of the regional capital Szczecin.

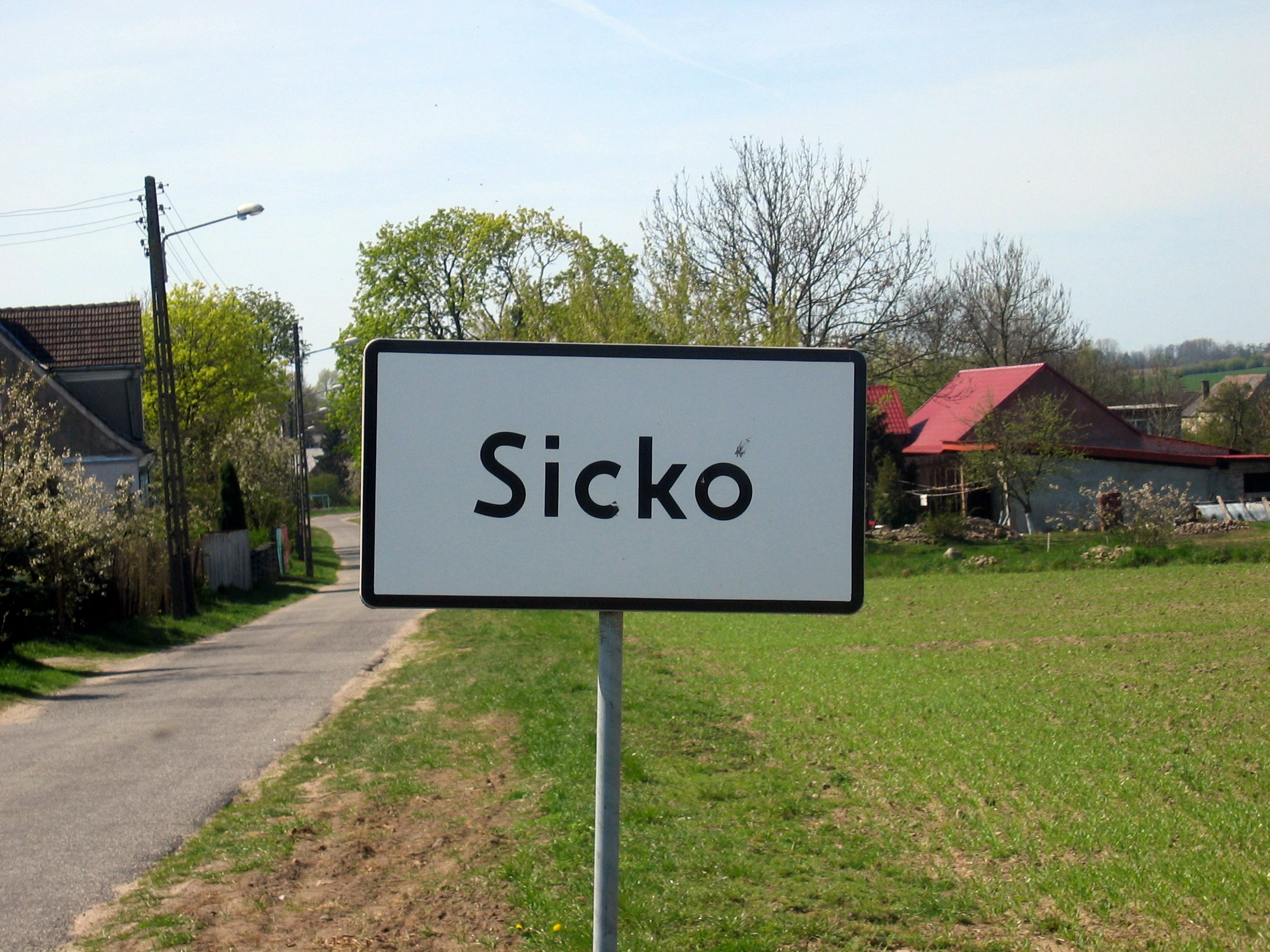
Sicko

== See also ==
- History of Pomerania
