= Wojęcino =

- Village
- Location within Poland
- Coordinates: 53°59′N 16°23′E
- Country: Poland
- Voivodeship: West Pomeranian
- County: Koszalin
- Gmina: Bobolice
- Population: 90

Wojęcino [vɔjɛnˈt͡ɕinɔ] is a village in the administrative district of Gmina Bobolice, within Koszalin County, West Pomeranian Voivodeship, in north-western Poland. It lies approximately 14 km (9 mi) west of Bobolice, 26 km (16 mi) south-east of Koszalin, and 135 km (84 mi) north-east of the regional capital Szczecin.

The village has a population of 90.
