= Jatynka =

- Village
- Location within Poland
- Coordinates: 53°56′42″N 16°27′58″E
- Country: Poland
- Voivodeship: West Pomeranian
- County: Koszalin
- Gmina: Bobolice

Jatynka [jaˈtɨnka] is a village in the administrative district of Gmina Bobolice, within Koszalin County, West Pomeranian Voivodeship, in north-western Poland. It lies approximately 8 km (5 mi) west of Bobolice, 33 km (21 mi) south-east of Koszalin, and 138 km (86 mi) north-east of the regional capital Szczecin.
