= Wilczogóra, West Pomeranian Voivodeship =

Wilczogóra
- Village
- Location within Poland
- Coordinates: 54°2′12″N 16°25′34″E
- Country: Poland
- Voivodeship: West Pomeranian
- County: Koszalin
- Gmina: Bobolice

Wilczogóra [vilt͡ʂɔˈɡura] is a village in the administrative district of Gmina Bobolice, within Koszalin County, West Pomeranian Voivodeship, in north-western Poland. It lies approximately 15 km (9 mi) north-west of Bobolice, 23 km (14 mi) south-east of Koszalin, and 140 km (87 mi) north-east of the regional capital Szczecin.
