= Dargin =

Dargin may refer to:

- Dargwa language, Caucasus
- Dargwa people, Caucasus
- Dargiń, Poland

== People with the surname ==
- Alan Dargin (1967–2008), Australian musician
- Edward Vincent Dargin (1898–1981), American Roman Catholic bishop
