= Porost =

- Village
- Location within Poland
- Coordinates: 53°55′47″N 16°39′17″E
- Country: Poland
- Voivodeship: West Pomeranian
- County: Koszalin
- Gmina: Bobolice
- Population: 360

Porost [ˈpɔrɔst] (German Porst) is a village in the administrative district of Gmina Bobolice, within Koszalin County, West Pomeranian Voivodeship, in north-western Poland. It lies approximately 6 km (4 mi) south-east of Bobolice, 42 km (26 mi) south-east of Koszalin, and 148 km (92 mi) north-east of the regional capital Szczecin.

The village has a population of 360.

== See also ==
- History of Pomerania
