= Chełpina =

- Settlement
- Location within Poland
- Coordinates: 53°12′26″N 15°32′24″E
- Country: Poland
- Voivodeship: West Pomeranian
- County: Choszczno
- Gmina: Recz

Chełpina [xɛu̯ˈpina] (formerly German Neu Helpe) is a settlement in the administrative district of Gmina Recz, within Choszczno County, West Pomeranian Voivodeship, in north-western Poland. It lies approximately 7 km (4 mi) south of Recz, 11 km (7 mi) north-east of Choszczno, and 68 km (42 mi) east of the regional capital Szczecin.
