= Ubiedrze =

- Village
- Location within Poland
- Coordinates: 54°1′N 16°32′E
- Country: Poland
- Voivodeship: West Pomeranian
- County: Koszalin
- Gmina: Bobolice
- Population: 100

Ubiedrze [uˈbjɛdʐɛ] (German Ubedel) is a village in the administrative district of Gmina Bobolice, within Koszalin County, West Pomeranian Voivodeship, in north-western Poland. It lies approximately 9 km (6 mi) north-west of Bobolice, 30 km (19 mi) south-east of Koszalin, and 145 km (90 mi) north-east of the regional capital Szczecin.

For the history of the region, see History of Pomerania.

The village has a population of 100.
