= Nowosiółki, West Pomeranian Voivodeship =

Nowosiółki
- Village
- Location within Poland
- Coordinates: 53°56′58″N 16°31′57″E
- Country: Poland
- Voivodeship: West Pomeranian
- County: Koszalin
- Gmina: Bobolice
- Population: 80

Nowosiółki [nɔvɔˈɕuu̯ki] (German Dorfstätt) is a village in the administrative district of Gmina Bobolice, within Koszalin County, West Pomeranian Voivodeship, in north-western Poland. It lies approximately 4 km (2 mi) west of Bobolice, 35 km (22 mi) south-east of Koszalin, and 142 km (88 mi) north-east of the regional capital Szczecin.

For the history of the region, see History of Pomerania.

The village has a population of 80.
