= Ujazd, Koszalin County =

Ujazd
- Village
- Location within Poland
- Coordinates: 53°56′6″N 16°27′8″E
- Country: Poland
- Voivodeship: West Pomeranian
- County: Koszalin
- Gmina: Bobolice
- Population: 20

Ujazd [ˈujast] (German Wilhelmshöhe) is a village in the administrative district of Gmina Bobolice, within Koszalin County, West Pomeranian Voivodeship, in north-western Poland. It lies approximately 9 km (6 mi) west of Bobolice, 33 km (21 mi) south-east of Koszalin, and 136 km (85 mi) north-east of the regional capital Szczecin.

For the history of the region, see History of Pomerania.

The village has a population of 20.
