= Gozd, West Pomeranian Voivodeship =

Gozd
- Village
- Location within Poland
- Coordinates: 54°0′N 16°35′E
- Country: Poland
- Voivodeship: West Pomeranian
- County: Koszalin
- Gmina: Bobolice
- Population: 190

Gozd [ɡɔst] (German Gust) is a village in the administrative district of Gmina Bobolice, within Koszalin County, West Pomeranian Voivodeship, in north-western Poland. It lies approximately 6 km (4 mi) north of Bobolice, 34 km (21 mi) south-east of Koszalin, and 147 km (91 mi) north-east of the regional capital Szczecin.

For the history of the region, see History of Pomerania.

The village has a population of 190.
