= Bożniewice, West Pomeranian Voivodeship =

Bożniewice
- Village
- Location within Poland
- Coordinates: 53°59′59″N 16°25′29″E
- Country: Poland
- Voivodeship: West Pomeranian
- County: Koszalin
- Gmina: Bobolice
- Population: 190

Bożniewice [bɔʐɲɛˈvit͡sɛ] (German Hufenberg) is a village in the administrative district of Gmina Bobolice, within Koszalin County, West Pomeranian Voivodeship, in north-western Poland. It lies approximately 12 km (7 mi) north-west of Bobolice, 26 km (16 mi) south-east of Koszalin, and 138 km (86 mi) north-east of the regional capital Szczecin.

For the history of the region, see History of Pomerania.

The village has a population of 190.
