= Sulibórz, Choszczno County =

Sulibórz
- Village
- Location within Poland
- Coordinates: 53°20′N 15°36′E
- Country: Poland
- Voivodeship: West Pomeranian
- County: Choszczno
- Gmina: Recz

Sulibórz [suˈlibuʂ] (German: Groß Silber) is a village in the administrative district of Gmina Recz, within Choszczno County, West Pomeranian Voivodeship, in north-western Poland. It lies approximately 9 km (6 mi) north-east of Recz, 23 km (14 mi) north-east of Choszczno, and 69 km (43 mi) east of the regional capital Szczecin.

For the history of the region, see History of Pomerania.
