= Opatówek (disambiguation) =

Opatówek may refer to:

- Opatówek, a village in Poland
- Opatówek, West Pomeranian Voivodeship (north-west Poland)
- Commune Opatówek, of which Opatówek is the largest village
