= Pomianka =

- Settlement
- Location within Poland
- Coordinates: 53°13′28″N 15°31′20″E
- Country: Poland
- Voivodeship: West Pomeranian
- County: Choszczno
- Gmina: Recz
- Population: 0

Pomianka [pɔˈmjanka] (German: Neu Pammin) is a former settlement in the administrative district of Gmina Recz, within Choszczno County, West Pomeranian Voivodeship, in north-western Poland. It lies approximately 5 km (3 mi) south of Recz, 11 km (7 mi) north-east of Choszczno, and 66 km (41 mi) east of the regional capital Szczecin.

For the history of the region, see History of Pomerania.
