= Radwanki, West Pomeranian Voivodeship =

Radwanki
- Village
- Location within Poland
- Coordinates: 53°58′50″N 16°35′38″E
- Country: Poland
- Voivodeship: West Pomeranian
- County: Koszalin
- Gmina: Bobolice
- Population: 30

Radwanki (Polish: [raˈdvaŋkʲi]; German: Gorka Ernsthof) is a village in the administrative district of Gmina Bobolice, within Koszalin County, West Pomeranian Voivodeship, in north-western Poland. It lies approximately 4 km (2 mi) north of Bobolice, 35 km (22 mi) south-east of Koszalin, and 147 km (91 mi) north-east of the regional capital Szczecin.

For the history of the region, see History of Pomerania.

The village has a population of 30.
