= Nętkowo =

- Village
- Location within Poland
- Coordinates: 53°15′N 15°37′E
- Country: Poland
- Voivodeship: West Pomeranian
- County: Choszczno
- Gmina: Recz

Nętkowo [nɛntˈkɔvɔ] (German: Nantikow) is a village in the administrative district of Gmina Recz, within Choszczno County, West Pomeranian Voivodeship, in north-western Poland. It lies approximately 5 km (3 mi) east of Recz, 18 km (11 mi) north-east of Choszczno, and 72 km (45 mi) east of the regional capital Szczecin.

For the history of the region, see History of Pomerania.
