= Darżewo, Koszalin County =

Darżewo
- Village
- Location within Poland
- Coordinates: 54°1′54″N 16°25′16″E
- Country: Poland
- Voivodeship: West Pomeranian
- County: Koszalin
- Gmina: Bobolice

Darżewo [darˈʐɛvɔ] (German Darsow) is a village in the administrative district of Gmina Bobolice, within Koszalin County, West Pomeranian Voivodeship, in north-western Poland. It lies approximately 14 km (9 mi) north-west of Bobolice, 23 km (14 mi) south-east of Koszalin, and 139 km (86 mi) north-east of the regional capital Szczecin.

For the history of the region, see History of Pomerania.
