= Sokoliniec =

- Village
- Location within Poland
- Coordinates: 53°17′N 15°29′E
- Country: Poland
- Voivodeship: West Pomeranian
- County: Choszczno
- Gmina: Recz

Sokoliniec [sɔkɔˈliɲɛt͡s] (German: Falkenwalde) is a village in the administrative district of Gmina Recz, within Choszczno County, West Pomeranian Voivodeship, in north-western Poland. It lies approximately 5 km (3 mi) north-west of Recz, 15 km (9 mi) north-east of Choszczno, and 62 km (39 mi) east of the regional capital Szczecin.

For the history of the region, see History of Pomerania.
