= Rybaki, West Pomeranian Voivodeship =

Rybaki
- Village
- Location within Poland
- Coordinates: 53°17′27″N 15°32′30″E
- Country: Poland
- Voivodeship: West Pomeranian
- County: Choszczno
- Gmina: Recz

Rybaki [rɨˈbaki] (formerly German Ziegenhagen) is a village in the administrative district of Gmina Recz, within Choszczno County, West Pomeranian Voivodeship, in north-western Poland. It lies approximately 4 km (2 mi) north of Recz, 17 km (11 mi) north-east of Choszczno, and 66 km (41 mi) east of the regional capital Szczecin.

For the history of the region, see History of Pomerania.
