= Grabowiec, West Pomeranian Voivodeship =

Grabowiec
- Village
- Location within Poland
- Coordinates: 53°15′1″N 15°36′4″E
- Country: Poland
- Voivodeship: West Pomeranian
- County: Choszczno
- Gmina: Recz

Grabowiec [ɡraˈbɔvjɛt͡s] (German: Buchholz) is a village in the administrative district of Gmina Recz, within Choszczno County, West Pomeranian Voivodeship, in north-western Poland. It lies approximately 4 km (2 mi) east of Recz, 17 km (11 mi) north-east of Choszczno, and 71 km (44 mi) east of the regional capital Szczecin.

== See also ==
- History of Pomerania
