= Kraśnik, West Pomeranian Voivodeship =

Kraśnik
- Village
- Location within Poland
- Coordinates: 53°14′27″N 15°38′44″E
- Country: Poland
- Voivodeship: West Pomeranian
- County: Choszczno
- Gmina: Recz

Kraśnik [ˈkraɕnik] (German: Kratznick) is a village in the administrative district of Gmina Recz, within Choszczno County, West Pomeranian Voivodeship, in north-western Poland. It lies approximately 7 km (4 mi) east of Recz, 19 km (12 mi) north-east of Choszczno, and 74 km (46 mi) east of the regional capital Szczecin.

For the history of the region, see History of Pomerania.
