= Przydargiń =

- Village
- Location within Poland
- Coordinates: 54°0′12″N 16°31′7″E
- Country: Poland
- Voivodeship: West Pomeranian
- County: Koszalin
- Gmina: Bobolice

Przydargiń [pʂɨˈdarɡiɲ] (German Priddargen) is a village in the administrative district of Gmina Bobolice, within Koszalin County, West Pomeranian Voivodeship, in north-western Poland. It lies approximately 8 km (5 mi) north-west of Bobolice, 30 km (19 mi) south-east of Koszalin, and 144 km (89 mi) north-east of the regional capital Szczecin.

For the history of the region, see History of Pomerania.
