= Bytowo =

Bytowo may refer to:

- Bytowo, Choszczno County, Poland
- Bytowo, Stargard County, Poland
