= Pamięcin, West Pomeranian Voivodeship =

Pamięcin
- Village
- Location within Poland
- Coordinates: 53°12′17″N 15°34′5″E
- Country: Poland
- Voivodeship: West Pomeranian
- County: Choszczno
- Gmina: Recz

Pamięcin [paˈmjɛnt͡ɕin] (German: Denkhaus) is a village in the administrative district of Gmina Recz, within Choszczno County, West Pomeranian Voivodeship, in north-western Poland. It lies approximately 7 km (4 mi) south of Recz, 12 km (7 mi) east of Choszczno, and 70 km (43 mi) east of the regional capital Szczecin.

For the history of the region, see History of Pomerania.
