= Krępa, West Pomeranian Voivodeship =

Krępa
- Village
- Location within Poland
- Coordinates: 54°1′N 16°22′E
- Country: Poland
- Voivodeship: West Pomeranian
- County: Koszalin
- Gmina: Bobolice
- Population: 230

Krępa [ˈkrɛmpa] (German Crampe) is a village in the administrative district of Gmina Bobolice, within Koszalin County, West Pomeranian Voivodeship, in north-western Poland. It lies approximately 16 km (10 mi) north-west of Bobolice, 23 km (14 mi) south-east of Koszalin, and 136 km (85 mi) north-east of the regional capital Szczecin.

For the history of the region, see History of Pomerania.

The village has a population of 230.
