= Zieleniewo, Koszalin County =

Zieleniewo
- Village
- Location within Poland
- Coordinates: 54°0′49″N 16°21′18″E
- Country: Poland
- Voivodeship: West Pomeranian
- County: Koszalin
- Gmina: Bobolice

Zieleniewo [ʑɛlɛˈɲɛvɔ] is a village in the administrative district of Gmina Bobolice, within Koszalin County, West Pomeranian Voivodeship, in north-western Poland. It lies approximately 17 km (11 mi) north-west of Bobolice, 22 km (14 mi) south-east of Koszalin, and 135 km (84 mi) north-east of the regional capital Szczecin.
