= Witosław =

Witosław may refer to the following places:

- Witosław, Greater Poland Voivodeship (west-central Poland)
- Witosław, Kuyavian-Pomeranian Voivodeship (north-central Poland)
- Witosław, Lubusz Voivodeship (west Poland)
- Witosław, Choszczno County in West Pomeranian Voivodeship (north-west Poland)
- Witosław, Sławno County in West Pomeranian Voivodeship (north-west Poland)
