= Stare Borne =

- Village
- Location within Poland
- Coordinates: 54°0′6″N 16°40′38″E
- Country: Poland
- Voivodeship: West Pomeranian
- County: Koszalin
- Gmina: Bobolice
- Population: 220

Stare Borne [ˈstarɛ ˈbɔrnɛ] (German Hohenborn) is a village in the administrative district of Gmina Bobolice, within Koszalin County, West Pomeranian Voivodeship, in north-western Poland. It lies approximately 9 km (6 mi) north-east of Bobolice, 39 km (24 mi) south-east of Koszalin, and 153 km (95 mi) north-east of the regional capital Szczecin.

For the history of the region, see History of Pomerania.

The village has a population of 220.
