= Kępsko, West Pomeranian Voivodeship =

Kępsko
- Village
- Location within Poland
- Coordinates: 53°59′28″N 16°43′2″E
- Country: Poland
- Voivodeship: West Pomeranian
- County: Koszalin
- Gmina: Bobolice
- Population: 40

Kępsko [ˈkɛmpskɔ] (German Mühlenkamp) is a village in the administrative district of Gmina Bobolice, within Koszalin County, West Pomeranian Voivodeship, in north-western Poland. It lies approximately 10 km (6 mi) north-east of Bobolice, 41 km (25 mi) south-east of Koszalin, and 155 km (96 mi) north-east of the regional capital Szczecin.

For the history of the region, see History of Pomerania.

The village has a population of 40.
