= Różany, West Pomeranian Voivodeship =

Różany
- Village
- Location within Poland
- Coordinates: 53°58′37″N 16°30′24″E
- Country: Poland
- Voivodeship: West Pomeranian
- County: Koszalin
- Gmina: Bobolice
- Population: 50

Różany [ruˈʐanɨ] is a village in the administrative district of Gmina Bobolice, within Koszalin County, West Pomeranian Voivodeship, in north-western Poland. It lies approximately 6 km (4 mi) north-west of Bobolice, 32 km (20 mi) south-east of Koszalin, and 142 km (88 mi) north-east of the regional capital Szczecin.

For the history of the region, see History of Pomerania.

The village has a population of 50.
