= Nowe Łozice =

- Village
- Location within Poland
- Coordinates: 53°55′N 16°32′E
- Country: Poland
- Voivodeship: West Pomeranian
- County: Koszalin
- Gmina: Bobolice
- Population: 50

Nowe Łozice [ˈnɔvɛ wɔˈʑit͡sɛ] (German: Neuhütten) is a village in the administrative district of Gmina Bobolice, within Koszalin County, West Pomeranian Voivodeship, in north-western Poland. It lies approximately 5 km (3 mi) south-west of Bobolice, 38 km (24 mi) south-east of Koszalin, and 141 km (88 mi) north-east of the regional capital Szczecin.

For the history of the region, see History of Pomerania.

The village has a population of 50.
