= Łozice, Koszalin County =

Łozice
- Village
- Location within Poland
- Coordinates: 53°54′N 16°35′E
- Country: Poland
- Voivodeship: West Pomeranian
- County: Koszalin
- Gmina: Bobolice
- Population: 40

Łozice [wɔˈʑit͡sɛ] (German Neudorf) is a village in the administrative district of Gmina Bobolice, within Koszalin County, West Pomeranian Voivodeship, in north-western Poland. It lies approximately 6 km (4 mi) south of Bobolice, 41 km (25 mi) south-east of Koszalin, and 143 km (89 mi) east of the regional capital Szczecin.

For the history of the region, see History of Pomerania.

The village has a population of 40.
