= Świelino =

- Village
- Location within Poland
- Coordinates: 54°0′N 16°22′E
- Country: Poland
- Voivodeship: West Pomeranian
- County: Koszalin
- Gmina: Bobolice
- Population: 320

Świelino (Polish: [ɕfjɛˈlinɔ]; German: Schwellin) is a village in the administrative district of Gmina Bobolice, within Koszalin County, West Pomeranian Voivodeship, in north-western Poland. It lies approximately 16 km (10 mi) west of Bobolice, 24 km (15 mi) south-east of Koszalin, and 135 km (84 mi) north-east of the regional capital Szczecin.

For the history of the region, see History of Pomerania.

The village has a population of 320.
