= Lubieniów =

- Village
- Location within Poland
- Coordinates: 53°13′15″N 15°36′35″E
- Country: Poland
- Voivodeship: West Pomeranian
- County: Choszczno
- Gmina: Recz

Lubieniów [luˈbjɛɲuf] (formerly the German village of Liebenow) is a village in the administrative district of Gmina Recz, within Choszczno County, West Pomeranian Voivodeship, in north-western Poland. It lies approximately 7 km (4 mi) south-east of Recz, 16 km (10 mi) north-east of Choszczno, and 72 km (45 mi) east of the regional capital Szczecin.

For the history of the region, see History of Pomerania.
