= Kłanino, West Pomeranian Voivodeship =

Kłanino
- Village
- Location within Poland
- Coordinates: 54°1′57″N 16°27′45″E
- Country: Poland
- Voivodeship: West Pomeranian
- County: Koszalin
- Gmina: Bobolice
- Population: 470

Kłanino [kwaˈninɔ] (German Klannin) is a village in the administrative district of Gmina Bobolice, within Koszalin County, West Pomeranian Voivodeship, in north-western Poland. It lies approximately 13 km (8 mi) north-west of Bobolice, 25 km (16 mi) south-east of Koszalin, and 142 km (88 mi) north-east of the regional capital Szczecin.

For the history of the region, see History of Pomerania.

The current village has a population of 470.
