= Pomień =

Pomień Odrzywół
- Village
- Location within Poland
- Coordinates: 53°13′N 15°29′E
- Country: Poland
- Voivodeship: West Pomeranian
- County: Choszczno
- Gmina: Recz

Pomień [ˈpɔmjɛɲ] (formerly German Pammin) is a village in the administrative district of Gmina Recz, within Choszczno County, West Pomeranian Voivodeship, in north-western Poland. It lies approximately 7 km (4 mi) south-west of Recz, 8 km (5 mi) north-east of Choszczno, and 64 km (40 mi) east of the regional capital Szczecin.

For the history of the region, see History of Pomerania.
