= Lubowo, Koszalin County =

Lubowo
- Village
- Location within Poland
- Coordinates: 54°3′16″N 16°37′0″E
- Country: Poland
- Voivodeship: West Pomeranian
- County: Koszalin
- Gmina: Bobolice

Lubowo [luˈbɔvɔ] is a village in the administrative district of Gmina Bobolice, within Koszalin County, West Pomeranian Voivodeship, in north-western Poland. It lies approximately 12 km (7 mi) north of Bobolice, 32 km (20 mi) south-east of Koszalin, and 152 km (94 mi) north-east of the regional capital Szczecin.
