= Ostrówek, West Pomeranian Voivodeship =

Ostrówek
- Village
- Location within Poland
- Coordinates: 53°55′44″N 16°35′16″E
- Country: Poland
- Voivodeship: West Pomeranian
- County: Koszalin
- Gmina: Bobolice
- Population: 30

Ostrówek [ɔsˈtruvɛk] (German Ravensbucht) is a village in the administrative district of Gmina Bobolice, within Koszalin County, West Pomeranian Voivodeship, in north-western Poland. It lies approximately 3 km (2 mi) south of Bobolice, 39 km (24 mi) south-east of Koszalin, and 144 km (89 mi) north-east of the regional capital Szczecin.

For the history of the region, see History of Pomerania.

The village has a population of 30.
