= Słutowo =

- Village
- Location within Poland
- Coordinates: 53°17′N 15°36′E
- Country: Poland
- Voivodeship: West Pomeranian
- County: Choszczno
- Gmina: Recz

Słutowo [swuˈtɔvɔ] (German: Steinberg) is a village in the administrative district of Gmina Recz, within Choszczno County, West Pomeranian Voivodeship, in north-western Poland. It lies approximately 5 km (3 mi) north-east of Recz, 19 km (12 mi) north-east of Choszczno, and 70 km (43 mi) east of the regional capital Szczecin.

For the history of the region, see History of Pomerania.
