= Rajsko, West Pomeranian Voivodeship =

Rajsko
- Village
- Location within Poland
- Coordinates: 53°13′30″N 15°32′51″E
- Country: Poland
- Voivodeship: West Pomeranian
- County: Choszczno
- Gmina: Recz

Rajsko [ˈrai̯skɔ] (German: Bethanien) is a village in the administrative district of Gmina Recz, within Choszczno County, West Pomeranian Voivodeship, in north-western Poland. It lies approximately 5 km (3 mi) south of Recz, 12 km (7 mi) north-east of Choszczno, and 68 km (42 mi) east of the regional capital Szczecin.

For the history of the region, see History of Pomerania.
