= Cybulino, Koszalin County =

Cybulino
- Village
- Location within Poland
- Coordinates: 54°1′45″N 16°35′45″E
- Country: Poland
- Voivodeship: West Pomeranian
- County: Koszalin
- Gmina: Bobolice
- Population: 250

Cybulino [t͡sɨbuˈlinɔ] (German: Zeblin) is a village in the administrative district of Gmina Bobolice, within Koszalin County, West Pomeranian Voivodeship, in north-western Poland. It lies approximately 9 km (6 mi) north of Bobolice (Bublitz), 32 km (20 mi) south-east of Koszalin (Köslin), and 149 km (93 mi) north-east of the regional capital Szczecin (Stettin).

For the history of the region, see History of Pomerania.

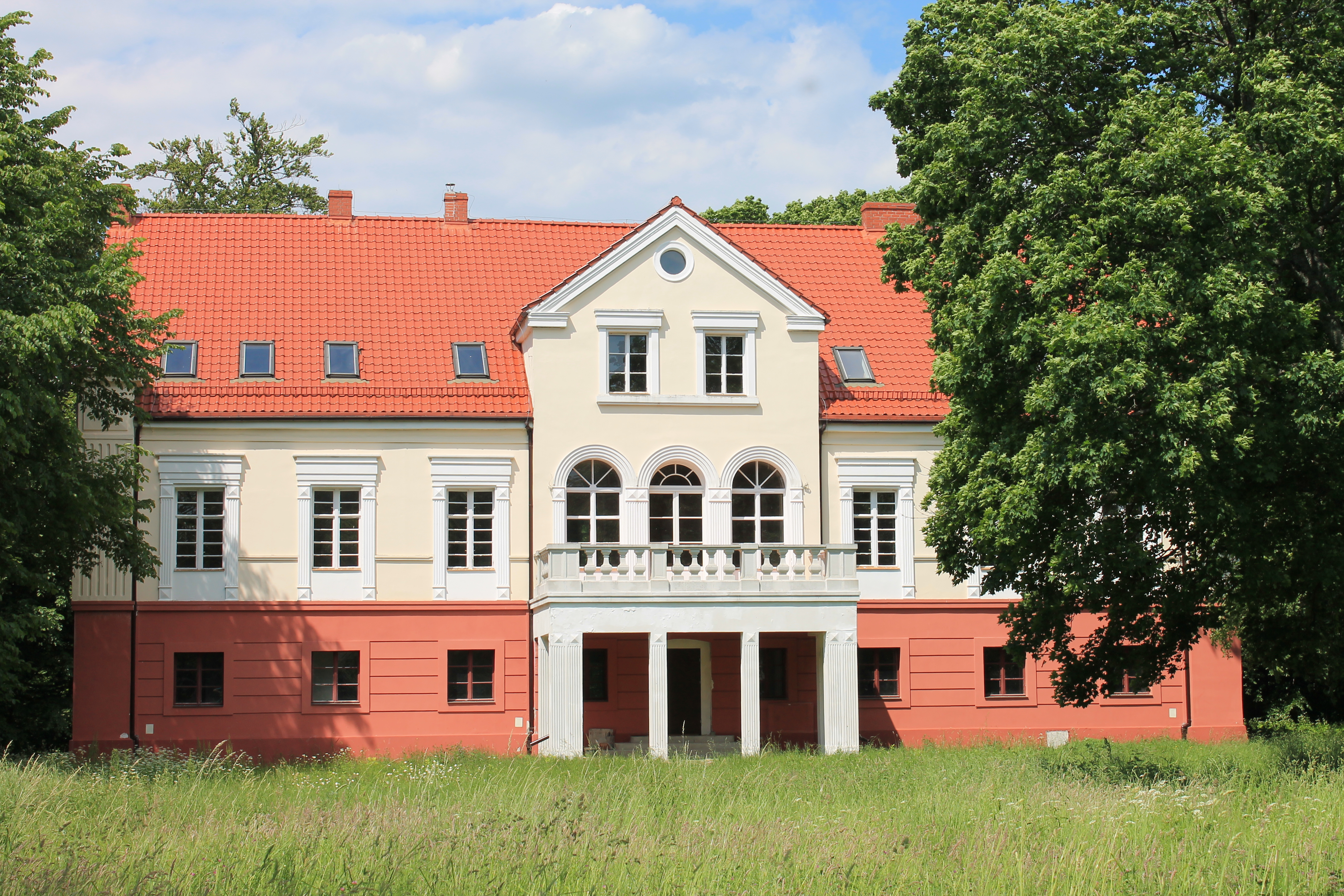
Palace Zeblin (2014)

The village has a population of 250.

== Notable residents ==
- Ewald Christian von Kleist (1715–1759), German poet
