= Wielgoszcz, West Pomeranian Voivodeship =

Wielgoszcz
- Village
- Location within Poland
- Coordinates: 53°16′N 15°34′E
- Country: Poland
- Voivodeship: West Pomeranian
- County: Choszczno
- Gmina: Recz

Wielgoszcz [ˈvjɛlɡɔʂt͡ʂ] (German: Konraden) is a village in the administrative district of Gmina Recz, within Choszczno County, West Pomeranian Voivodeship, in north western Poland. It lies approximately 2 km (1 mi) east of Recz, 16 km (10 mi) north-east of Choszczno, and 68 km (42 mi) east of the regional capital Szczecin.

For the history of the region, see History of Pomerania.
