= Spodnja Ribnica =

- Location in Slovenia
- Coordinates: 45°52′06″N 15°39′58″E
- Country: Slovenia
- Traditional region: Lower Carniola
- Statistical region: Lower Sava
- Municipality: Brežice
- Elevation: 156 m (512 ft)

Spodnja Ribnica (pronounced [ˈspoːdnja ˈɾiːbnitsa]; in older sources also Dolenja Ribnica, German: Unterribenza) is a former settlement in the Municipality of Brežice in eastern Slovenia, close to the border with Croatia. It is now part of the village of Ribnica. The area is part of the traditional region of Lower Carniola. It is now included with the rest of the municipality in the Lower Sava Statistical Region.

== Geography ==
Spodnja Ribnica stands on terraces above the Sava River. The Sotla River discharges into the Sava near Spodnja Ribnica.

== Name ==
The name Spodnja Ribnica literally means 'lower Ribnica', contrasting with neighboring Zgornja Ribnica (literally, 'upper Ribnica'), which stands about 70 meters (230 ft) higher in elevation. The name Ribnica was originally a hydronym derived from the common noun riba 'fish', thus referring to a stream with many fish and, by extension, a settlement along such a stream.

== History ==
Spodnja Ribnica had a population of 44 living in 10 houses in 1869, and 63 living in 12 houses in 1900. Together with neighboring Zgornja Ribnica, Spodnja Ribnica was combined into the village of Ribnica 1953, ending its existence as an independent settlement.
