= Wojsławice, West Pomeranian Voivodeship =

Wojsławice
- Settlement
- Location within Poland
- Coordinates: 53°57′57″N 16°44′3″E
- Country: Poland
- Voivodeship: West Pomeranian
- County: Koszalin
- Gmina: Bobolice

Wojsławice [vɔi̯swaˈvit͡sɛ] is a settlement in the administrative district of Gmina Bobolice, within Koszalin County, West Pomeranian Voivodeship, in north-western Poland.
