= Więcemierz =

- Settlement
- Location within Poland
- Coordinates: 54°00′34″N 16°37′18″E
- Country: Poland
- Voivodeship: West Pomeranian
- County: Koszalin
- Gmina: Bobolice

Więcemierz [vjɛnˈt͡sɛmjɛʂ] (German: Marienhof) is a settlement in the administrative district of Gmina Bobolice, within Koszalin County, West Pomeranian Voivodeship, in north-western Poland.

For the history of the region, see History of Pomerania.
