= Zgornja Ribnica =

- Location in Slovenia
- Coordinates: 45°51′43″N 15°39′55″E
- Country: Slovenia
- Traditional region: Lower Carniola
- Statistical region: Lower Sava
- Municipality: Brežice
- Elevation: 225 m (738 ft)

Zgornja Ribnica (pronounced [ˈzɡoːɾnja ˈɾiːbnitsa]; in older sources also Gorenja Ribnica, German: Oberribenza) is a former settlement in the Municipality of Brežice in eastern Slovenia, close to the border with Croatia. It is now part of the village of Ribnica. The area is part of the traditional region of Lower Carniola. It is now included with the rest of the municipality in the Lower Sava Statistical Region.

== Geography ==
Part of Zgornja Ribnica stands on a terrace above the Road from Ljubljana to Zagreb. The rest of the settlement is scattered across the adjacent hillsides.

== Name ==
The name Zgornja Ribnica literally means 'upper Ribnica', contrasting with neighboring Spodnja Ribnica (literally, 'lower Ribnica'), which stands about 70 meters (230 ft) lower in elevation. The name Ribnica was originally a hydronym derived from the common noun riba 'fish', thus referring to a stream with many fish and, by extension, a settlement along such a stream.

== History ==
Zgornja Ribnica had a population of 69 living in 13 houses in 1869, and 73 living in 13 houses in 1900. Together with neighboring Spodnja Ribnica, Zgornja Ribnica was combined into the village of Ribnica 1953, ending its existence as an independent settlement.
