= Chociwle =

- Village
- Location within Poland
- Coordinates: 53°57′50″N 16°37′08″E
- Country: Poland
- Voivodeship: West Pomeranian
- County: Koszalin
- Gmina: Bobolice
- Population: 190

Chociwle [xɔˈt͡ɕivlɛ] (German Friedrichsfelde) is a village in the administrative district of Gmina Bobolice, within Koszalin County, West Pomeranian Voivodeship, in north-western Poland.

The village has a population of 190.
