= Buszynko Pierwsze =

- Settlement
- Location within Poland
- Coordinates: 53°58′12″N 16°39′20″E
- Country: Poland
- Voivodeship: West Pomeranian
- County: Koszalin
- Gmina: Bobolice

Buszynko Pierwsze [buˈʂɨnkɔ ˈpjɛrfʂɛ] is a settlement in the administrative district of Gmina Bobolice, within Koszalin County, West Pomeranian Voivodeship, in north-western Poland. It lies approximately 6 km (4 mi) north-east of Bobolice, 39 km (24 mi) south-east of Koszalin, and 150 km (93 mi) north-east of the regional capital Szczecin.

For the history of the region, see History of Pomerania.
