= Darginek =

- Settlement
- Location within Poland
- Coordinates: 54°01′16″N 16°23′02″E
- Country: Poland
- Voivodeship: West Pomeranian
- County: Koszalin
- Gmina: Bobolice

Darginek [darˈɡinɛk] (German: Dargener Mühle) is a settlement in the administrative district of Gmina Bobolice, within Koszalin County, West Pomeranian Voivodeship, in north-western Poland.

For the history of the region, see History of Pomerania.
