= Gmina Bobolice =

Gmina Bobolice Bobolice Commune
- Gmina
- Flag Coat of arms
- Interactive map of Gmina Bobolice
- Coordinates (Bobolice): 53°57′N 16°35′E
- Country: Poland
- Voivodeship: West Pomeranian
- County: Koszalin County
- Seat: Bobolice

Area
  - Total: 367.74 km^{2} (141.99 sq mi)

Population (2006)
  - Total: 9,905
  - Density: 26.93/km^{2} (69.76/sq mi)
  - Urban: 4,446
  - Rural: 5,459
- Website: http://www.bobolice.pl/

Gmina Bobolice is an urban-rural gmina (administrative district) in Koszalin County, West Pomeranian Voivodeship, in north-western Poland. Its seat is the town of Bobolice, which lies approximately 37 kilometres (23 mi) south-east of Koszalin and 145 km (90 mi) north-east of the regional capital Szczecin.

The gmina covers an area of 367.74 square kilometres (142.0 sq mi), and as of 2006 its total population is 9,905, of which the population of Bobolice is 4,446, and the population of the rural part of the gmina is 5,459.

== Villages ==
Apart from the town of Bobolice, Gmina Bobolice contains the villages and settlements of Błotko, Boboliczki, Bożniewice, Buszynko Drugie, Buszynko Pierwsze, Chlebowo, Chmielno, Chociwle, Cybulino, Dargiń, Darginek, Darżewo, Dobrociechy, Drzewiany, Dworzysko, Dziupla, Glinka, Głodowa, Górawino, Gozd, Grotniki, Jadwiżyn, Janówiec, Jatynia, Jatynka, Kępiste, Kępsko, Kije, Kłanino, Krępa, Kurówko, Kurowo, Łozice, Łozice-Cegielnia, Lubino, Lubowo, Milczany, Nowe Łozice, Nowosiółki, Opatówek, Ostrówek, Piaszczyte, Pniewki, Pomorzany, Porost, Przydargiń, Radwanki, Różany, Różewko, Rozwarówko, Rylewo, Sarnowo, Spokojne, Stare Borne, Stare Łozice, Świelino, Trzebień, Ubiedrze, Ujazd, Więcemierz, Wilczogóra, Wojęcino, Wojsławice, Zaręby and Zieleniewo.

== Neighbouring gminas ==
Gmina Bobolice is bordered by the gminas of Biały Bór, Grzmiąca, Manowo, Polanów, Świeszyno, Szczecinek and Tychowo.
