= Chlebowo, Koszalin County =

Chlebowo
- Village
- Location within Poland
- Coordinates: 53°57′57″N 16°31′34″E
- Country: Poland
- Voivodeship: West Pomeranian
- County: Koszalin
- Gmina: Bobolice
- Population: 80

Chlebowo [xlɛˈbɔvɔ] (German: Ackerhof) is a village in the administrative district of Gmina Bobolice, within Koszalin County, West Pomeranian Voivodeship, in north-western Poland.

For the history of the region, see History of Pomerania.

The village has a population of 80.
