= Zaręby, West Pomeranian Voivodeship =

Zaręby
- Settlement
- Location within Poland
- Coordinates: 53°54′48″N 16°28′27″E
- Country: Poland
- Voivodeship: West Pomeranian
- County: Koszalin
- Gmina: Bobolice

Zaręby [zaˈrɛmbɨ] is a settlement in the administrative district of Gmina Bobolice, within Koszalin County, West Pomeranian Voivodeship, in north-western Poland.
