= Rybnica =

Rybnica may refer to:

- Rybnica, Jelenia Góra County in Lower Silesian Voivodeship (south-west Poland)
- Rybnica, Wrocław County in Lower Silesian Voivodeship (south-west Poland)
- Rybnica, Lublin Voivodeship (east Poland)
- Rybnica, Świętokrzyskie Voivodeship (south-central Poland)
- Rybnica, West Pomeranian Voivodeship (north-west Poland)
- Rîbnița, Moldova

== See also ==
- Ribnica (disambiguation)
- Rîbnița
