= Hoffenberg =

Hoffenberg is a surname. Notable people with the surname include:

- Marvin Hoffenberg (1914–2012), American economist and political scientist
- Mason Hoffenberg (1922–1986), American writer
- Raymond Hoffenberg (1923–2007), South African endocrinologist
- Steven Hoffenberg, American fraudster
