= Gmina Recz =

Gmina Recz Recz Commune
- Gmina
- Coat of arms
- Interactive map of Gmina Recz
- Coordinates (Recz): 53°15′44″N 15°32′50″E
- Country: Poland
- Voivodeship: West Pomeranian
- County: Choszczno
- Seat: Recz

Area
  - Total: 180.13 km^{2} (69.55 sq mi)

Population (2006)
  - Total: 5,740
  - Density: 31.9/km^{2} (82.5/sq mi)
  - Urban: 2,995
  - Rural: 2,745
- Website: http://www.recz.pl/

Gmina Recz is an urban-rural gmina (administrative district) in Choszczno County, West Pomeranian Voivodeship, in north-western Poland. Its seat is the town of Recz, which lies approximately 15 kilometres (9 mi) north-east of Choszczno and 67 km (42 mi) east of the regional capital Szczecin.

The gmina covers an area of 180.13 square kilometres (69.5 sq mi), and as of 2006 its total population was 5,740 (out of which the population of Recz amounts to 2,995, and the population of the rural part of the gmina is 2,745).

== Villages ==
Apart from the town of Recz, Gmina Recz contains the villages and settlements of Bytowo, Chełpina, Grabowiec, Jarostowo, Kraśnik, Lestnica, Lubieniów, Nętkowo, Pamięcin, Pomianka, Pomień, Rajsko, Rybaki, Rybnica, Sicko, Słutowo, Sokoliniec, Suliborek, Sulibórz, Trzebień, Wielgoszcz, Witosław, Zdbino and Żeliszewo.

== Neighbouring gminas ==
Gmina Recz is bordered by the gminas of Choszczno, Dobrzany, Drawno, Ińsko, Kalisz Pomorski and Suchań.
