= Różewko =

- Settlement
- Location within Poland
- Coordinates: 51°01′28″N 16°31′23″E
- Country: Poland
- Voivodeship: West Pomeranian
- County: Koszalin
- Gmina: Bobolice

Różewko [ruˈʐɛfkɔ] (German: Rosenhof) is a settlement in the administrative district of Gmina Bobolice, within Koszalin County, West Pomeranian Voivodeship, in north-western Poland.

For the history of the region, see History of Pomerania.
