= Rozwarówko =

- Settlement
- Location within Poland
- Coordinates: 53°57′52″N 16°42′47″E
- Country: Poland
- Voivodeship: West Pomeranian
- County: Koszalin
- Gmina: Bobolice

Rozwarówko [rɔzvaˈrufkɔ] is a former settlement in the administrative district of Gmina Bobolice, within Koszalin County, West Pomeranian Voivodeship, in north-western Poland. As of 2010 it no longer figures in the national database of places.

For the history of the region, see History of Pomerania.
