= Górawino =

- Village
- Location within Poland
- Coordinates: 54°01′00″N 16°38′52″E
- Country: Poland
- Voivodeship: West Pomeranian
- County: Koszalin
- Gmina: Bobolice

Górawino [ɡuraˈvinɔ] (German: Gerfin) is a village in the administrative district of Gmina Bobolice, within Koszalin County, West Pomeranian Voivodeship, in north-western Poland.

For the history of the region, see History of Pomerania.
