= Rylewo =

- Settlement
- Location within Poland
- Coordinates: 53°59′25″N 16°35′04″E
- Country: Poland
- Voivodeship: West Pomeranian
- County: Koszalin
- Gmina: Bobolice

Rylewo [rɨˈlɛvɔ] is a settlement in the administrative district of Gmina Bobolice, within Koszalin County, West Pomeranian Voivodeship, in north-western Poland.

For the history of the region, see History of Pomerania.
