= Pomorzany, Koszalin County =

Pomorzany
- Village
- Location within Poland
- Coordinates: 53°58′52″N 16°34′49″E
- Country: Poland
- Voivodeship: West Pomeranian
- County: Koszalin
- Gmina: Bobolice

Pomorzany [pɔmɔˈʐanɨ] (German Pomorzany) is a village in the administrative district of Gmina Bobolice within Koszalin County, West Pomeranian Voivodeship, in north-western Poland.
