= Dargiń =

- Village
- Location within Poland
- Coordinates: 54°0′47″N 16°23′45″E
- Country: Poland
- Voivodeship: West Pomeranian
- County: Koszalin
- Gmina: Bobolice
- Population: 210

Dargiń [ˈdarɡiɲ] (German Dargen) is a village in the administrative district of Gmina Bobolice, within Koszalin County, West Pomeranian Voivodeship, in north-western Poland. It lies approximately 15 km (9 mi) north-west of Bobolice, 24 km (15 mi) south-east of Koszalin, and 137 km (85 mi) north-east of the regional capital Szczecin.

For the history of the region, see History of Pomerania.

The village has a population of 210.
