= Trzebień, Koszalin County =

Trzebień
- Village
- Location within Poland
- Coordinates: 53°57′40″N 16°41′12″E
- Country: Poland
- Voivodeship: West Pomeranian
- County: Koszalin
- Gmina: Bobolice
- Population: 40

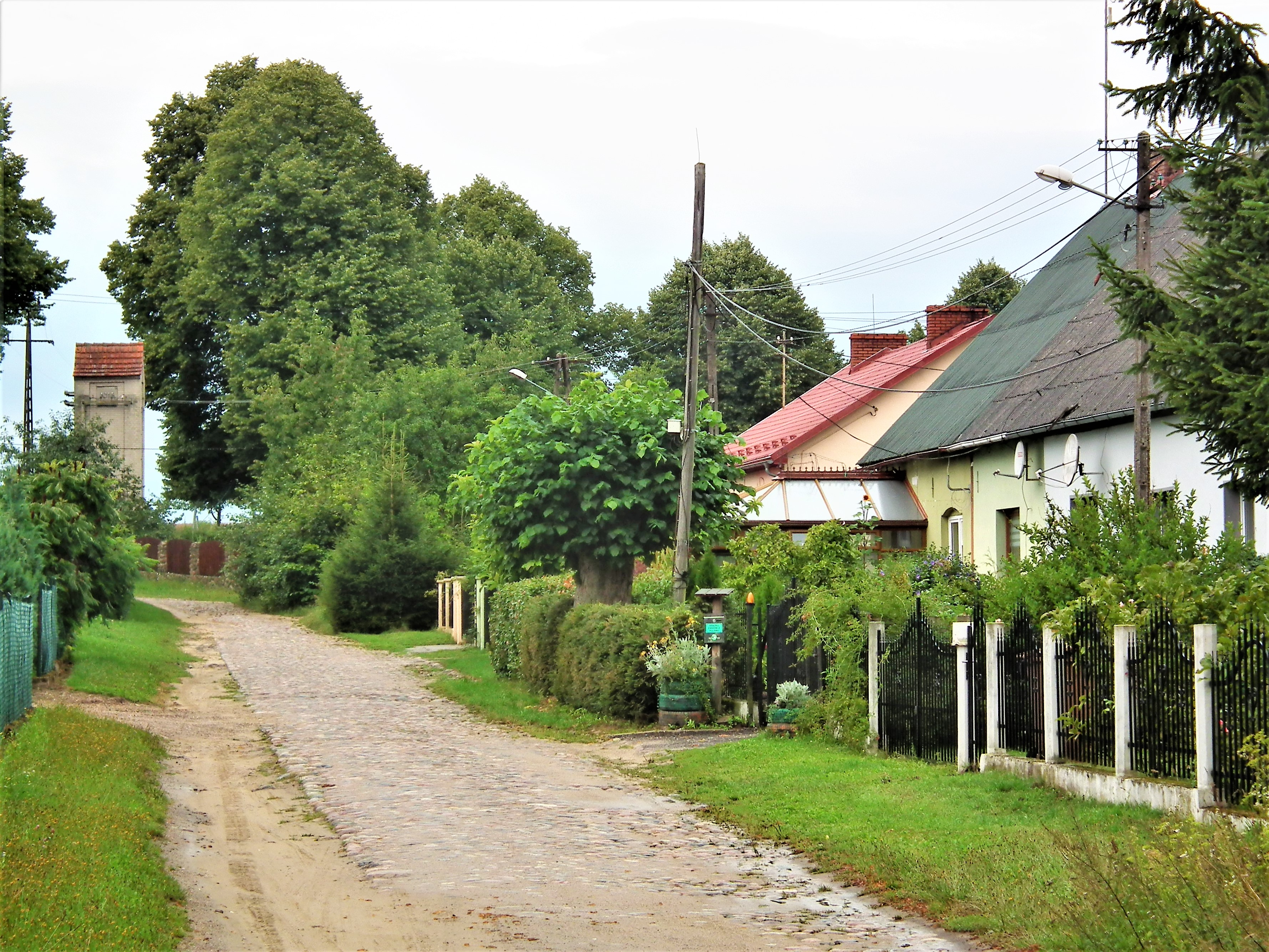

Trzebień [ˈtʂɛbjɛɲ] (German Trzebien) is a village in the administrative district of Gmina Bobolice, within Koszalin County, West Pomeranian Voivodeship, in north-western Poland. It lies approximately 7 km (4 mi) east of Bobolice, 42 km (26 mi) south-east of Koszalin, and 152 km (94 mi) north-east of the regional capital Szczecin.

For the history of the region, see History of Pomerania.

The village has a population of 40.
