= Chmielno, West Pomeranian Voivodeship =

Chmielno
- Village
- Location within Poland
- Coordinates: 53°55′N 16°29′E
- Country: Poland
- Voivodeship: West Pomeranian
- County: Koszalin
- Gmina: Bobolice
- Population: 160

Chmielno [ˈxmjɛlnɔ] (German Hopfenberg) is a village in the administrative district of Gmina Bobolice, within Koszalin County, West Pomeranian Voivodeship, in north-western Poland. It lies approximately 8 km (5 mi) south-west of Bobolice, 36 km (22 mi) south-east of Koszalin, and 138 km (86 mi) north-east of the regional capital Szczecin.

For the history of the region, see History of Pomerania.

The village has a population of 160.
