= Kurówko, West Pomeranian Voivodeship =

Kurówko
- Settlement
- Location within Poland
- Coordinates: 54°03′19″N 16°34′15″E
- Country: Poland
- Voivodeship: West Pomeranian
- County: Koszalin
- Gmina: Bobolice

Kurówko [kuˈrufkɔ] is a settlement in the administrative district of Gmina Bobolice, within Koszalin County, West Pomeranian Voivodeship, in north-western Poland.
