= Lynn Vavreck =

American journalist

- Born: February 14, 1968 (age 58); Cleveland, Ohio, U.S.
- Occupations: Political scientist and columnist

Academic background
- Education: Arizona State University (BS, MA); University of Rochester (MS, PhD)
- Website: lynnvavreck.com

Lynn Vavreck (born February 14, 1968) is an American political scientist and columnist. She is served as a Marvin Hoffenberg Chair in American Politics and Public Policy at University of California in Los Angeles and a contributing columnist to The New York Times. She teaches courses and writes about campaigns, elections, and public opinion. She is a member of American Academy of Arts and Sciences and a winner of Andrew F. Carnegie Prize in the Humanities and Social Sciences.

== Education ==
Vavreck attended Midpark High School in Ohio, where she was inspired by her chemistry teacher to pursue her interests. In 1990, Vavreck completed a bachelor of science in political science, magna cum laude at Arizona State University (ASU). From 1991 to 1992, Vavreck was a press advance representative in the Office of the Vice President of the United States. She earned a master of arts in political science in 1992 from ASU. In 1996, she completed a master of science in political science in 1996 from University of Rochester. Vavreck completed a Ph.D. in political science from University of Rochester in 1997 with concentrations in American politics, political methodology, and political philosophy. She completed post-doctoral studies at Princeton University.

== Career ==
Vavreck was an assistant professor of government at Dartmouth College from July 1998 to June 2001. She then became an assistant professor of political science at University of California, Los Angeles (UCLA) in 2001 and co-founded the Cooperative Campaign Analysis Project (CCAP).

In 2013, Vaverick published her book titled "The Gamble: Choice and Chance in the 2012 Presidential Election," through the Princeton University Press which analyzed the 2012 presidential race between Barack Obama and Mitt Romney. Beginning in April 2014, Vaverick became a contributing columnist for The New York Times' publication, The Upshot after Nate Silver retired. The following year, she received a Carnegie fellowship from the Carnegie Corporation, which granted her $200,000 to fund her study of the impact of super PACs in the 2016 presidential campaign. Vavreck was the doctoral advisor to Michael LaCour during the When contact changes minds scandal.

In January 2018, she became the Marvin Hoffenberg Chair in American Politics and Public Policy at UCLA. That same year, she published “Identity Crisis: The 2016 Presidential Campaign and the Battle for the Meaning of America," alongside John M. Sides and Michael Tesler which analyzed the 2016 presidential election. Vavreck later collaborated with Chris Tausanovitch to collect data through the 2020 elections with a data-gathering and analysis project called Nationscape.

== Selected works ==
=== Books ===
- Vavreck, Lynn (2009). The Message Matters: The Economy and Presidential Campaigns. Princeton University Press. ISBN 9781400830480.
- Sides, John; Vavreck, Lynn (2013). The Gamble: Choice and Chance in the 2012 Presidential Election. Princeton University Press. ISBN 9780691156880.
- Sides, John; Tesler, Michael; Vavreck, Lynn (2019). Identity Crisis: The 2016 Presidential Campaign and the Battle for The Meaning of America. Princeton University Press. ISBN 9780691174198.
