= Bytowo, Choszczno County =

Bytowo
- Settlement
- Location within Poland
- Coordinates: 53°19′55″N 15°32′2″E
- Country: Poland
- Voivodeship: West Pomeranian
- County: Choszczno
- Gmina: Recz

Bytowo [bɨˈtɔvɔ] is a settlement in the administrative district of Gmina Recz, within Choszczno County, West Pomeranian Voivodeship, in north-western Poland. It lies approximately 8 km (5 mi) north of Recz, 21 km (13 mi) north-east of Choszczno, and 64 km (40 mi) east of the regional capital Szczecin.
