= Jatynia =

- Village
- Location within Poland
- Coordinates: 53°58′35″N 16°27′02″E
- Country: Poland
- Voivodeship: West Pomeranian
- County: Koszalin
- Gmina: Bobolice

Jatynia [jaˈtɨɲa] (German Jatzthum) is a village in the administrative district of Gmina Bobolice, within Koszalin County, West Pomeranian Voivodeship, in north-western Poland.

For the history of the region, see History of Pomerania.
