= Trzebień, Choszczno County =

Trzebień
- Settlement
- Location within Poland
- Coordinates: 53°15′51″N 15°31′15″E
- Country: Poland
- Voivodeship: West Pomeranian
- County: Choszczno
- Gmina: Recz
- Population: 13

Trzebień [ˈtʂɛbjɛɲ] (German: Wegnershof) is a settlement in the administrative district of Gmina Recz, within Choszczno County, West Pomeranian Voivodeship, in north-western Poland. It lies approximately 2 km (1 mi) west of Recz, 14 km (9 mi) north-east of Choszczno, and 65 km (40 mi) east of the regional capital Szczecin.

For the history of the region, see History of Pomerania.

The settlement has a population of 13.
