= Daniel Cramer =

German theologian and writer (1568–1637)

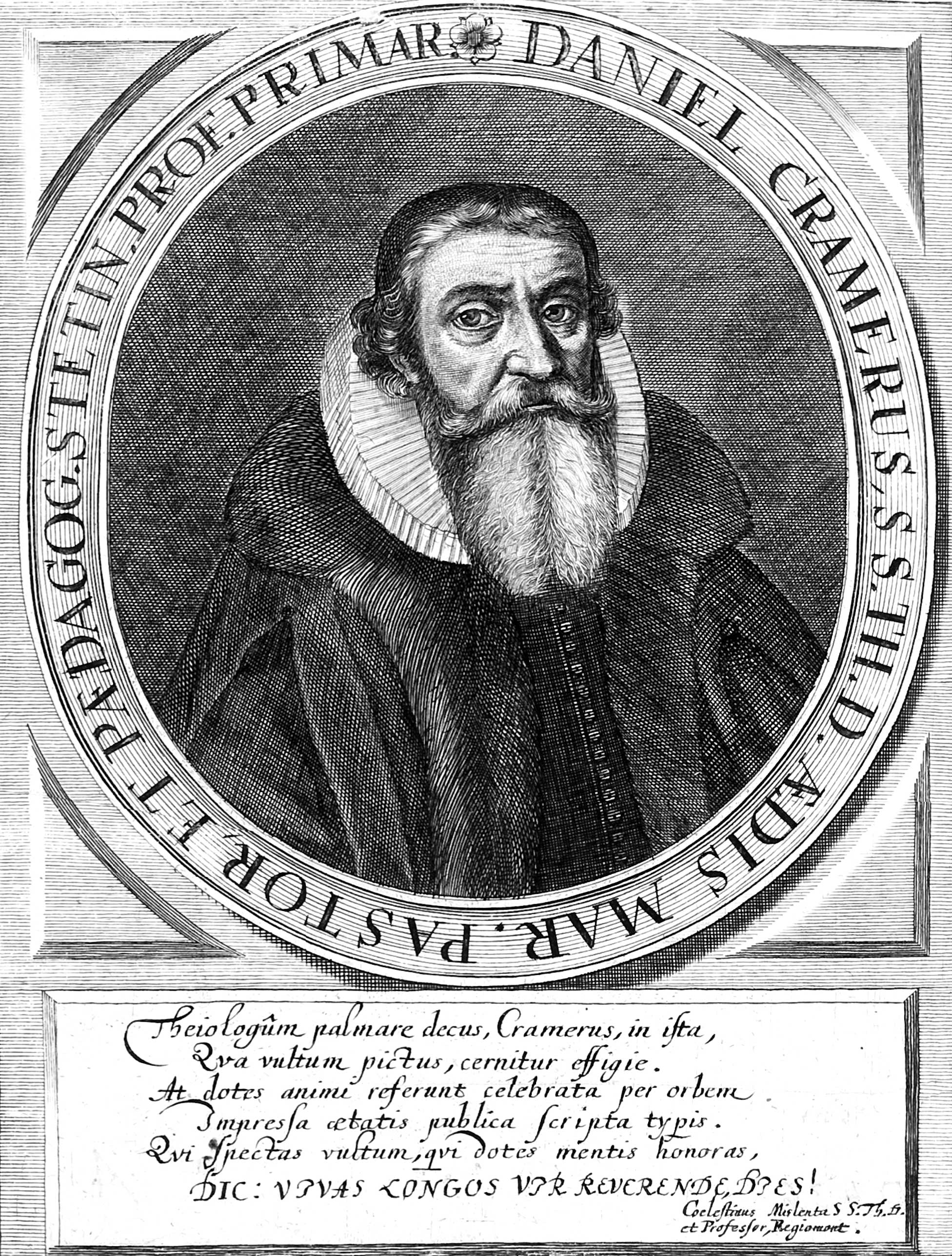
Daniel Cramer.

Daniel Cramer (Daniel Candidus) (20 January 1568 – 5 October 1637) was a German Lutheran theologian and writer from Reetz (Recz), Brandenburg. He was an opponent of the Ramists and the Jesuits.

== Life ==
He became professor and archdeacon at Stettin. Earlier, in the 1590s, he was at the University of Marburg, writing on Aristotle.

== Writings ==
Cramer is remembered for his emblem book The True Society of Jesus and the Rosy Cross (1617). It was reprinted with different titles: Emblemata sacra (1624), and Emblematum sacrorum (1627), composed with the academic and poet Conrad Bachmann (1572–1646). The 1624 edition (with 50 emblems) is the better known. This was followed by the Octaginta emblemata moralia nova (1630). The common denominator of all the Cramer's emblems is a mystic heart, represented in the most different situations: chained, crowned, nailed to a cross, to the roots of a rosary, endowed with wings, undermined by the devil, and so on. The books of emblems composed by Daniel Cramer are considered by some scholars (for example Adam McLean and Giordano Berti) as expressions of the Rosicrucian thought. Indeed, various clues suggest that Cramer was a member of the Rosicrucian brotherhood.

Daniel Cramer wrote also neo-Latin drama, and controversial works in theology. For the Duke of Pomerania, Philipp II, he became involved in writing the church history Pomerania; his preaching in front of Philipp is recorded.

== Works ==
- Areteugenia
- Plagium (1593) drama
- Isagoge in Metaphysicam Aristotelis (1594)
- Synopsis trium librorum rhetoricorum Aristotelis (Stettin, 1597)
- Extract und kurtzer warhafftiger Bericht vom Colloquio zu Regensburg, zwischen unsern Theologen ... und den Gehsuiten (Stettin, 1602)
- Methodus concionandi, de interpretatione cujusvis textus biblici, tam artificiosa quam populari (Stettin, 1605)
- Das Grosse Pomrische Kirchen-Chronicon, four volumes (Stettin, 1628)

== Sources ==
- Adam McLean (editor), Fiona Tait (translator) (1991) The Rosicrucian Emblems of Daniel Cramer: The True Society of Jesus and the Rosy Cross
- Sabine Mödersheim (1994) "Domini Doctrina Coronat". Die geistliche Emblematik Daniel Cramers (1568–1637)
- Wolfgang Harms and Michael Schilling (editors of reprint) (1994) Daniel Cramer: Emblemata Sacra
- Angela Baumann-Koch (2001) Frühe lutherische Gebetsliteratur bei Andreas Musculus und Daniel Cramer
- Friedrich Wagnitz (Kiel 2001), Daniel Cramer (1568–1637). Ein Leben in Stettin um 1600
