= Witosław, Choszczno County =

Witosław
- Settlement
- Location within Poland
- Coordinates: 53°12′4″N 15°36′59″E
- Country: Poland
- Voivodeship: West Pomeranian
- County: Choszczno
- Gmina: Recz
- Population: 7

Witosław [viˈtɔswaf] is a settlement in the administrative district of Gmina Recz, within Choszczno County, West Pomeranian Voivodeship, in north-western Poland. It lies approximately 9 km (6 mi) south-east of Recz, 15 km (9 mi) east of Choszczno, and 73 km (45 mi) east of the regional capital Szczecin.

For the history of the region, see History of Pomerania.

The settlement has a population of 7.
