= Pniewki =

- Settlement
- Location within Poland
- Coordinates: 53°55′17″N 16°41′59″E
- Country: Poland
- Voivodeship: West Pomeranian
- County: Koszalin
- Gmina: Bobolice

Pniewki [ˈpɲɛfki] is a settlement in the administrative district of Gmina Bobolice, within Koszalin County, West Pomeranian Voivodeship, in north-western Poland.

For the history of the region, see History of Pomerania.
