= Dobrociechy =

- Village
- Location within Poland
- Coordinates: 53°59′23″N 16°28′55″E
- Country: Poland
- Voivodeship: West Pomeranian
- County: Koszalin
- Gmina: Bobolice
- Population: 260

Dobrociechy [dɔbrɔˈt͡ɕɛxɨ] (German Dubbertech) is a village in the administrative district of Gmina Bobolice, within Koszalin County, West Pomeranian Voivodeship, in north-western Poland.

For the history of the region, see History of Pomerania.

The village has a population of 260.
