= Paul Kleinschmidt =

German painter

Paul Kleinschmidt (1883–1949) was a German painter.

== Biography ==
Kleinschmidt was born in Bublitz, Pomerania, German Empire (modern Bobolice, Poland).

As a student of art at the Berlin Akademie Kleinschmidt's greatest influence was Anton von Werner, who was at the time Kleinschmidt's history art teacher.

During his time as a student Kleinschmidt met Lovis Corinth who became an informative and strongly educational individual for the young student. Kleinschmidt continued his studies in 1904 under Peter Halm's direction, as well as Heirnrich von Zügel at the Akademie in Munich. It was in Munich that he learned the techniques of lithography and engraving.

Eventually finding his way to Berlin to work as a painter and graphic artist, Kleinschmidt exhibited at the modest 'Sezession' shows in 1908 and 1911.

In 1915, Kleinschmidt began teaching drawing while also taking the role of a technical draughtsman, during which time a great majority of his most remarkable lithographs and engravings were created. Offering these pieces in his first solo exhibition, organized by the Euphorion publishing company in 1923, Kleinschmidt's work would next see light in 1925 at Fritz Gurlitt in Berlin, thereafter graduating to a painting oriented focus.

Kleinschmidt was first introduced to a New York City art collector by the name of Erich Cohn in 1927. A man who later became his sponsor. Kleinschmidt made several rapid moves from Berlin throughout Southern Germany in 1932 ending up in Ulm and within a year's time, Ay near Senden. Shortly thereafter, he and his family found a great struggle in the midst of a political repression. Finally finding a path of emigration to the Netherlands in 1936, Kleinschmidt relieved himself and family of such political angst, from there to France in 1938. He was taken prisoner in February 1940 throughout several camps for a short span but released again post-French capitulation.

Kleinschmidt was forced to stop painting in 1943 under direction of the Nazis during his final years in Bensheim. In 1945, the entirety of his possessions were lost to an air raid. Kleinschmidt died on August 2, 1949, as result of a severe angina pectoris diagnosed in 1940.

A number of his works include: Berghang am See; Titelblatt der Ausstellung Grafik E.L. Kirchner, Galerie Schames; Kuh mit Frauen; Rosen and Seehaus.
