= Marvin Hoffenberg =

American economist and political scientist

- Born: July 7, 1914; Buffalo, New York
- Died: December 30, 2012 (aged 98)
- Education: Ohio State University
- Occupations: Economist, political scientist
- Spouse: Betty S. Hoffenberg
- Children: 2 sons

Marvin Hoffenberg (1914–2012) was an American economist and political scientist. He was an economist for the United States Department of Labor, the RAND Corporation, Johns Hopkins University's Operations Research Office, and The Aerospace Corporation. He was a professor of political science at the University of California, Los Angeles (UCLA) from 1965 to 1986.

== Early life ==
Marvin Hoffenberg was born on July 7, 1914, in Buffalo, New York. He graduated from Ohio State University with a bachelor's degree in 1939. He went on to receive a master's degree from the same university in 1940, and completed the coursework for the PhD in 1941.

== Career ==
Hoffenberg worked as an economist for the United States Department of Labor from 1941 to 1952. During that time, he published research suggested U.S. employment depended on foreign exports. Later in life, he recounted that the Labor Department was his only option as Washington, D.C., was still segregated: "if you were Jewish, you could work for the Department of Labor and, if you were Catholic, you could work for the Department of Commerce."

Hoffenberg became a consultant for the Mutual Security Agency working on the Marshall Plan in Paris in 1952. Back in the United States, he worked for the RAND Corporation from 1952 to 1956. During that time, he co-authored A Time Series Analysis of Interindustry Demands with Kenneth Arrow. Later, he worked as an economist for DeVegh & Co., the Committee for Economic Development, Johns Hopkins University's Operations Research Office, and The Aerospace Corporation.

Hoffenberg joined the University of California, Los Angeles (UCLA) as a research economist in 1965. He taught in the Department of Political Science from 1967 to 1970 as well as the UCLA School of Public Health from 1967 to 1972. He continued to teach Political Science at UCLA until 1986.

== Personal life ==
On July 20, 1947, he married Betty S. Hoffenberg. They were both Jewish. They had two sons. They resided in the Pacific Palisades, California, near Los Angeles.

== Death and legacy ==
He died on December 30, 2012. The Marvin Hoffenberg Chair in American Politics and Public Policy in the Department of Political Science at UCLA is named in his honor. It was formerly held by Timothy Groseclose and is now held by Lynn Vavreck. Additionally, since 2005, the Bollens-Ries-Hoffenberg Lecture is partly named for him.
