= Sarnowo =

Sarnowo may refer to:

- Sarnowo, Chełmno County in Kuyavian-Pomeranian Voivodeship (north-central Poland)
- Sarnowo, Gmina Boniewo in Kuyavian-Pomeranian Voivodeship (north-central Poland)
- Sarnowo, Lipno County in Kuyavian-Pomeranian Voivodeship (north-central Poland)
- Sarnowo, Gmina Lubraniec in Kuyavian-Pomeranian Voivodeship (north-central Poland)
- Sarnowo, Masovian Voivodeship (east-central Poland)
- Sarnowo, Pomeranian Voivodeship (north Poland)
- Sarnowo, Lidzbark County in Warmian-Masurian Voivodeship (north Poland)
- Sarnowo, Nidzica County in Warmian-Masurian Voivodeship (north Poland)
- Sarnowo, West Pomeranian Voivodeship (north-west Poland)
