= Lubino =

- Settlement
- Location within Poland
- Coordinates: 53°53′57″N 16°34′37″E
- Country: Poland
- Voivodeship: West Pomeranian
- County: Koszalin
- Gmina: Bobolice

Lubino [luˈbinɔ] (German: Christophshagen) is a settlement in the administrative district of Gmina Bobolice, within Koszalin County, West Pomeranian Voivodeship, in north-western Poland.

== See also ==
- History of Pomerania
