= Głodowa =

- Village
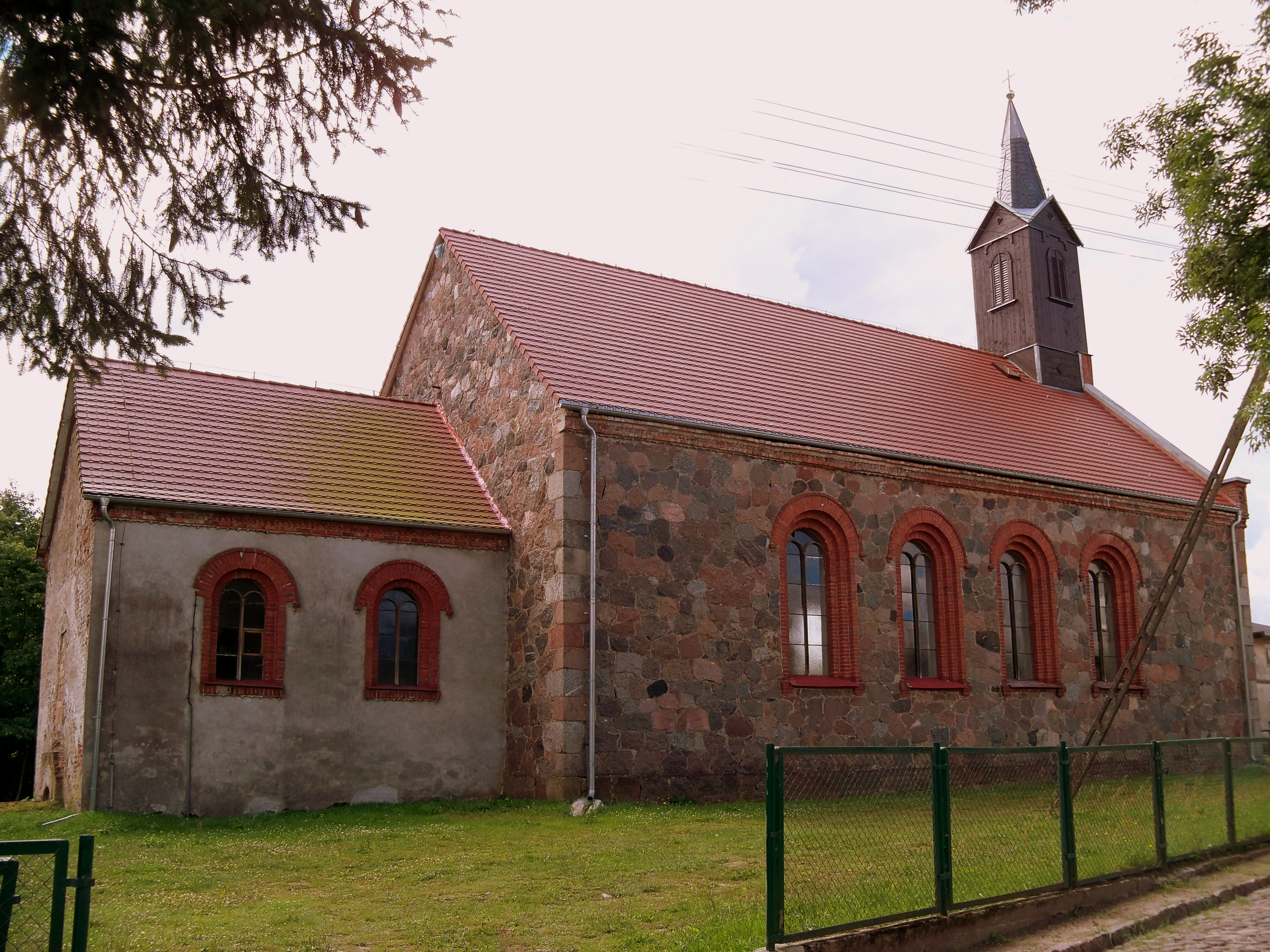
- Our Lady of Częstochowa church in Głodowa

- Location within Poland
- Coordinates: 53°58′46″N 16°32′21″E
- Country: Poland
- Voivodeship: West Pomeranian
- County: Koszalin
- Gmina: Bobolice
- Population: 200

Głodowa [ɡwɔˈdɔva] (German Goldbeck) is a village in the administrative district of Gmina Bobolice, within Koszalin County, West Pomeranian Voivodeship, in north-western Poland.

For the history of the region, see History of Pomerania.

The village has a population of 200.
