= Buszynko Drugie =

- Settlement
- Location within Poland
- Coordinates: 53°58′N 16°38′E
- Country: Poland
- Voivodeship: West Pomeranian
- County: Koszalin
- Gmina: Bobolice

Buszynko Drugie [buˈʂɨnkɔ ˈdruɡʲɛ] is a settlement in the administrative district of Gmina Bobolice, within Koszalin County, West Pomeranian Voivodeship, in north-western Poland. It lies approximately 4 km (2 mi) north-east of Bobolice, 38 km (24 mi) south-east of Koszalin, and 149 km (93 mi) north-east of the regional capital Szczecin.

For the history of the region, see History of Pomerania.
