= Rybnica, West Pomeranian Voivodeship =

Rybnica
- Settlement
- Location within Poland
- Coordinates: 53°14′1″N 15°39′6″E
- Country: Poland
- Voivodeship: West Pomeranian
- County: Choszczno
- Gmina: Recz
- Population: 6

Rybnica [rɨbˈnit͡sa] (German: Karlshöfchen) is a settlement in the administrative district of Gmina Recz, within Choszczno County, West Pomeranian Voivodeship, in north-western Poland. It lies approximately 8 km (5 mi) south-east of Recz, 19 km (12 mi) north-east of Choszczno, and 74 km (46 mi) east of the regional capital Szczecin.

For the history of the region, see History of Pomerania.

The settlement has a population of 6.
