= Opatówek, West Pomeranian Voivodeship =

Opatówek
- Village
- Location within Poland
- Coordinates: 53°55′44″N 16°37′6″E
- Country: Poland
- Voivodeship: West Pomeranian
- County: Koszalin
- Gmina: Bobolice
- Population: 30

Opatówek [ɔpaˈtuvɛk] (German Neuhof) is a village in the administrative district of Gmina Bobolice, within Koszalin County, West Pomeranian Voivodeship, in north-western Poland. It lies approximately 4 km (2 mi) south-east of Bobolice, 41 km (25 mi) south-east of Koszalin, and 146 km (91 mi) north-east of the regional capital Szczecin.

For the history of the region, see History of Pomerania.

The village has a population of 30.
