= Sarnów =

Sarnów may refer to the following places:

- Sarnów, Łask County in Łódź Voivodeship (central Poland)
- Sarnów, Poddębice County in Łódź Voivodeship (central Poland)
- Sarnów, Lublin Voivodeship (east Poland)
- Sarnów, Subcarpathian Voivodeship (south-east Poland)
- Sarnów, Kozienice County in Masovian Voivodeship (east-central Poland)
- Sarnów, Sochaczew County in Masovian Voivodeship (east-central Poland)
- Sarnów, Będzin County in Silesian Voivodeship (south Poland)
- Sarnów, Gliwice County in Silesian Voivodeship (south Poland)
- Sarnów, Opole Voivodeship (south-west Poland)
