= Stefan Sarnowski =

Polish philosopher (1939–2014)

- Born: 1939; Poland
- Died: 12 March 2014 (aged 74–75)

Philosophical work
- Era: 20th & 21st century

Stefan Sarnowski (1939 – 12 March 2014) was a Polish philosopher working as professor at Kazimierz Wielki University in Bydgoszcz.

== Biography ==
Stefan Sarnowski graduated from University of Warsaw, and in 1964 obtained his magister degree for the work Marksizm i darwinizm w etyce Kautskiego (Marxism and Darwinism in Kautski’s ethics), with Marek Fritzhand being the supervisor. After receiving his doctorate, Stefan Sarnowski started working as adjunct at the same university.

== Publications ==
- Zmierzch absolutu? Z problemów filozofii chrześcijańskiej i egzystencjalistycznej (1974);
- Krytyka filozofii metafizycznej (1982);
- Świadomość i czas: o początkach filozofii współczesnej (1985);
- Berkeley: zdrowy rozsądek i idealizm (1988);
- Rozumność i świat - próba wprowadzenia do filozofii (1988);
- O filozofii i metafilozofii (1991);
- Problemy etyki: wybór tekstów (1993; opracowanie);
- Krytyka rozumu pedagogicznego (1993; redakcja);
- Jedność i wielość: zbiór rozpraw (1996; redakcja);
- Wokół Kanta i innych: zbiór rozpraw (1998; redakcja);
- Między filozofią i polityką: platonizm i jego interpretacje (1998);
- Od Platona do współczesności (1999; redakcja);
- Filozofia a polityka (2001);
- Paradoksy i absurdy filozofii (2002);
- O metafilozofii jako filozofii filozofii (2007).
