= Ribnica, Mavrovo i Rostuše =

Ribnica Рибница Rimnicë
- Village
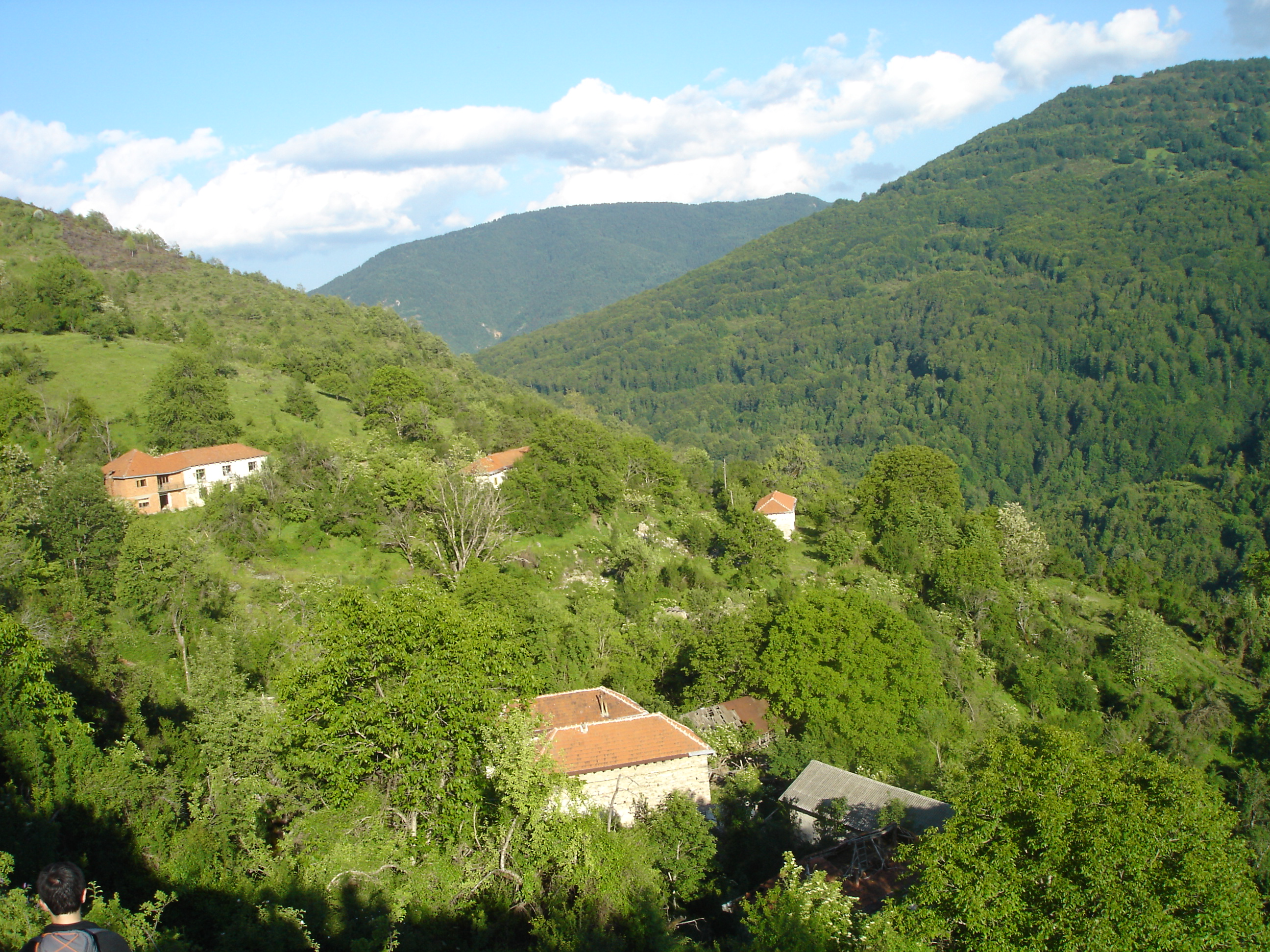
- Ribnica

- Location within North Macedonia
- Coordinates: 41°43′N 20°36′E
- Country: North Macedonia
- Region: Polog
- Municipality: Mavrovo and Rostuša

Population (2021)
  - Total: 0
- Time zone: UTC+1 (CET)
  - Summer (DST): UTC+2 (CEST)
- Car plates: GV
- Website: .

Ribnica (Macedonian: Рибница, Albanian: Rimnicë) is an uninhabited village in the municipality of Mavrovo and Rostuša, North Macedonia.

== Demographics ==
Ribnica (Ribnica) is recorded in the Ottoman defter of 1467 as a village in the ziamet of Reka which was under the authority of Karagöz Bey. The village had a total of 14 households and was divided in two parts, the smaller one named Ribniçica, with 4 of the households. The anthroponymy attested depicts an Albanian-Slavic character with a slight predominance of Albanian anthroponyms, with cases of Slavicisation, i.e Miho Tanushoviq. In 1536/39, the village has 34 Christian families and 3 bachelors, while in the 1583 census, Ribnica is not recorded, likely having merged with Ribniçica (Kuçuk Ribnica), which is a historic village and was located northeast of Dibra in the Reka District. In 1467, it is recorded under the name Ribiçicë and counted 4 families, with the heads of families: In the 1536/39 census, it is recorded under the name Kuçuk Ribnica and had 42 families, 4 bachelors and 1 Muslim family. Meanwhile, in the 1583 census, the village is not recorded or at least it may have been recorded under another name.

In statistics gathered by Vasil Kanchov in 1900, the village of Ribnica was inhabited by 120 Christian Albanians and 200 Muslim Albanians.

As of the 2021 census, Ribnica had zero residents.

According to the 2002 census, the village had a total of 5 inhabitants. Ethnic groups in the village include:

- Albanians 5
