= Piaszczyte, Stargard County =

Piaszczyte
- Hamlet (colony)
- Location within Poland Location within West Pomeranian Voivodeship
- Coordinates: 53°27′48″N 15°33′40″E
- Country: Poland
- Voivodeship: West Pomeranian
- County: Stargard
- Gmina: Ińsko
- Time zone: UTC+1 (CET)
  - Summer (DST): UTC+2 (CEST)
- Postal code: 73-140
- Area code: +48 91

Piaszczyte (Polish: [pjaʂˈt͡ʂɘ̟.tɛ]) is a hamlet (colony) in the West Pomeranian Voivodeship, Poland, located within the Gmina Ińsko, Stargard County.
