= Piaszczyte, Koszalin County =

Piaszczyte
- Settlement
- Location within Poland
- Coordinates: 53°57′40″N 16°27′15″E
- Country: Poland
- Voivodeship: West Pomeranian
- County: Koszalin
- Gmina: Bobolice

Piaszczyte [pjaʂˈt͡ʂɨtɛ] (German: Haferland) is a settlement in the administrative district of Gmina Bobolice, within Koszalin County, West Pomeranian Voivodeship, in north-western Poland.

For the history of the region, see History of Pomerania.
