= Operations Research Office =

Civilian military research center

The Operations Research Office (ORO) was a civilian military research center founded in 1948 by the United States Army. It was run under contract by Johns Hopkins University and is regarded as one of the founding institutes of operations research as an interdisciplinary science.

The organization's offices were originally at Fort McNair, Washington, D.C. They moved to Chevy Chase, Maryland in 1952. In 1961, the Army discontinued Johns Hopkins University's contract, and the ORO was dissolved. Soon after, the Research Analysis Corporation (RAC) was founded, which assumed the ORO's projects and most of its employees. The RAC was funded by the Army until June 1972.
