= Ribnica, Brežice =

Ribnica
- Location in Slovenia
- Coordinates: 45°51′48.36″N 15°39′59.34″E
- Country: Slovenia
- Traditional region: Lower Carniola
- Statistical region: Lower Sava
- Municipality: Brežice

Area
  - Total: 2 km^{2} (0.77 sq mi)
- Elevation: 222.3 m (729 ft)

Population (2020)
  - Total: 115
  - Density: 58/km^{2} (150/sq mi)

Ribnica (pronounced [ˈɾiːbnitsa]) is a settlement on the right bank of the Sava River in the Municipality of Brežice in eastern Slovenia, close to the border with Croatia. The area is part of the traditional region of Lower Carniola. It is now included with the rest of the municipality in the Lower Sava Statistical Region.

== Name ==
The name Ribnica was originally a hydronym derived from the common noun riba 'fish', thus referring to a stream with many fish and, by extension, a settlement along such a stream.

== Cultural heritage ==
Archaeological excavations in the area have revealed building foundations of a small temple and other buildings; remains of a hypocaust, a well, and a burial ground point to the site of a Roman mansio on the Roman road from Emona to Siscia. The settlement was known as Romula.
