= Recz =

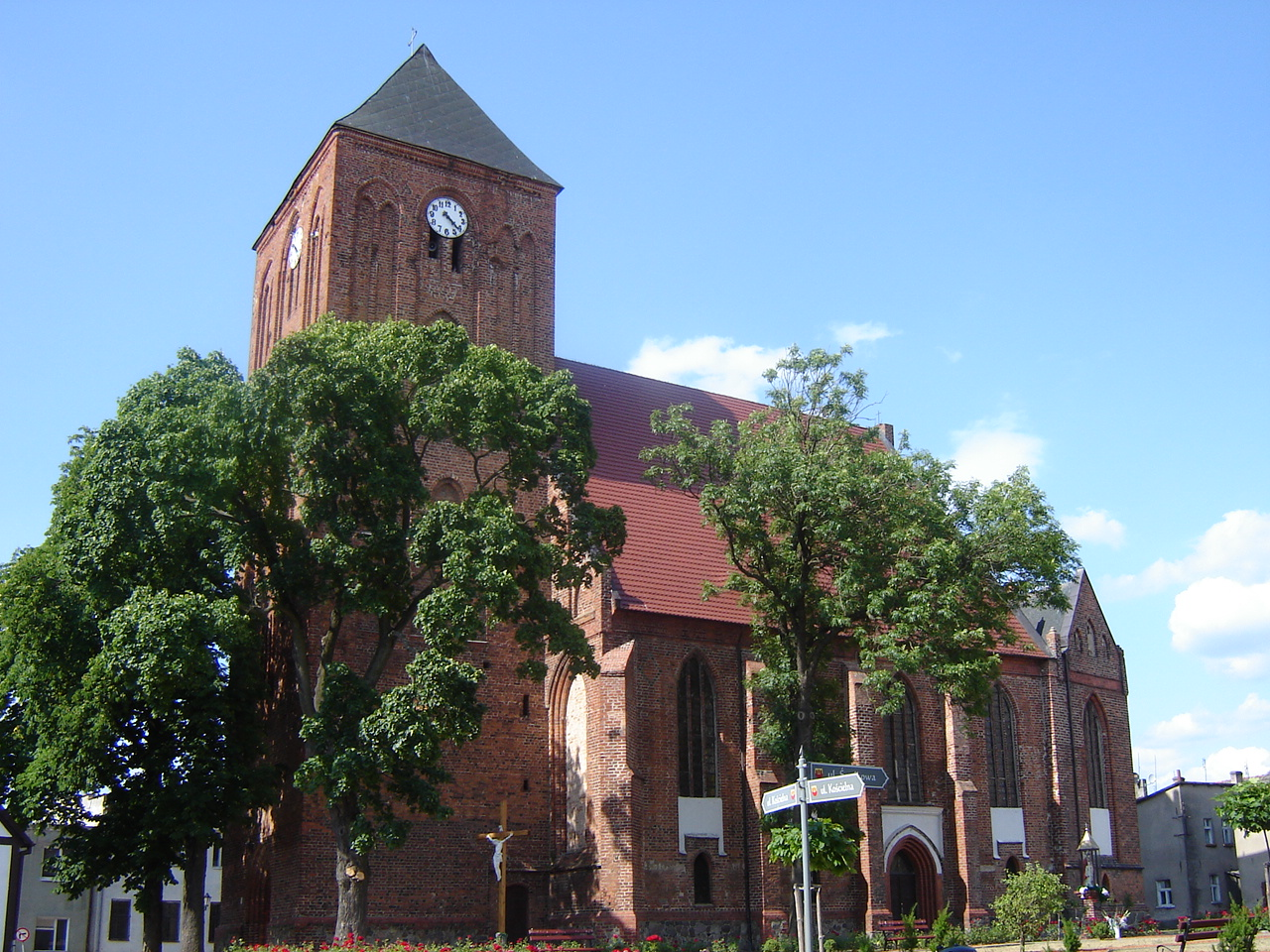
- Church of Jesus, the King

- Flag Coat of arms

- Location within Poland
- Coordinates: 53°15′44″N 15°32′50″E
- Country: Poland
- Voivodeship: West Pomeranian
- County: Choszczno
- Gmina: Recz

Area
  - Total: 12.39 km^{2} (4.78 sq mi)

Population (2010)
  - Total: 2,963
  - Density: 239.1/km^{2} (619.4/sq mi)
- Time zone: UTC+1 (CET)
  - Summer (DST): UTC+2 (CEST)
- Postal code: 73-210
- Vehicle registration: ZCH
- Website: https://www.recz.pl/

Recz [rɛt͡ʂ] (German: Reetz) is a town in Choszczno County, West Pomeranian Voivodeship, in north-western Poland, with a population of 2,963 as of 2010.

== History ==
The settlement dates back to the Early Middle Ages, and in the 10th century it became part of the emerging Polish state under its first historic ruler Mieszko I. Recz was first mentioned in 1269. In the late 13th century a Cistercian nunnery was founded. In 1373 Recz became part of the Lands of the Bohemian Crown (or Czech Lands), ruled by the Luxembourg dynasty. In 1402, the Luxembourgs reached an agreement with Poland in Kraków. Poland was to buy and re-incorporate Recz and its surroundings, but eventually the Luxembourgs sold the town to the Teutonic Order, whose rule lasted until 1454.

During the Polish-Swedish War, in 1657 the town was captured by Poles. From the 18th century it was part of the Kingdom of Prussia and subsequently in 1871 it became part of unified Germany. During World War II, the German administration operated two forced labour subcamps of the Stalag II-D prisoner-of-war camp in the town. After the defeat of Nazi Germany in World War II, in 1945, it became again part of Poland. The German populace was expelled in accordance with the Potsdam Agreement.

== Transport ==
Recz lies on the junction of national road 10 and voivideship road 151.

National road 10 connects Recz to Szczecin to the west and to Piła to the east

Recz has a station on the Szczecin-Piła railway line.

== Demographics ==
Historical population

Year	Pop.	±%
1871	3,035	—
1880	3,312	+9.1%
1890	3,166	−4.4%
1900	3,033	−4.2%
1910	2,939	−3.1%

Year	Pop.	±%
1925	2,968	+1.0%
1950	1,210	−59.2%
1960	1,931	+59.6%
2010	2,963	+53.4%

== Gallery ==
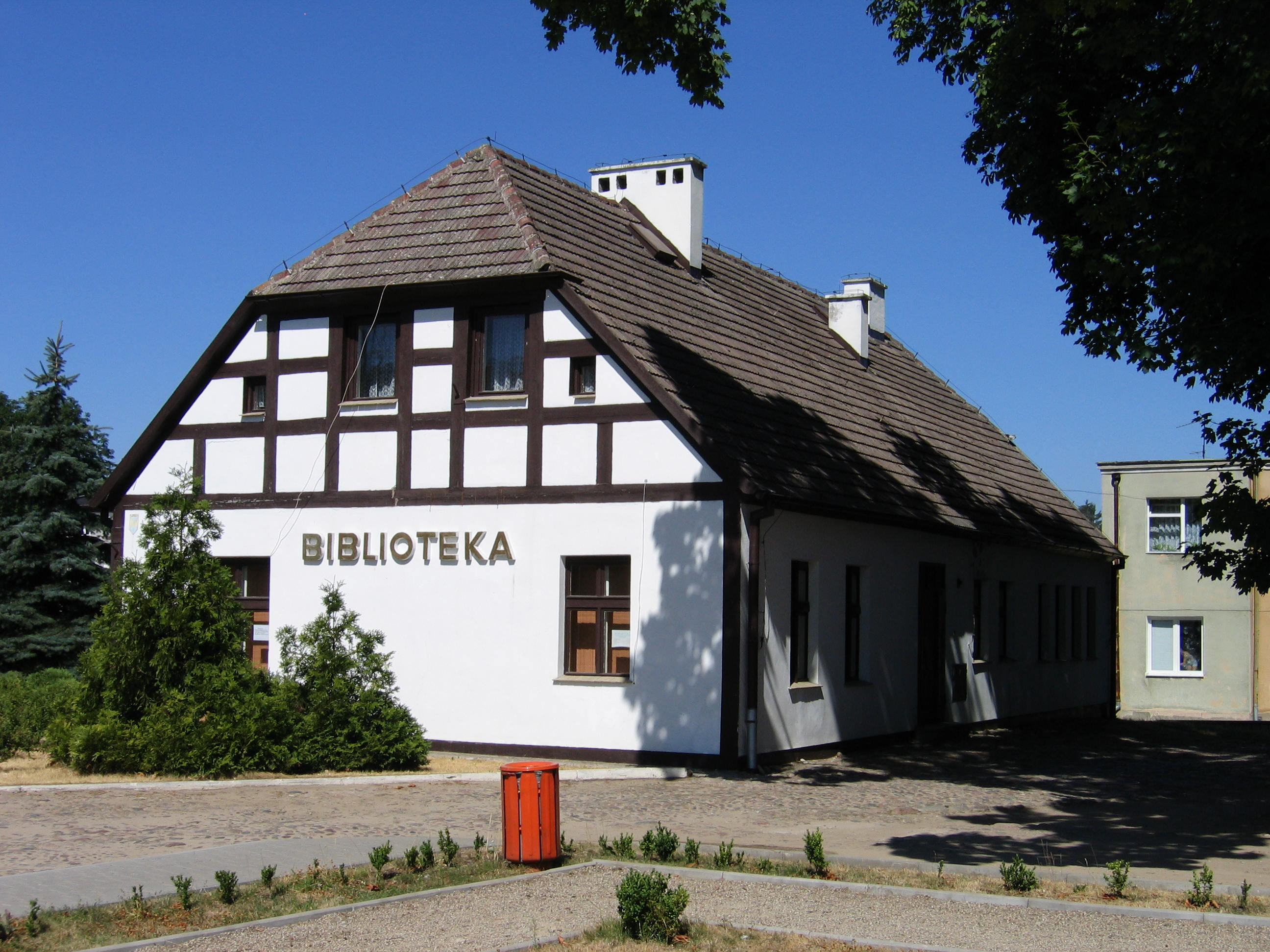
Library

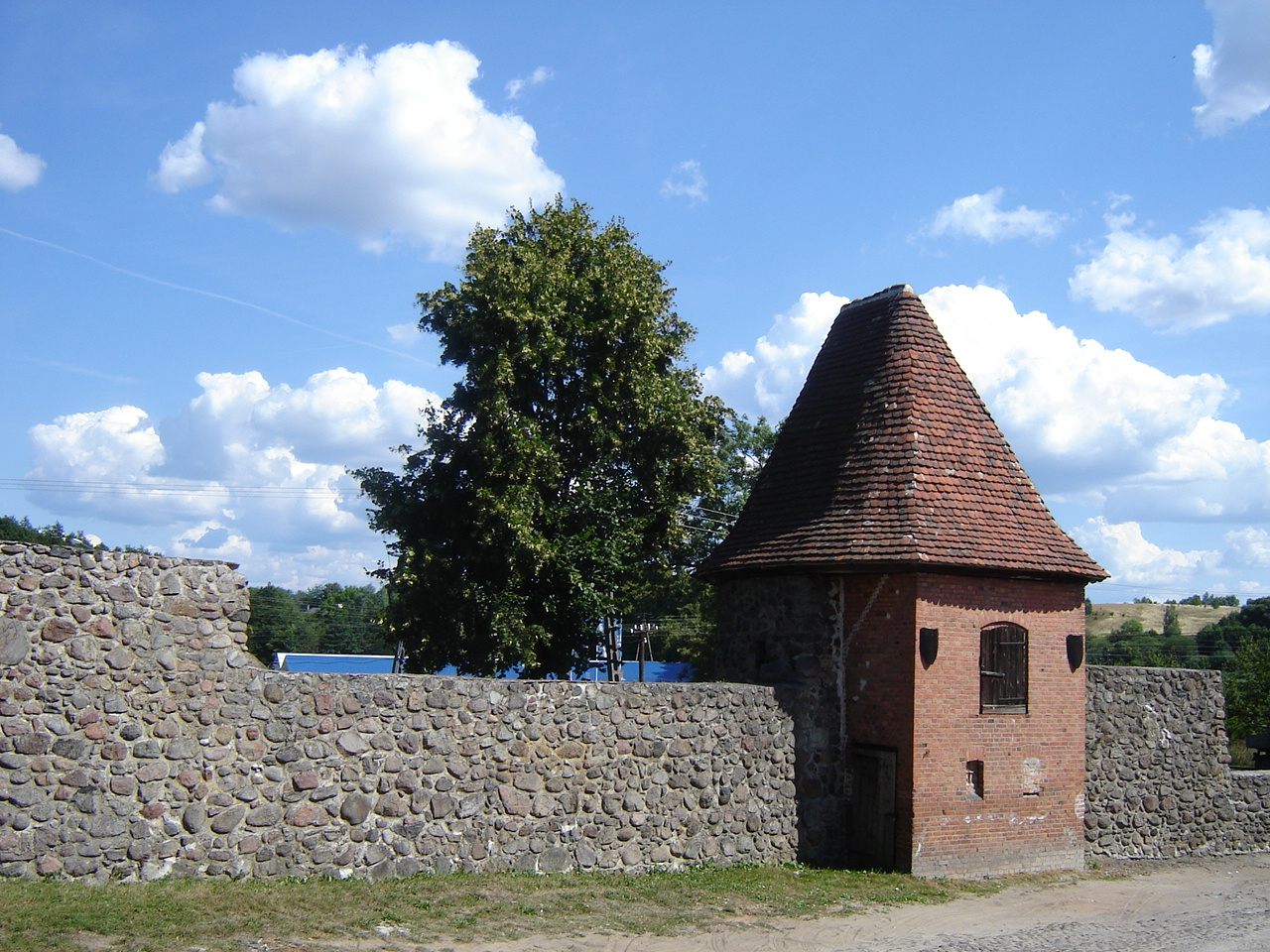
Defensive walls

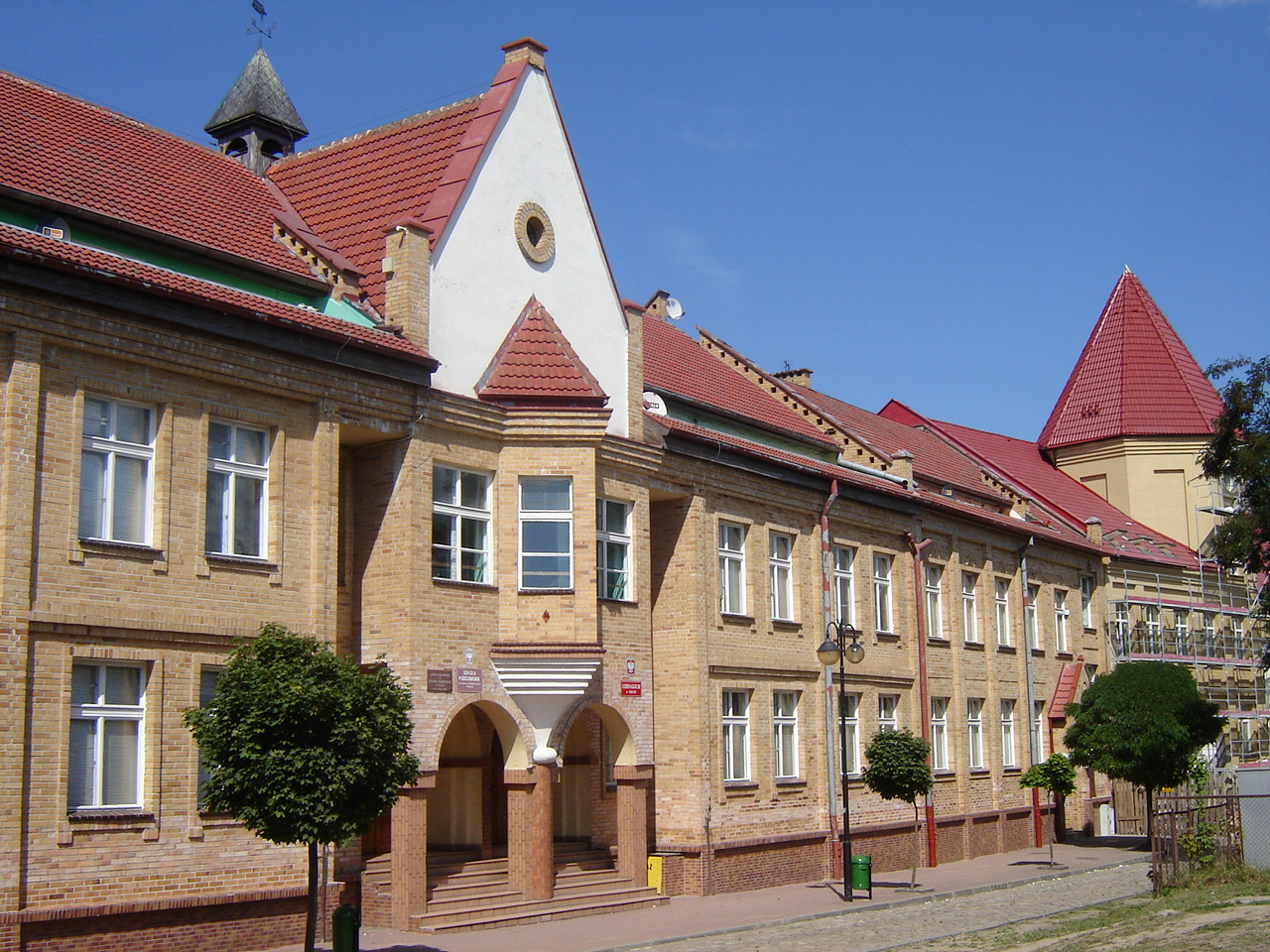
Elementary school

== Notable residents ==
- Daniel Cramer (Daniel Candidus) (1568–1637), German Lutheran theologian
- Franz Eisenach (1918–1998), Luftwaffe fighter ace
- Marie Schlei (1919–1983), German politician
