= Bobolice =

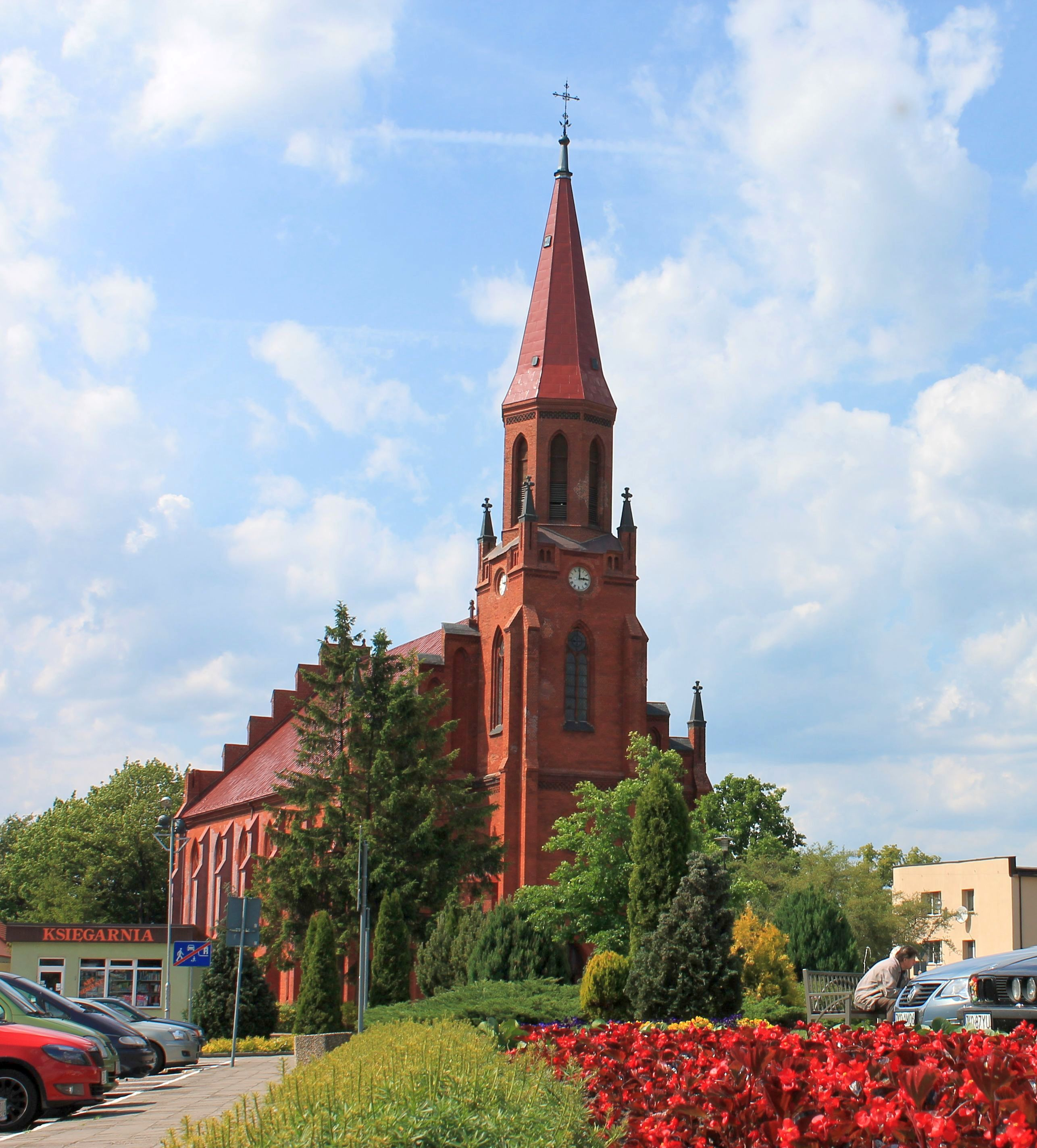
- Church of the Assumption of Mary in Bobolice

- Flag Coat of arms

- Location within Poland
- Coordinates: 53°57′N 16°35′E
- Country: Poland
- Voivodeship: West Pomeranian
- County: Koszalin
- Gmina: Bobolice
- Town rights: 1340

Government
  - Mayor: Mieczysława Brzoza

Area
  - Total: 4.77 km^{2} (1.84 sq mi)

Population (31 December 2021)
  - Total: 3,896
  - Density: 817/km^{2} (2,120/sq mi)
- Time zone: UTC+1 (CET)
  - Summer (DST): UTC+2 (CEST)
- Postal code: 76-020
- Area code: +48 94
- Car plates: ZKO
- Website: http://www.bobolice.pl/

Bobolice ([bɔbɔˈlʲit͡sɛ]; German: Bublitz) is a town in northwestern Poland, part of Koszalin County, West Pomeranian Voivodeship. As of December 2021, it has a population of 3,896.

== History ==
The territory became part of the emerging Polish state under its first ruler Mieszko I around 967. Following the fragmentation of Poland into smaller duchies, it formed part of the Duchy of Pomerania. In 1339 it became part of the Prince-Bishopric of Kamień. It was granted town rights in 1340. In 1370 it passed to the Teutonic Knights and in 1411 it was captured by Duke Bogislaw VIII and included within the Duchy of Słupsk, a vassal duchy of the Kingdom of Poland. From the 18th century it formed part of the Kingdom of Prussia, in 1807 it was occupied by France, and from 1871 to 1945 it was also part of Germany. During World War II, in 1945, a German-perpetrated death march of Allied prisoners-of-war from the Stalag XX-B POW camp passed through the town.

== Cuisine ==
The officially protected traditional food of Bobolice (as designated by the Ministry of Agriculture and Rural Development of Poland) is ser bałtycki ("Baltic cheese").

== Notable residents ==
- Paul Kleinschmidt (1883–1949), German painter and graphic artist
- Ré Soupault (1901–1996), German-French artist, photograph and journalist
- Hans-Jürgen Heise (1930–2013), German author and poet
