= Pomeranian Evangelical Church =

Former Protestant church in Germany

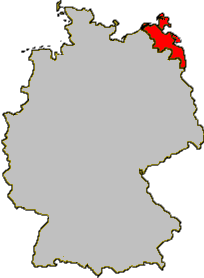
Ambit of the former Pomeranian Evangelical Church within Germany

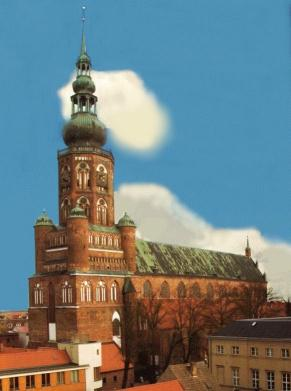
Dom Sanct Nicolai, Greifswald, preaching venue of the bishops of the former Pomeranian church body

The Pomeranian Evangelical Church (German: Pommersche Evangelische Kirche; PEK) was a Protestant regional church in the German state of Mecklenburg-Vorpommern, serving the citizens living in Hither Pomerania. The Pomeranian Evangelical Church was based on the teachings brought forward by Martin Luther and other Reformators during the Reformation. It combined Lutheran and Reformed traditions (Prussian Union). The seat of the church was Greifswald, the bishop's preaching venue was the former Collegiate Church of St. Nicholas in Greifswald.

In May 2012, the Pomeranian Evangelical Church merged with the North Elbian Evangelical Lutheran Church and the Evangelical Lutheran Church of Mecklenburg into the Evangelical Lutheran Church in Northern Germany. The Pomeranian Evangelical Church was a full member of the Protestant Church in Germany (Evangelische Kirche in Deutschland, EKD) between 1950 and 1969 and again from 1991 to 2012, and of the Evangelical Church of the Union between 1950 and 2003, and thereafter of the Union of Evangelical Churches. The church was also a member of the Community of Protestant Churches in Europe. Last bishop was Dr. Hans-Jürgen Abromeit since 2006.

== History ==
At the time of the Reformation Pomerania within the Holy Roman Empire (Duchy of Pomerania) consisted of three separate states, the two branch duchies of Pomerania-Stettin (capital: Stettin, renamed as Szczecin as of 1945) and Pomerania-Wolgast (capital: Wolgast) as well as of the secular principality (capital: Kolberg, renamed as Kołobrzeg as of 1945) ruled by the Prince-Bishops of Cammin, who – in Roman Catholic respect – presided over the exempt Roman Catholic Cammin diocese (seat: Cammin, renamed as Kamień Pomorski as of 1945) comprising all the prince-episcopal state, Pomerania-Stettin, parts of eastern Mecklenburg, the New March and much of Pomerania-Wolgast. The latter's island Rügen formed part of the Roman Catholic diocese of Roskilde, converted to Lutheranism by the Danish king in 1537, the northern mainland area of Pomerania-Wolgast formed part of the Diocese of Schwerin.

=== Reformation and formation of Lutheran state churches ===
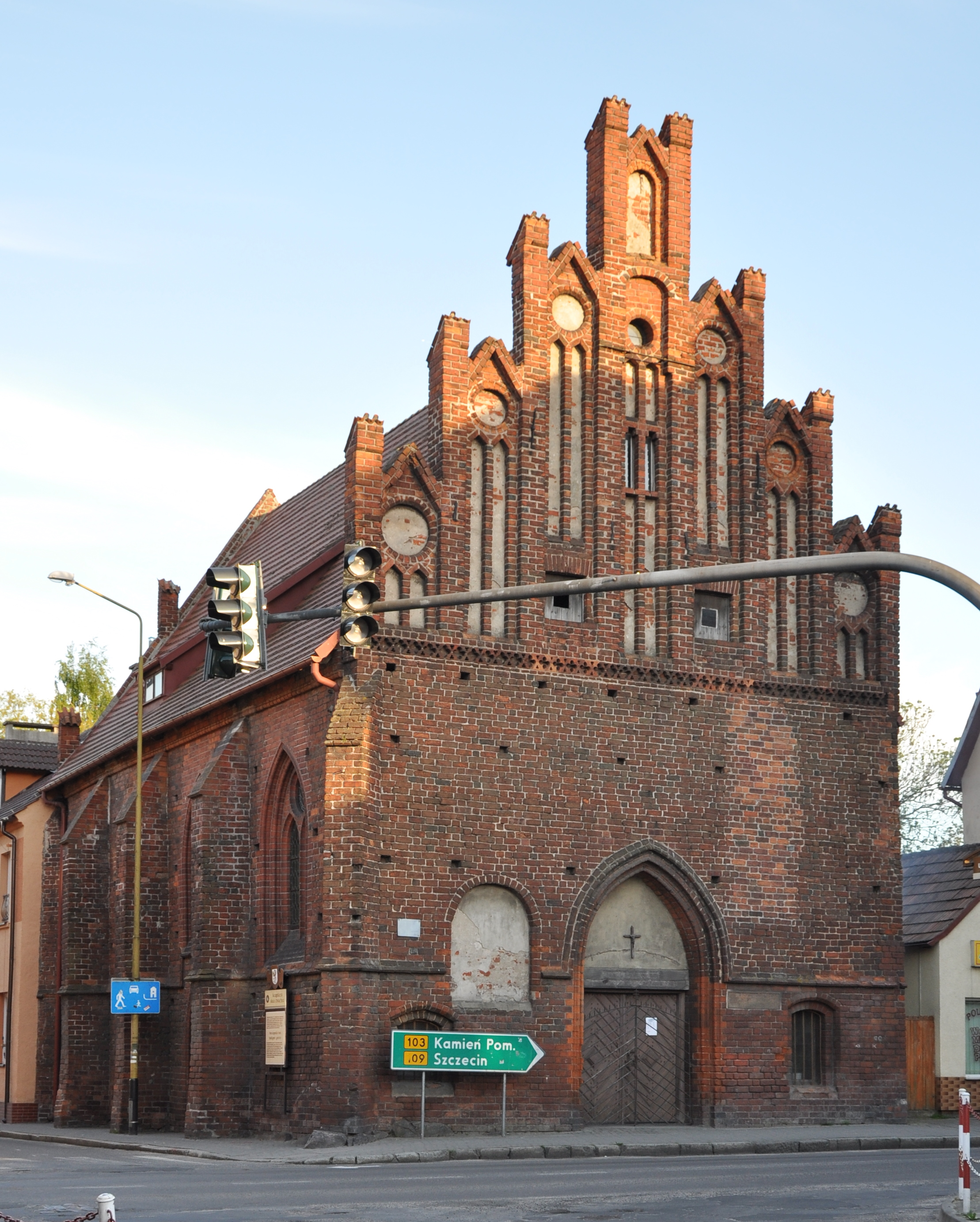
Holy Spirit Chapel, Treptow an der Rega, venue of the Pomeranian diet in 1534.

On 13 December 1534 the Pomeranian Common Diet in Treptow an der Rega voted in favour of the introduction of Lutheranism in the branch duchies, so in the subsequent years most congregations and parishioners in Cammin diocese converted to Lutheranism. Only in Cammin's prince-episcopal state Bishop Erasmus von Manteuffel-Arnhausen could defend the Catholic faith. In 1535 the first Lutheran church order (Kirchenordnung; church constitution) for Pomerania was designed by the famous Pomeranian Reformator Johannes Bugenhagen, also called Doctor Pomeranus, but was only implemented in 1563. In 1535 the two Pomeranian branch duchies, Pomerania-Wolgast and Pomerania-Stettin, each appointed its own spiritual leader (called general superintendent as of 1563), seated in Greifswald for Pomerania-Wolgast and in Stettin for western Pomerania-Stettin, and, however, subordinate to Stettin, in Stolp (renamed as Słupsk) as of 1945) with subsidiary competence for the eastern part of Pomerania-Stettin.

In 1544 the Cammin diocesan cathedral chapter elected Bartholomaeus Suawe as successor of Manteuffel, becoming the first Lutheran on the Cammin see, however, not confirmed by the Holy See. Suawe then introduced Lutheranism in the prince-episcopal state. His competence as spiritual Lutheran leader, however, was restricted to the prince-episcopal state (Hochstift), everywhere else in the former Cammin diocesan ambit superintendents, appointed by the respective ducal rulers, had taken Lutheran leadership. Protestantism had since been the prevailing Christian denomination in all of ducal and episcopal Pomerania.

The Lutheran churches in the three states of ducal and prince-episcopal Pomerania ranked as state churches. Temporary partitions without share in the Pomeranian governments, such as Pomerania-Barth (1569–1605; ecclesiastically under the general superintendent in Greifswald) and Pomerania-Rügenwalde (1569–1620; ecclesiastically under the superintendent in Stolp till 1604, then Stettin), had no effect on the structure of the two ducal state churches. The Administrators of Cammin prince-bishopric, elected in 1557 and later, lacked theological skills and did not serve as spiritual leaders of the prince-episcopal Lutheran state church any more, but superintendents (Stiftssuperintendenten; i.e. superintendent of the Hochstift) were appointed since 1558. In the same year the Cammin prince-bishopric also established a Lutheran consistory of its own. In 1556 Pomerania-Wolgast had established its own consistory (Greifswald Consistory). Its ambit comprised Pomerania north of the river Randow and west of the rivers Swine and Oder. Between 1575 and 1815 Stralsund, a city in Pomerania-Wolgast, maintained an own consistory for the Lutheran congregations within the city boundary.

During the Thirty Years' War (1618–1648) Pomerania fell under Swedish occupation. In 1625 the Wolgast ducal branch was extinct in the male line and bequeathed to Stettin. With the extinction of the Stettin line too in 1637 the electors of Brandenburg inherited Pomerania, however, inhibited by the Swedish occupants. In 1653, after quarrels and negotiations Sweden and Brandenburg partitioned ducal Pomerania into Swedish Pomerania (comprising former Pomerania-Wolgast and the west of former Pomerania-Stettin), and Brandenburgian Pomerania (comprising the former Cammin prince-bishopric and central and eastern parts of former Pomerania-Stettin).

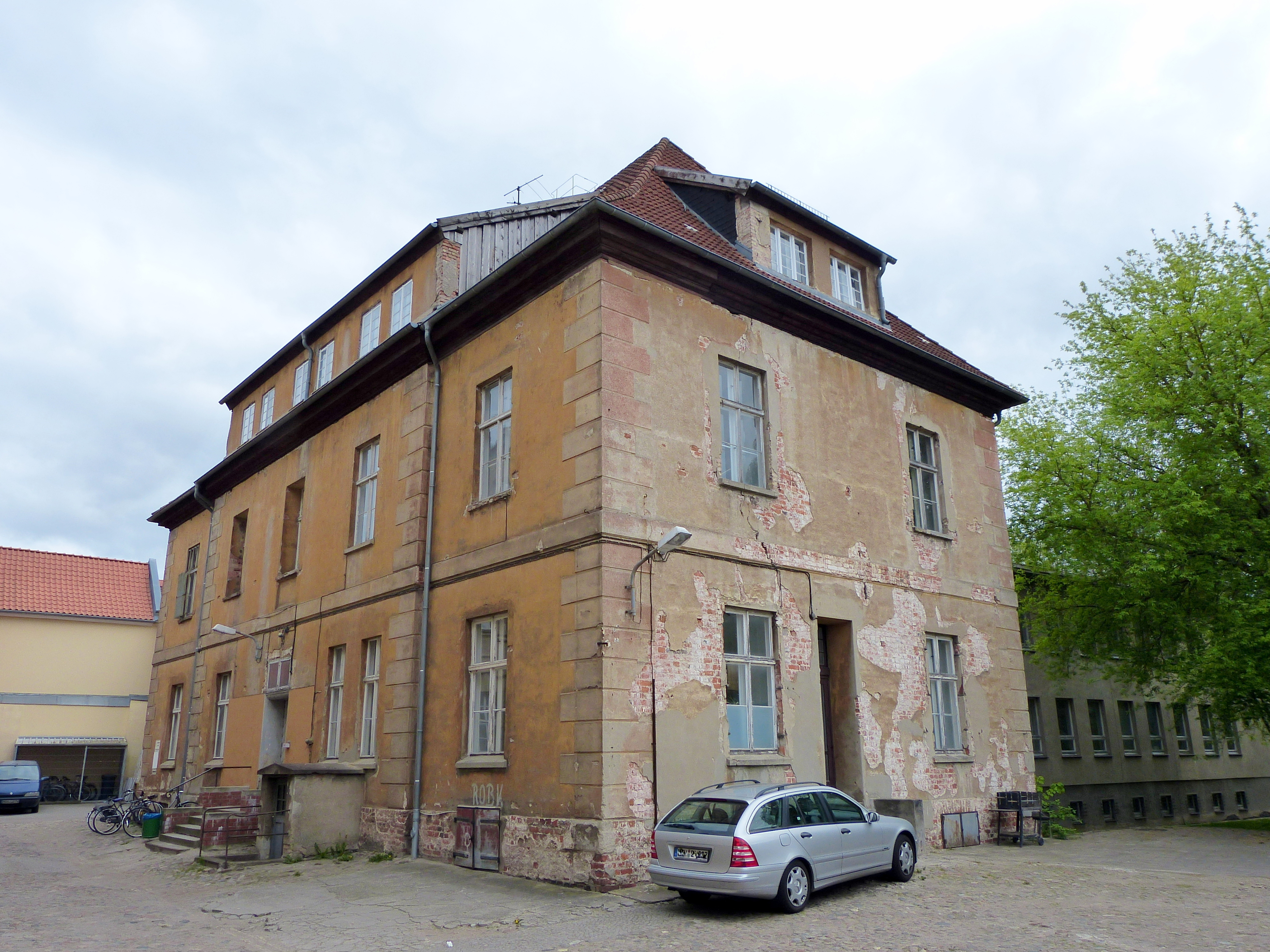
The former consistory in Greifswald, built 1708 to 1710.

As to the Lutheran state church of Swedish (Hither) Pomerania it took over the Wolgast-Pomeranian ecclesiastical institutions in Greifswald (consistory and general superintendency), whereas consistory and general superintendency in Stettin were closed down. The Lutheran state church of Brandenburgian (Farther) Pomerania reorganised Cammin's consistory as the Pomeranian and Cammin spiritual Consistory (till 1668 aka Kolberg Consistory) and took over the superintendency in Kolberg, elevated to general superintendency. The Pomeranian and Cammin spiritual Consistory, established as Cammin Consistory in 1558 in Cammin's capital Kolberg, was seated in that city (1558–1668, and again 1683–1686), in Stargard in Pomerania (1668–1683, and again 1686–1738) and afterwards in Stettin. With the Edict of Potsdam (1685) Huguenots founded Calvinist congregations in Stargard (1687), Stolp and Kolberg (1699). Swedish Pomerania did not allow the immigration of Calvinists.

After in 1713 Swedish Pomerania had ceded Stettin, in 1721 Calvinists founded a congregation there too. With the repeated cessions of Swedish Pomeranian territory to Brandenburgian Pomerania in the early 18th century also the ambit of the general superintendency in Greifswald shrank in favour of that for western Brandenburgian Pomerania. In 1738 the Pomeranian and Cammin spiritual Consistory moved to Stettin, however, due to the distance to remote eastern Farther Pomerania (the Hinterkreise; i.e. farther districts) it opened a subsidiary consistory for the east, the Farther Pomeranian Consistory of Köslin (aka Köslin Consistory) in 1747. In 1750 the new Superior Consistory in Berlin (Lutherisches Oberconsistorium zu Berlin) became the superior authority for all Lutheran church bodies in Brandenburg-Prussia. The few Reformed (or Calvinist) congregations in Pomerania became subject to the Reformed Church Directorate in Berlin (Reformierte Kirchen-Direction).

=== Ecclesiastical Province of Pomerania within the Prussian Union of churches ===
In 1815 Swedish Pomerania became a pawn in the hands of the powerful, Sweden ceded it to Denmark which passed it on to Prussia in exchange for Saxe-Lauenburg. Swedish Pomerania was renamed as New Hither Pomerania (Neuvorpommern). In 1817 the supreme governor of the Lutheran State Church and the Reformed State Church in Prussia, Frederick William III, initiated the merger of both churches to form the Evangelical Church in Prussia, avoiding in its name the terms Lutheran or Reformed. This new state church, an administratively united umbrella comprising Lutheran, Reformed (Calvinist) and United Protestant congregations, built up regional subdivisions, so-called ecclesiastical provinces (Kirchenprovinzen).

Its Ecclesiastical Province of Pomerania, comprising congregations within the borders of the Province of Pomerania, consisted of the Lutheran congregations within the state church of former Swedish Pomerania, of the Lutheran congregations previously subject to the Stettin general superintendent under the Lutheran Superior Consistory in Berlin, and of the Reformed (Calvinist) congregations located in Pomerania and previously subject to the Reformed Church Directorate in Berlin.

The King originally intended the merger of locally established Lutheran and Calvinist congregations into congregations of a United Protestant confession, and the adoption of the Union confession by all local congregations without an existing local partner of the other confession to merge with. His intention, however, failed due to strong Lutheran resistance throughout his monarchy, especially among Lutherans in Pomerania and Silesia.

This fight even caused the schism of the Old Lutherans. A number of Lutheran congregations refrained to join the new umbrella or seceded from it in the 1820s and 1830s, forming the independent Evangelical Lutheran Church in Prussia recognised in 1845, which was why the Evangelical Church in Prussia renamed as Evangelical State Church in Prussia (Evangelische Landeskirche in Preußen), indicating its privileged status. So finally the merger, not including all congregations, materialised as a mere administrative Union, including in Pomerania mostly Lutheran congregations, the traditionally prevailing denomination, and some few Reformed and United Protestant congregations.

Reformed congregations were usually found in cities or newly established or resettled villages in formerly Brandenburgian Pomerania, where Calvinist immigrants ensconced after 1685. United Protestant congregations usually emerged in cities, where Calvinists and Lutherans lived side by side and disliked the denominational split.

The ecclesiastical province had its headquarters, the 1815-founded Royal [or Evangelical (as of 1918)] Consistory of Pomerania Province and general superintendent, domiciling in Stettin, taken over from the Brandenburgian Pomeranian Lutheran Church, the latter's local Köslin Consistory had been dissolved in 1815. The Swedish Pomeranian former Greifswald Consistory and the local Stralsund Consistory were stripped of their competences and dissolved in 1849 and 1815, respectively, the general superintendency in Greifswald was not restaffed after 1824. Since initially the office of general superintendent was not provided as a function in the new Evangelical Church in Prussia at all, the respective offices had not been restaffed when their previous incumbents retired, causing a vacancy. However, since the late 1820s the Evangelical Church in Prussia appointed general superintendents in all its ecclesiastical provinces.

Bismarck's church reforms strengthened the autonomy and self-rule of the state church, which in 1875 renamed as Evangelical State Church of Prussia's older Provinces (Evangelische Landeskirche der älteren Provinzen Preußens), since in Prussian provinces annexed since 1866 their regional Protestant church bodies had remained independent of the Evangelical State Church of Prussia. The reform laws strengthened the parishioners' participation through elected presbyteries and provincial synods in matters of the Ecclesiastical Province of Pomerania. In 1892 the Consistory of Pomerania Province moved into its new building on Elisabethstraße (today's ulica Kaszubska in Szczecin). With the end of the monarchic summepiscopacy the church lost its status as state church and assumed independence. With its new church order and name, Evangelical Church of the old-Prussian Union (as of 1922, Evangelische Kirche der altpreußischen Union; APU), it accounted for these changes.

The parishioners in the congregations elected synodals for their respective provincial synod – the legislative body – which again elected its governing board the provincial church council (Provinzialkirchenrat), which also included members delegated by the Evangelical Consistory of Pomerania Province. The consistory was the provincial administrative body, whose members were appointed by the Evangelical Supreme Church Council in Berlin, the central administrative body of the old-Prussian Union church. The consistory was chaired by the Stettin general superintendent, being the ecclesiastical, and a consistorial president (German: Konsistorialpräsident), being the administrative leader. In 1921 the Ecclesiastical Province of Pomerania was divided into two general superintendencies (Westsprengel and Ostsprengel), the western ambit seated again in Greifswald, the eastern ambit in Stettin. The provincial synods and the provincial church councils elected from their midst the Pomeranian synodals for the general synod, the legislative body of the overall Evangelical Church of the old-Prussian Union. In 1927 the general synod of the old-Prussian Union church legislated in favour of the ordination of women.

With the Nazi-imposed premature reelection of presbyteries and synods within the old-Prussian church in July 1933 the Nazi-submissive Protestant movement of German Christians gained majorities in most Pomeranian presbyteries and the Pomeranian provincial synod, like in most old-Prussian ecclesiastical provinces. In June 1933 the Nazi government of Prussia, ignoring religious autonomy, furloughed the then incumbent general superintendent Walter Kähler (western district, seated in Greifswald), whereas his colleague Paul Kalmus (eastern district, seated in Stettin) retired in October the same year. This allowed the German Christians, dominating the provincial synod, to install their proponent Karl Thom as provincial bishop (Provinzialbischof), combining the ambits of Westsprengel and Ostsprengel, self-aggrandising as Bishop of Cammin, claiming Führerprinzip-like authority over all the provincial clergy.

Especially among the many Pomeranian rural Pietists the opposition, forming the Confessing Church movement, found considerable support. Due to the Nazi regime's interference causing the violation and de facto abolition of the church order, new bodies emerged such as the provincial bishop (as of 1933) and the provincial ecclesiastical committee (Provinzialkirchenausschuss) since 1935 (dissolved in 1937, presided over by Karl von Scheven, a member of the Emergency Covenant of Pastors of the Confessing Church), depriving the extremist Thom of his power again in 1936. The provincial ecclesiastical committee provided for the ignoration of Thom, so that the constitutional two general superintendencies could be restaffed. In 1941, following the incorporation of Posen-West Prussia into Pomerania (1938), also the Ecclesiastical Province of Posen-West Prussia was dissolved and its ambit became a part of the Ecclesiastical Province of Pomerania. In 1941 about two million of the Pomeranians, then amounting to 2.394 million inhabitants, were parishioners of the Pomeranian ecclesiastical province.

On 22 December 1941 the official new umbrella, the pan-German Evangelical Church, called for suited actions by all Protestant church bodies to withhold baptised non-Aryans from all spheres of Protestant church life. Many German Christian-dominated congregations followed suit, whereas confessing congregations in the Ecclesiastical Province of Pomerania dared to hand in lists of signatures in protest against the exclusion of the stigmatised Protestants of Jewish descent.

By the East Pomeranian Offensive, February–April 1945, the Red Army advanced so speedily, that there was hardly a chance to rescue refugees, let alone archives of congregations in Farther Pomerania, as was recorded in a report about the situation in the ecclesiastical provinces (10 March 1945). By the end of the war hundred thousands of parishioners and hundreds of pastors were fleeing westwards. The Ecclesiastical Province of Pomerania tried to relocate its Stettin-based institutions, the consistory, general superintendency, and pertaining offices, to Greifswald. Between April and July 1945 the Soviets handed over all of Pomerania on both banks along the Oder and east thereof to Poland. Thus the east district (Ostsprengel) dropped into dissolution. With the simultaneous atrocities against and expulsion of the remaining Pomeranians and the systematic suppression of any kind of their organisations and associations the church life in Polish-annexed Pomerania came to an end. Chattel, such as archives and files of the ecclesiastical province and the congregations, could only be partially rescued to places in the west ambit. In August 1945 the three Allies of Potsdam approved these facts and agreed to house and feed the destitute Pomeranians expelled to their zones of occupation.

On the occasion of the first meeting of representatives of Germany's persisting Protestant church bodies in Treysa (a part of today's Schwalmstadt) on 31 August 1945, the representatives of the six surviving old-Prussian ecclesiastical provinces (March of Brandenburg, Pomerania, Rhineland, Saxony, Silesia, and Westphalia) and the central Evangelical Supreme Church Council took fundamental decisions about the future of the Evangelical Church of the old-Prussian Union. They decided to assume the independent existence of each ecclesiastical province as Landeskirche (Protestant regional church body) and to reform the Evangelical Church of the old-Prussian Union into a mere umbrella organisation ("Neuordnung der Evangelischen Kirche der altpreußischen Union"). In Treysa the representatives of all Protestant church bodies from Germany founded a new umbrella, the Protestant Church in Germany (EKD).

Most of the parishioners remaining in Polish-annexed Pomerania Province were expelled by Poland in the post-war period of expulsion of Germans between 1945 and 1948. With most of the territory, formerly comprised by the eastern ambit (Ostsprengel) of the Ecclesiastical Province of Pomerania, transferred to Poland, it expropriated all church property there, parochial and provincial alike, without compensation, with the church buildings mostly taken over by the Roman Catholic Church, and most Protestant cemeteries desecrated and devastated. The provincial church institutions were built up anew in Greifswald, while the Soviets handed over Stettin, the former seat, to Poland in July 1945.

The majority of the 1.5 million fled and expelled Pomeranian parishioners found refuge outside of the remaining territory of the Ecclesiastical Province of Pomerania and thus joined congregations within other Protestant regional church bodies, about 70,000 parishioners perished through war, flight and expulsion. But many stranded also in the west ambit (Westsprengel) with its original 500,000 inhabitants. The situation turned severe with a massive shortage of food and lodgement. However, since the Soviets had decided to keep most of Hither Pomerania, which included the Westsprengel, as part of their occupation zone refugees from Hither Pomerania, fled from there from March to May 1945, could return afterwards and congregational and provincial ecclesiastical structures were rebuilt. However, the position of general superintendent remained vacant after 1945. In October 1946 the 20th Pomeranian provincial synod elected Scheven general superintendent, and allowed him to adopt the new title of bishop.

=== Pomeranian Evangelical Church ===
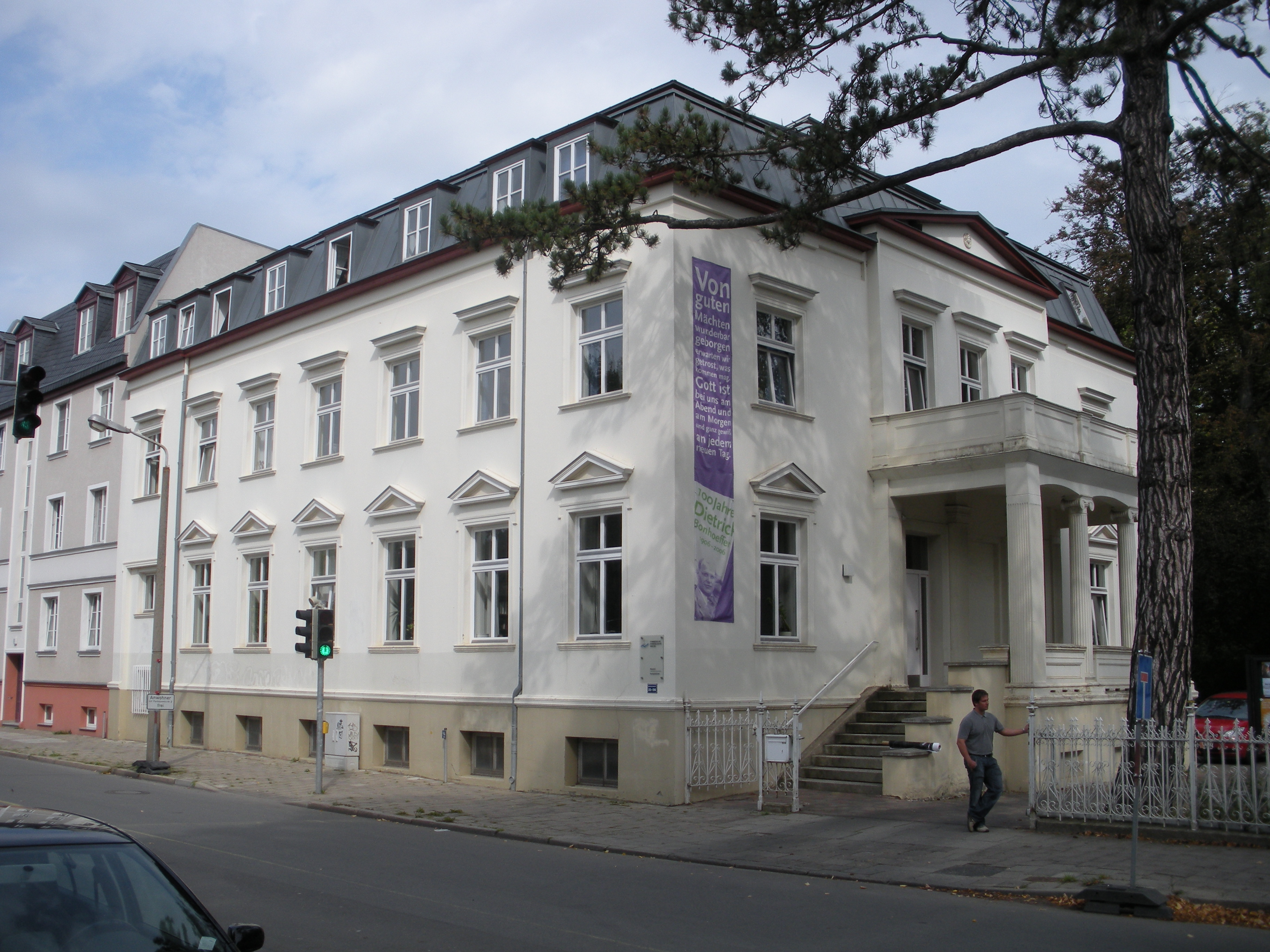
The Evangelical Greifswald Consistory of the Pomeranian Evangelical Church

The 20th Pomeranian provincial synod, 9–11 October 1946, had also decided to develop a new church order in order to reconstitute the Ecclesiastical Province of Pomerania as an independent regional Protestant church body. On 2 June 1950 the Pomeranian provincial synod adopted the prepared new church order and thus established the Pomeranian Evangelical Church, territorially comprising those parts of the former ecclesiastical province located in then East Germany (German Democratic Republic, GDR). By its new constitution its spiritual leader, titled bishop since late 1946, would continue to use that title. The Pomeranian Evangelical Church became a full member of the Protestant Church in Germany and between 1950 and 2003 was a full member of the Evangelical Church of the old-Prussian Union, now a mere umbrella. Under communist pressure the Evangelical Church of the old-Prussian Union had to skip the term Prussian from its name and renamed as Evangelical Church of the Union (Evangelische Kirche der Union; EKU) on its general synod in December 1953. In 1956 the Pomeranian church counted 720,000 parishioners, about one third of them with refugee background.

==== Evangelical Church in Greifswald ====
Following the second constitution of the GDR, enacted on April 9, 1968, and accounting for its de facto transformation into a communist dictatorship, the Council of Ministers of the GDR demoted all church bodies from statutory "Public-law Corporations" (German: Körperschaft des öffentlichen Rechts) to mere "Civil Associations". Thus the council could force the Pomeranian Evangelical Church to remove the term Pomerania from its name, because East German propaganda silenced about all terms recalling former German territory annexed by Poland or the Soviet Union. The church body then chose the new name Evangelical Church in Greifswald.

Along with the status as "Public-law Corporation" the new GDR constitution did away with the church tax, automatically collecting parishioners' contributions as a surcharge on the income tax. Now parishioners had to fix the level of their contributions and to transfer them again and again on their own. This together with ongoing discrimination of church members, which let many secede from the church, effectively eroded the adherence of parishioners and the financial situation of the Evangelical Church in Greifswald. In 1969 the church body, like all its East German fellows, seceded from the umbrella Protestant Church in Germany and joined the Federation of Protestant Churches within the GDR.

==== Pomeranian Evangelical Church from 1990 to 2012 ====
In 1990, after the end of the GDR dictatorship, the church body returned to its former name. With the dissolution of the GDR-Federation of Protestant Churches in 1991 the Pomeranian Evangelical Church reentered the EKD and remained its member until the merger in 2012. The blessing of same-sex unions was allowed. The number of parishioners continued to sink and reached 140,000 in 1997, somewhat more than 20% of the Hither Pomeranian population. On 28 March 2009 the synod voted in the merger with the two Lutheran church bodies of Mecklenburg and North Elbia, by 44 out of 58 synodals. The merger took effect on Pentecost, 27 May 2012.

== Number of parishioners ==
Pomeranian parishioners (Pop.)
Year	Pop.	±%
1905	1,616,550	—
1925	1,787,691	+10.6%
1941	2,014,536	+12.7%
1956	720,000	−64.3%
1985	400,000	−44.4%
1994	160,000	−60.0%
1997	140,000	−12.5%
2010	94,119	−32.8%
Note: In 1939 Posen-West Prussia ecclesiastical province was absorbed. Note: As of 1945 c. 1.5 million parishioners were exiled, many outside Pomerania, c. 70,000 perished Source: See footnote

== Governors, governing bodies and chairpersons of the church ==
Historically the church was subdivided into districts (later called Sprengel in German), partially due to different secular rulers reigning different parts of Pomerania, or partially due to the mere extension of the territory. Thus originally these districts territorially resembled the political subdivisions of Pomerania at the time. Each ecclesiastical district had a consistory and a spiritual leader (usually called general superintendent). At times there were additional subordinate consistories and spiritual leaders with regional competence.

=== Supreme governors (1534–1918) ===
Between 1534 and 1918 the incumbents of the different Pomeranian thrones were simultaneously Supreme Governors (summus episcopus) of the State Church, like the English monarch as Supreme Governor of the Church of England. Since 1532 the ducal House of Griffins was divided into two lines, ruling in partitioned parts of the duchy (Pomerania-Stettin 1532–1637; Pomerania-Wolgast 1532–1620). Furthermore, the third political unit was the Prince-Bishopric of Cammin (1248–1650), a prince-bishopric in parts of Farther Pomerania, ruled by Catholic and later Lutheran bishops of Cammin or by administrators elected by its governing body, the collegial cathedral chapter of Cammin, since the Reformation mostly staffed with Lutheran capitular canons.

Two dependent branch duchies, Pomerania-Barth (1569–1605) and Pomerania-Rügenwalde (1569–1620) were without share in the government, thus also without competence as to the Lutheran state churches. After the extinction of the Griffins in 1637 Pomerania was divided into a Swedish and a Brandenburgian part, where the monarchs of Sweden and the Berlin-based Hohenzollern rulers, respectively, then wielded the summepiscopacy.

==== State Church in Pomerania-Wolgast (1534–1648) ====
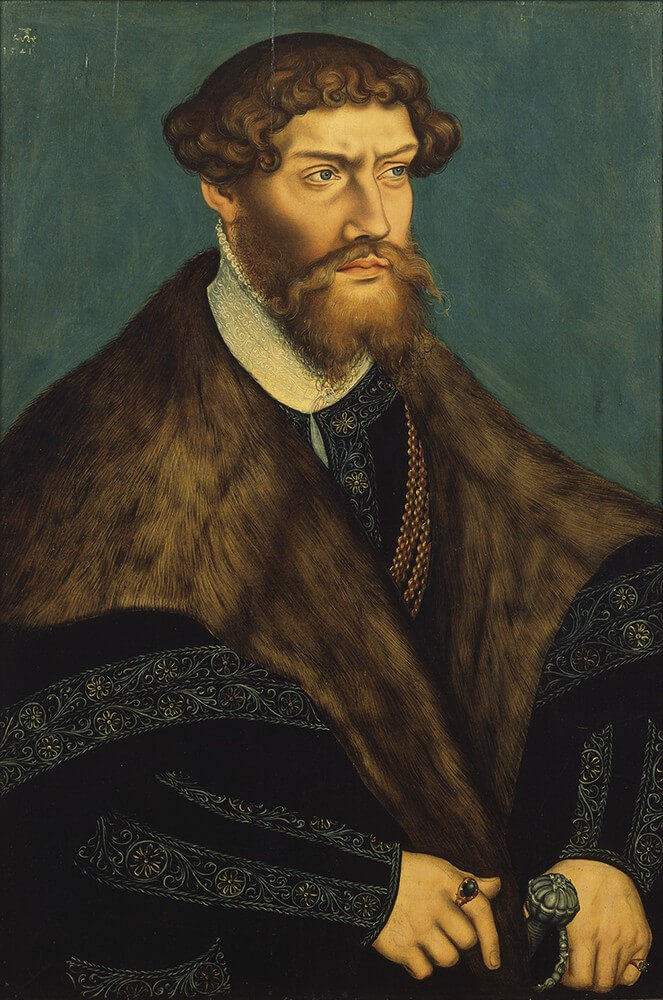
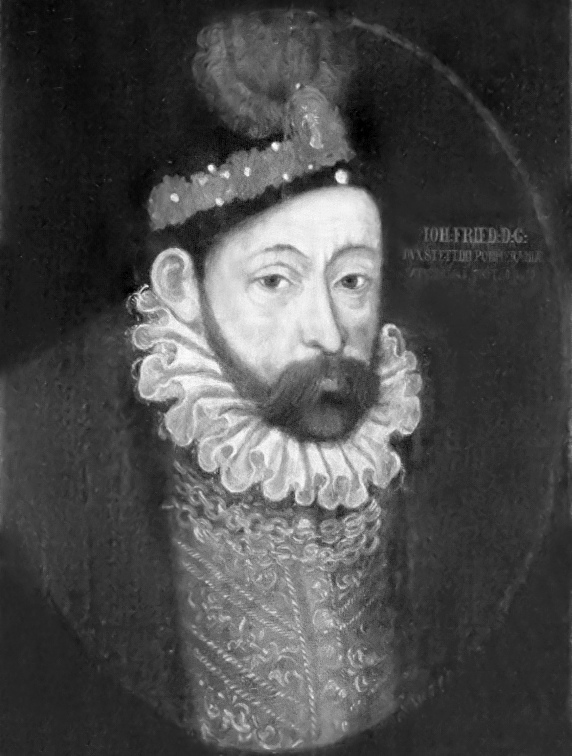
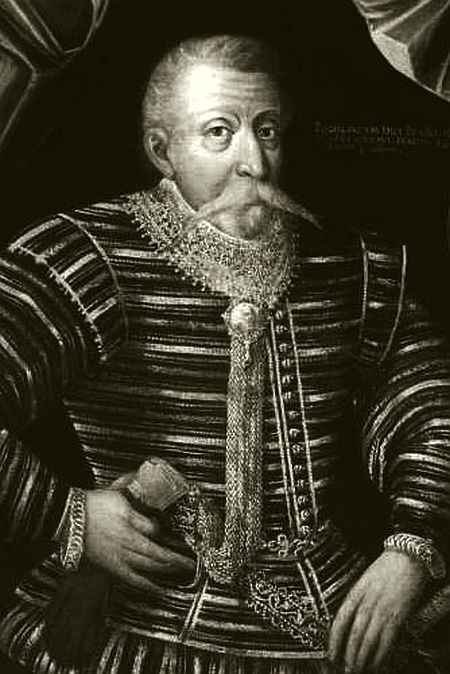
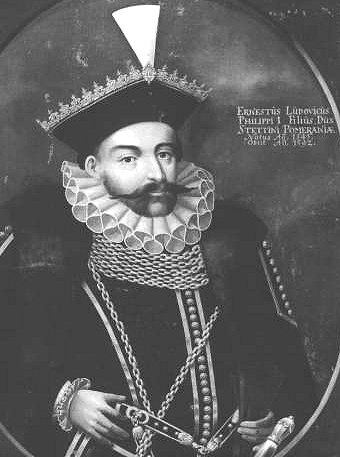
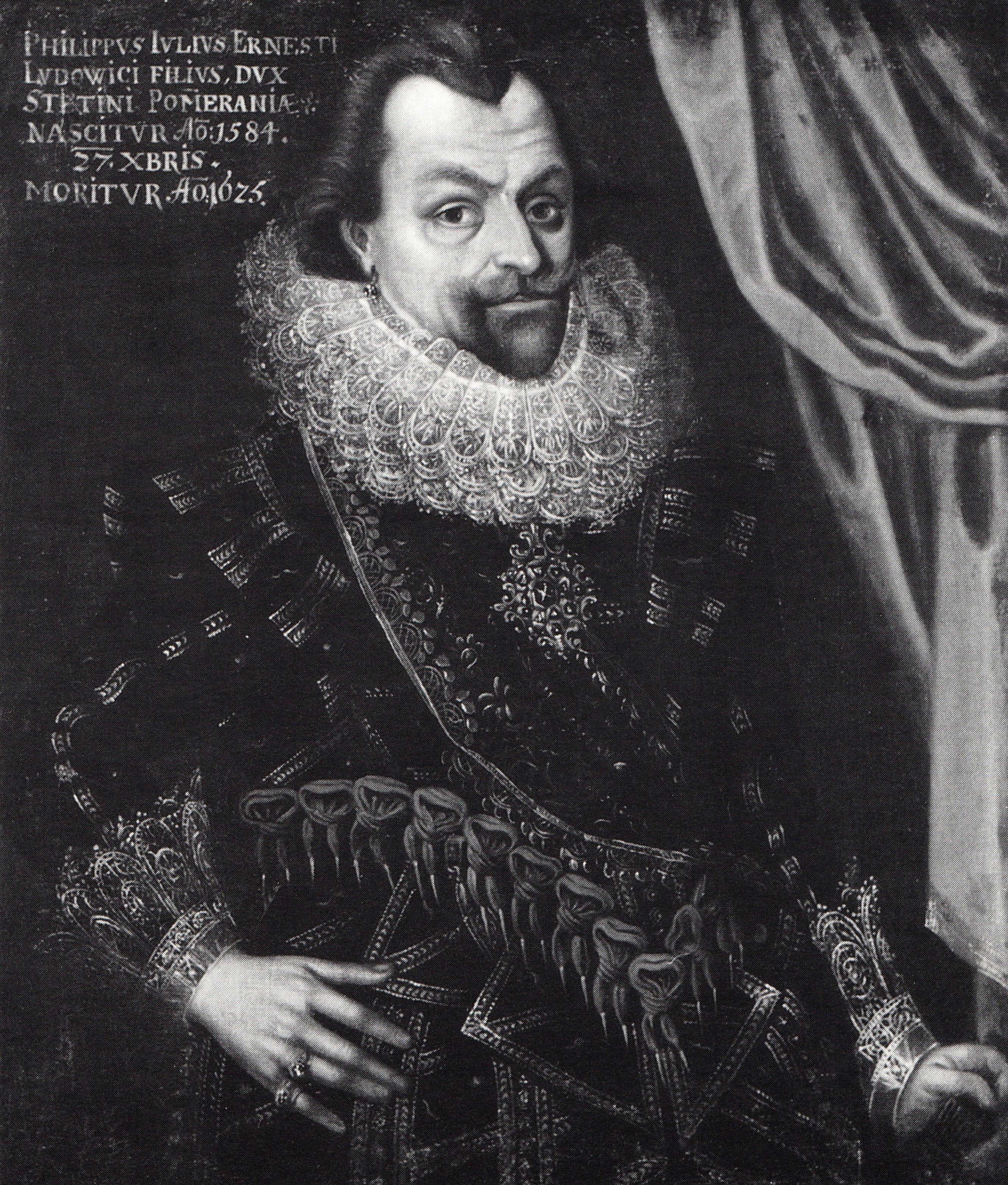
The dukes of Pomerania-Wolgast were supreme governors of the Lutheran state church in their branch duchy, including dependent Pomerania-Barth (1569–1605).
Term	Image	Name
1531– 1560		Philip I, co-ruling duke in Pomerania, as of 1532 only in Pomerania-Wolgast
1560– 1569, 1560– 1569, 1560– 1569, and 1560– 1592		John Frederick with his brothers Barnim X (no image), Bogislaw XIII and Ernest Louis, as dukes regnant in Wolgast
1592– 1625		Philip Julius
With Philip Julius' childless death Pomerania-Wolgast was bequeathed to Stettin in 1625.
1637– 1648	vacancy, Swedish occupation
Former Pomerania-Wolgast increased by western parts of Pomerania-Stettin became Swedish Pomerania in 1648.

==== State Church in Pomerania-Stettin (1534–1648) ====
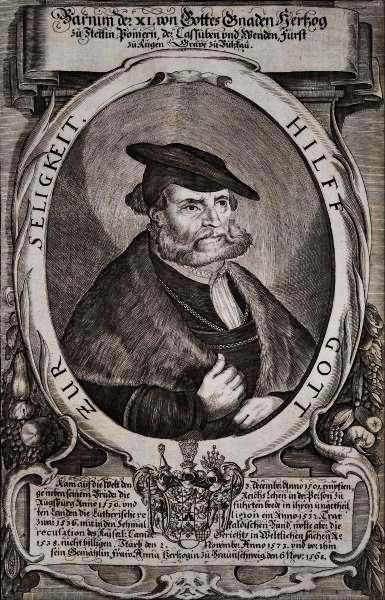
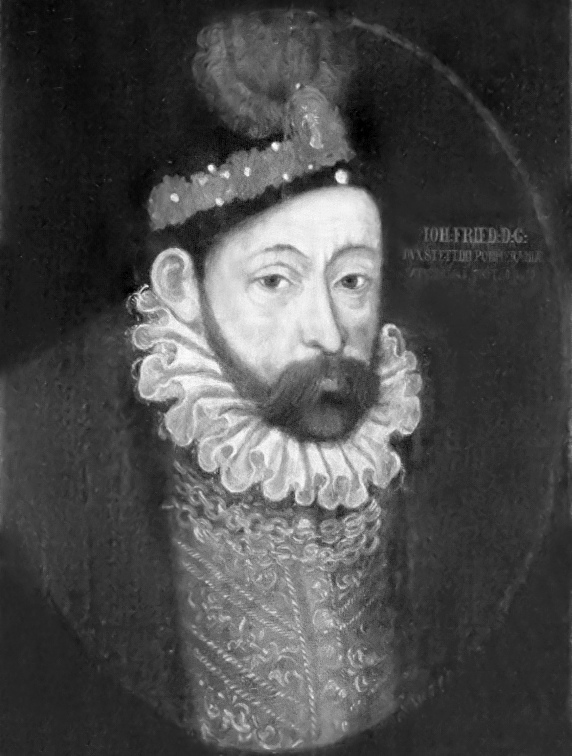
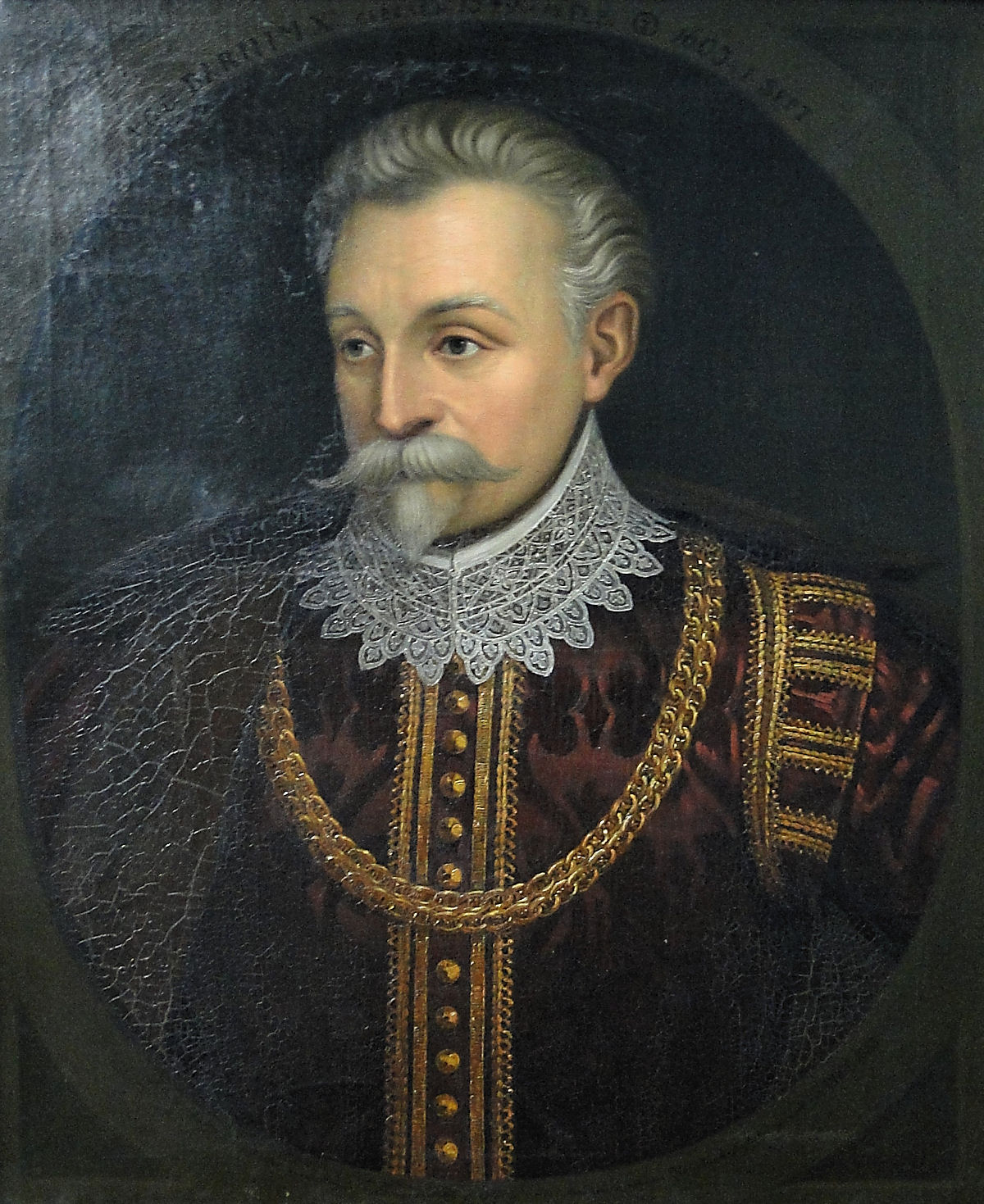
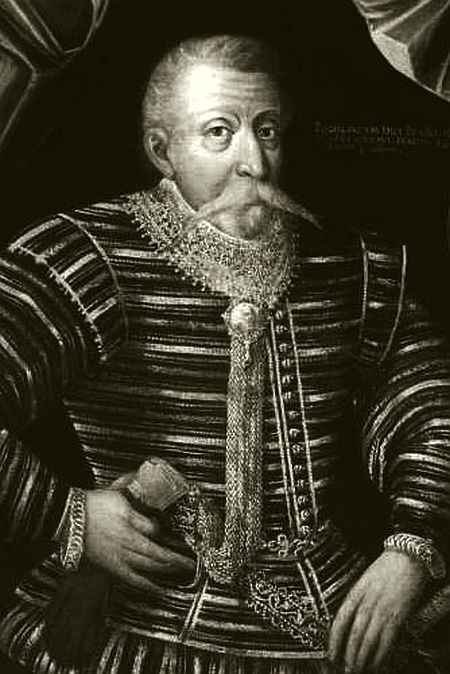
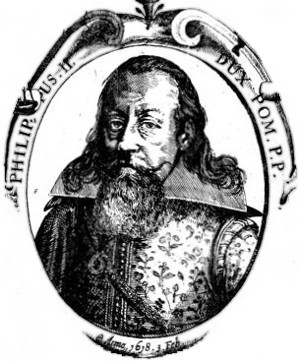
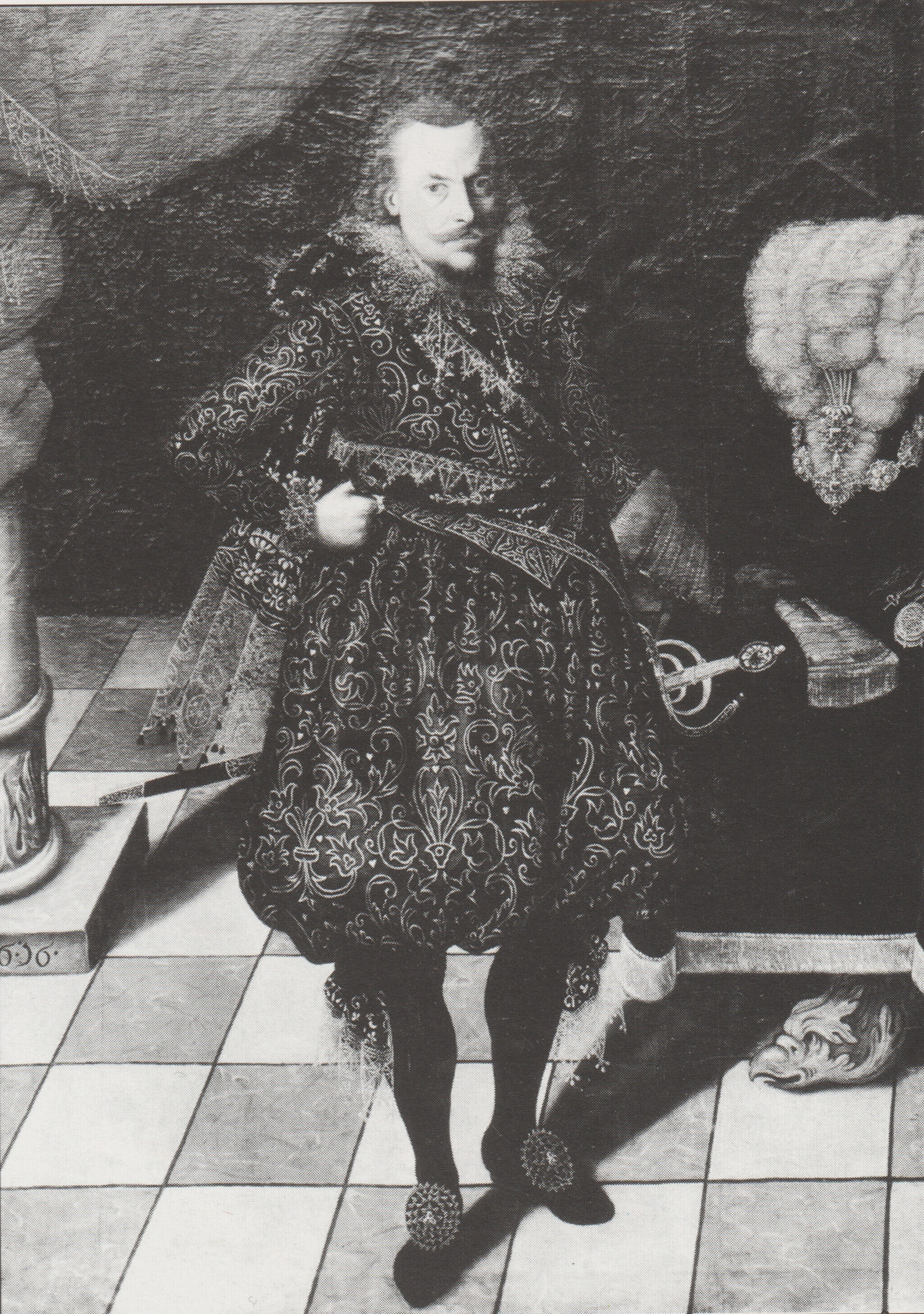
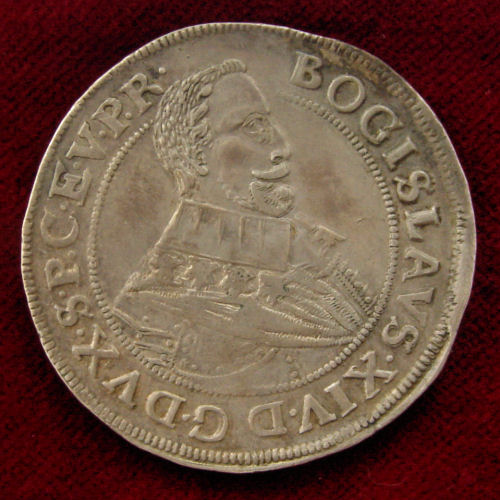
The Stettin dukes were supreme governors of the Lutheran state church in their branch duchy, including dependent Pomerania-Rügenwalde (1569–1620).
Term	Image	Name
1523– 1569		Barnim XI, co-ruling duke in Pomerania, as of 1532 only in partitioned Pomerania-Stettin
1569– 1600		John Frederick, as duke regnant in Stettin
1600– 1603		Barnim XII
1603– 1606		Bogislaw XIII, as duke regnant in Stettin
1606– 1618		Philip II
1618– 1620		Francis, as duke regnant, before administrator of Cammin prince-bishopric
1620– 1637		Bogislaw XIV, as duke regnant in Stettin, inherited Wolgast in 1625
1637– 1648	vacancy, disputes between Brandenburg and Sweden, both claiming Pomerania
Former Pomerania-Stettin was partitioned between Brandenburgian (centre and east) and Swedish Pomerania (west) with Stettin until 1713, then ceded to the former.

==== State Church in Cammin Prince-bishopric (1544–1650) ====
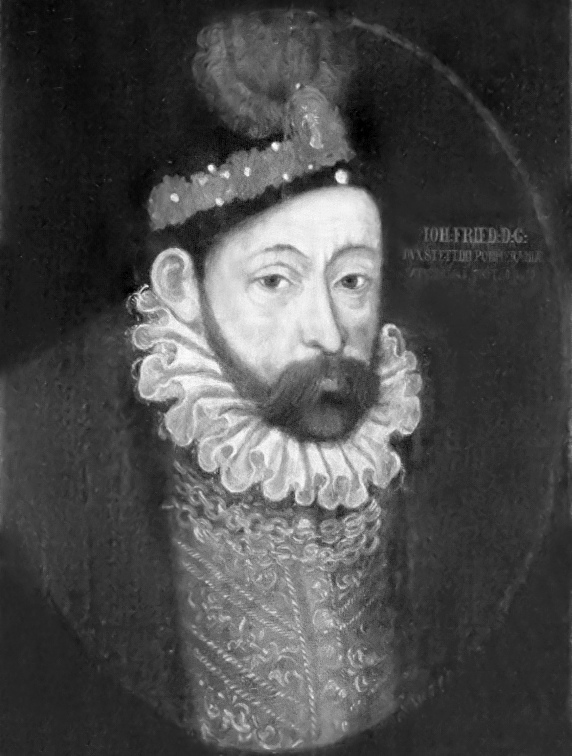
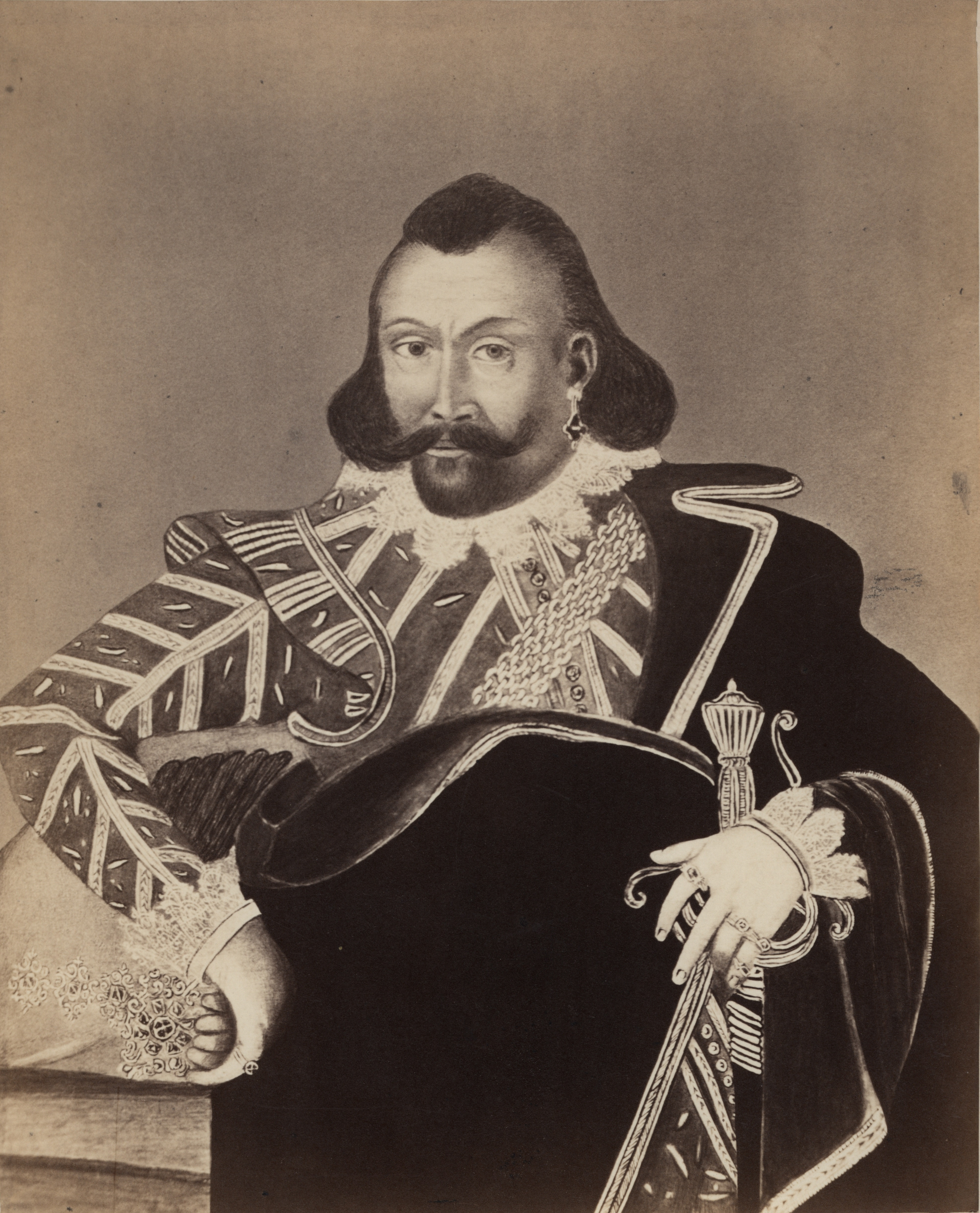
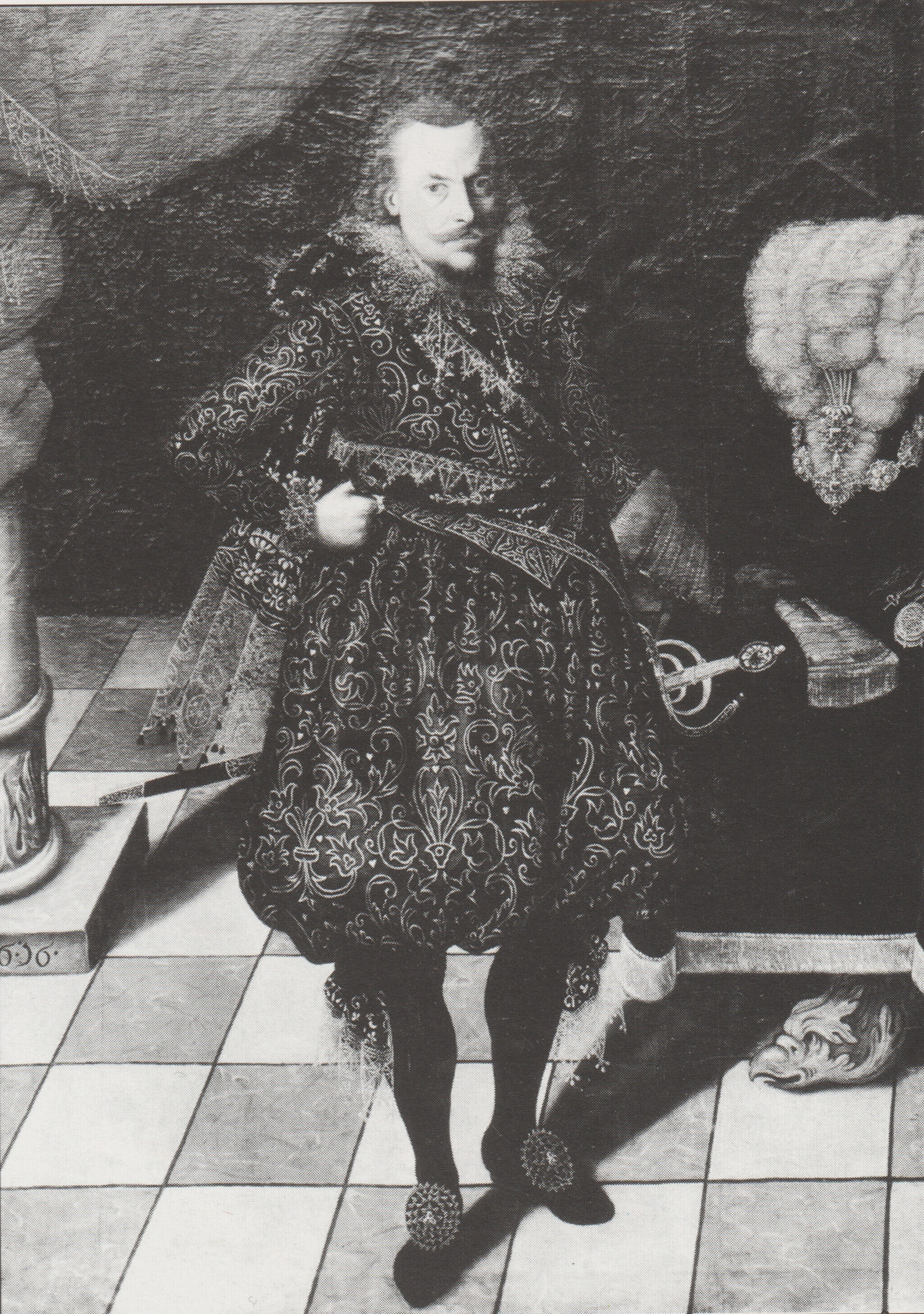
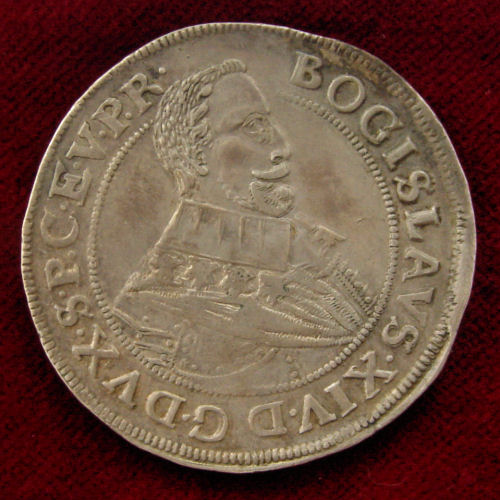
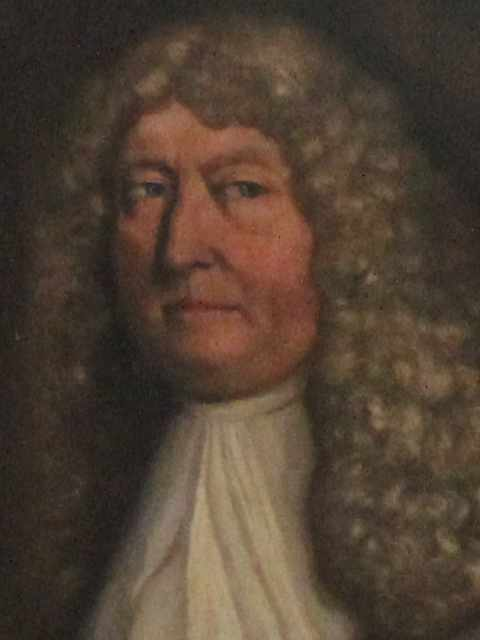
The Lutheran bishops of Cammin were simultaneously spiritual leaders and supreme governors of the Lutheran state church. Since 1557 Administrators (colloquially bishops), succeeded in ruling the prince-bishopric and as supreme governors of its church. As its spiritual leaders served superintendents since 1558.
Term	Image	Name
1544– 1549		Bartholomaeus Suawe, Prince-Bishop of Cammin, the first of Lutheran faith
1549– 1556		Martin Weiher, last prince-bishop with theological skills
1557– 1574		John Frederick, as administrator regnant, resigned in favour of his youngest brother Casimir
1574– 1602		Casimir VI, as administrator regnant
1602– 1618		Francis, as administrator regnant, resigned in order to become duke in Stettin in 1618
1618– 1622		Ulrich, as administrator regnant
1623– 1637		Bogislaw XIV, as administrator regnant
1637– 1650		Ernst Bogislaw von Croÿ, as administrator regnant
In 1650 Brandenburg seized Cammin prince-bishopric. Its church and that in partitioned eastern Pomerania-Stettin (Farther Pomerania) merged in the Lutheran state church of Brandenburgian Pomerania.

==== State Church of Swedish Pomerania (1648–1815) ====
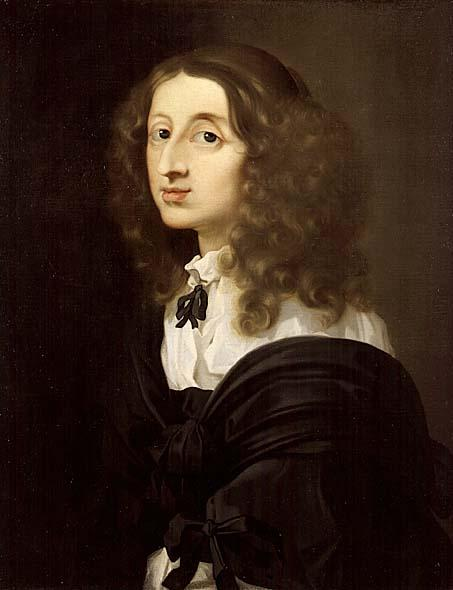
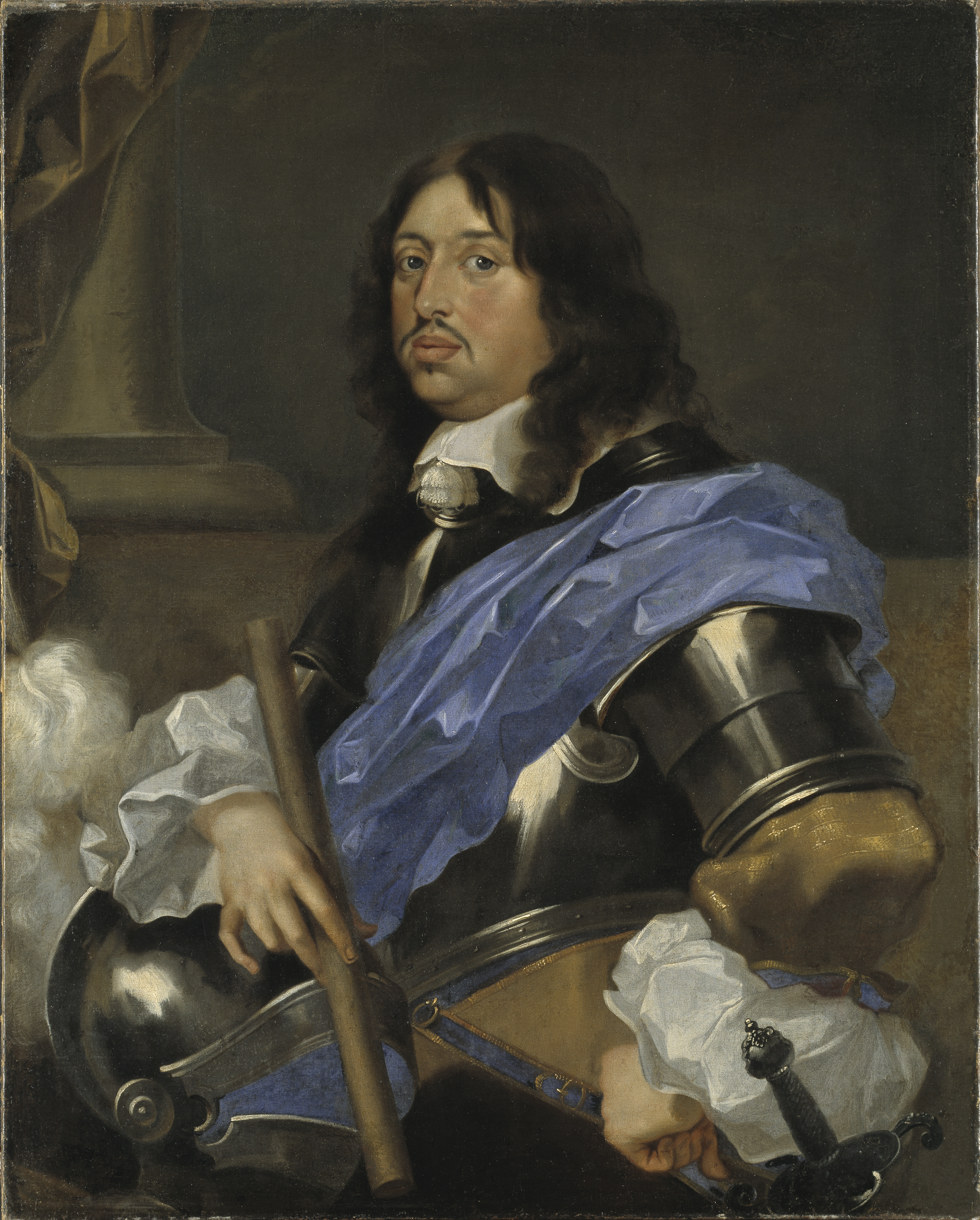
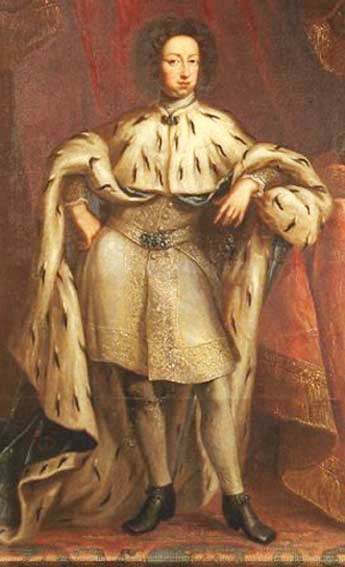
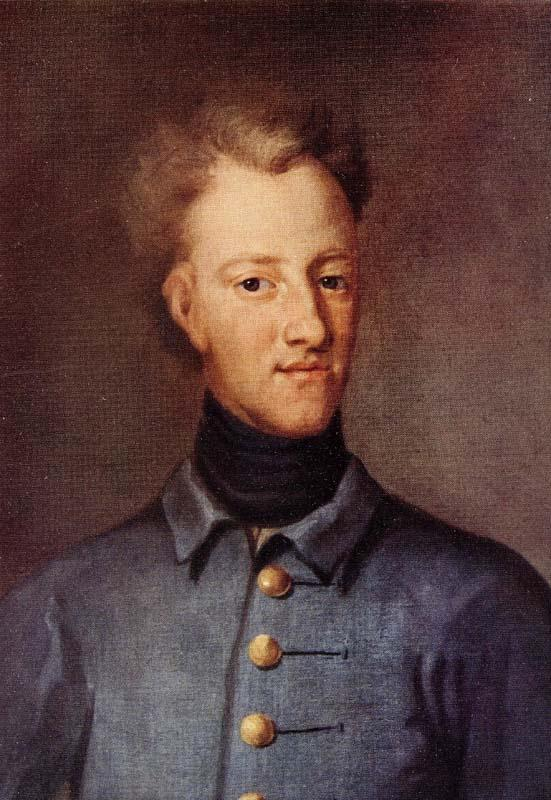
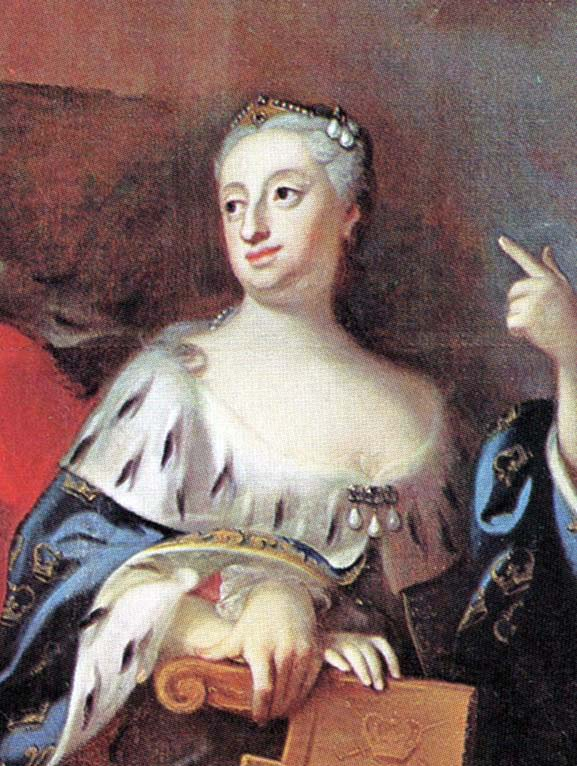
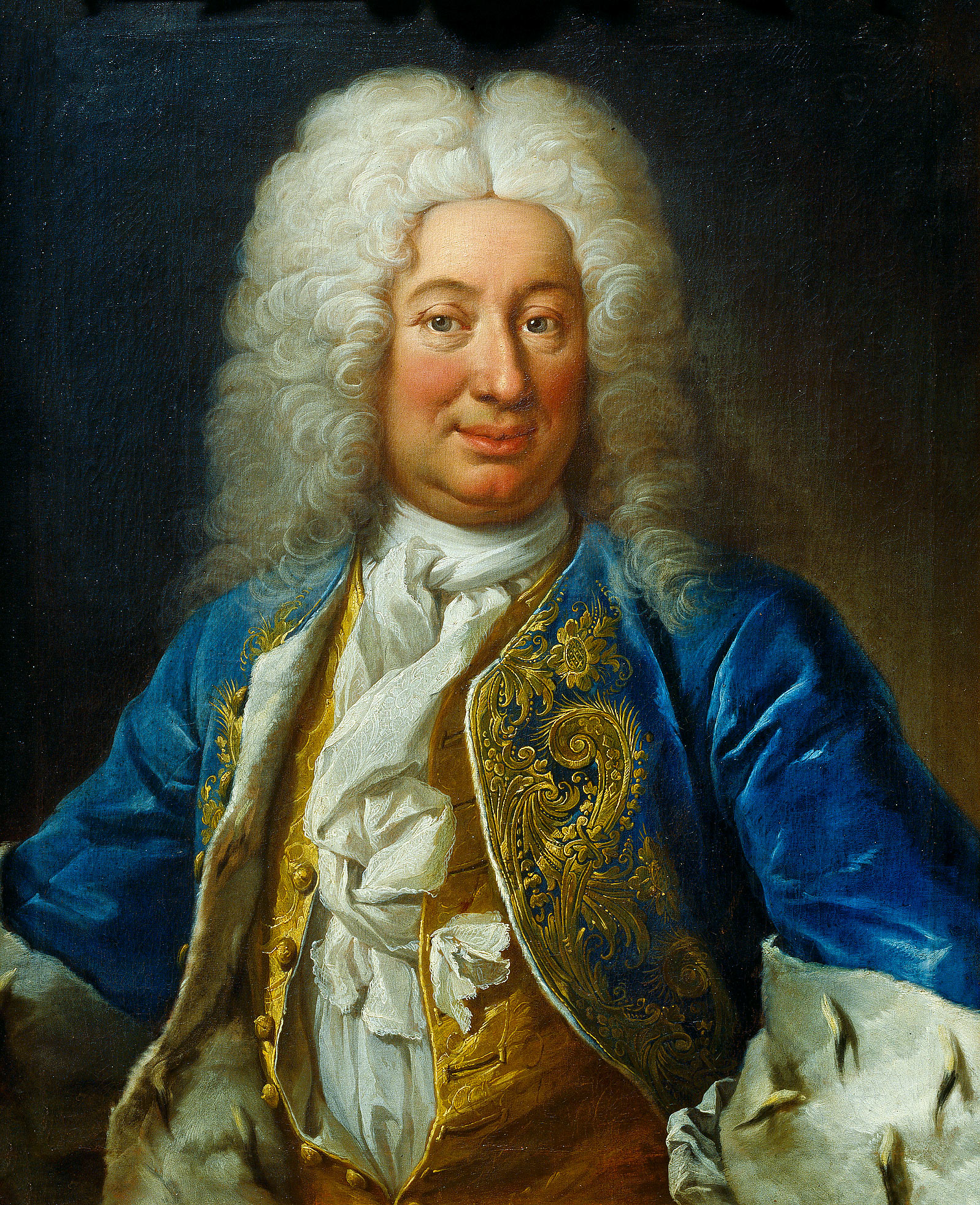
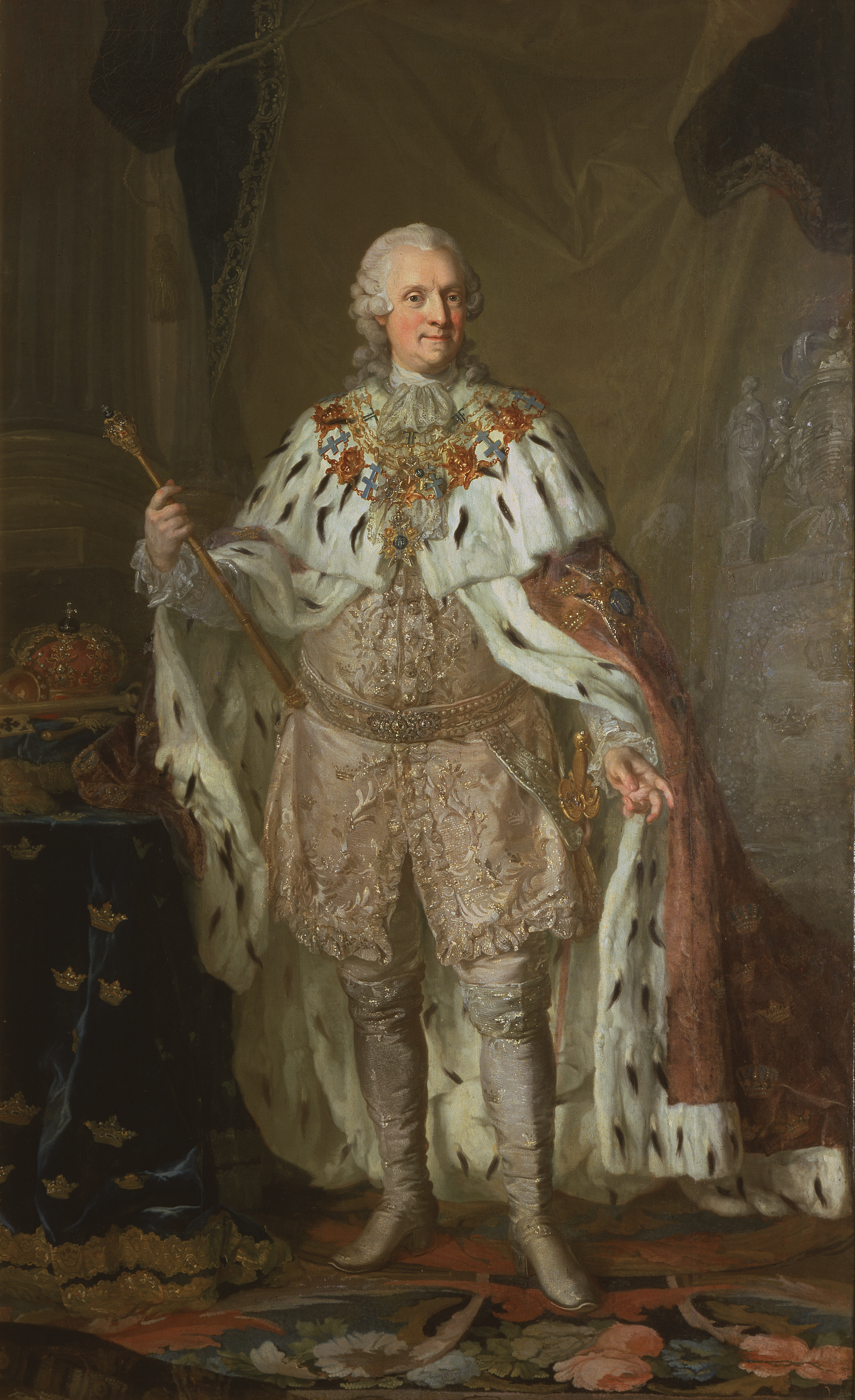
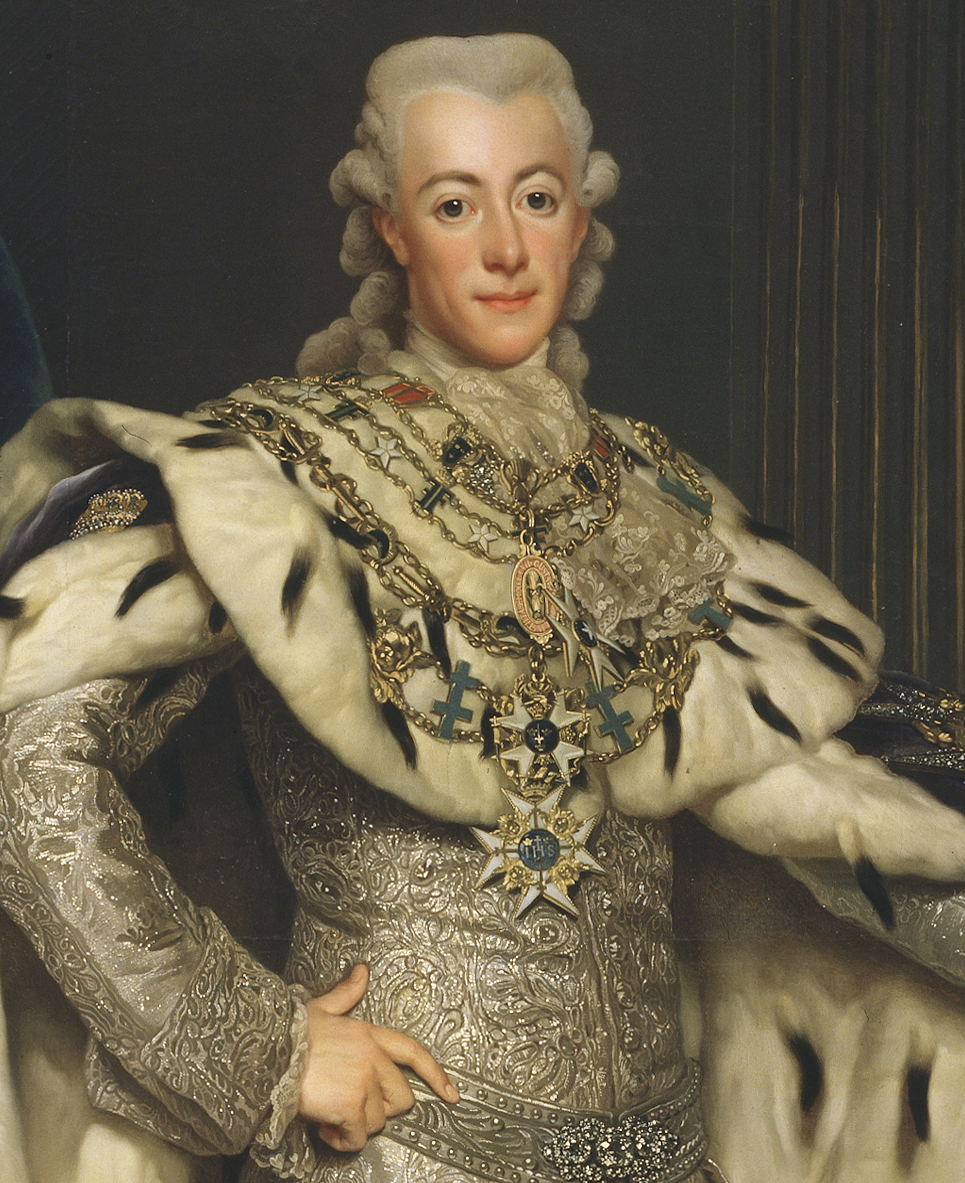
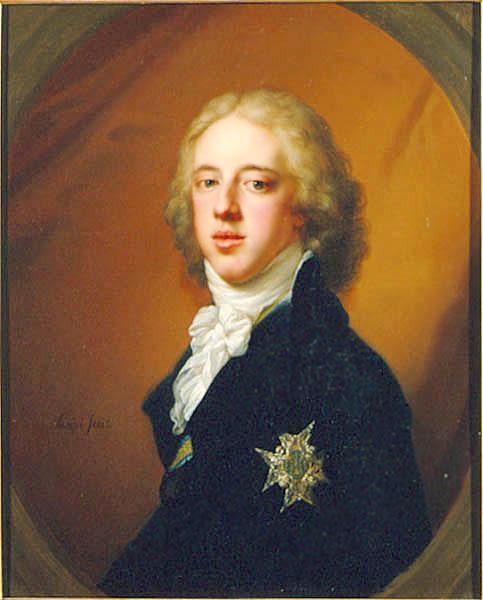
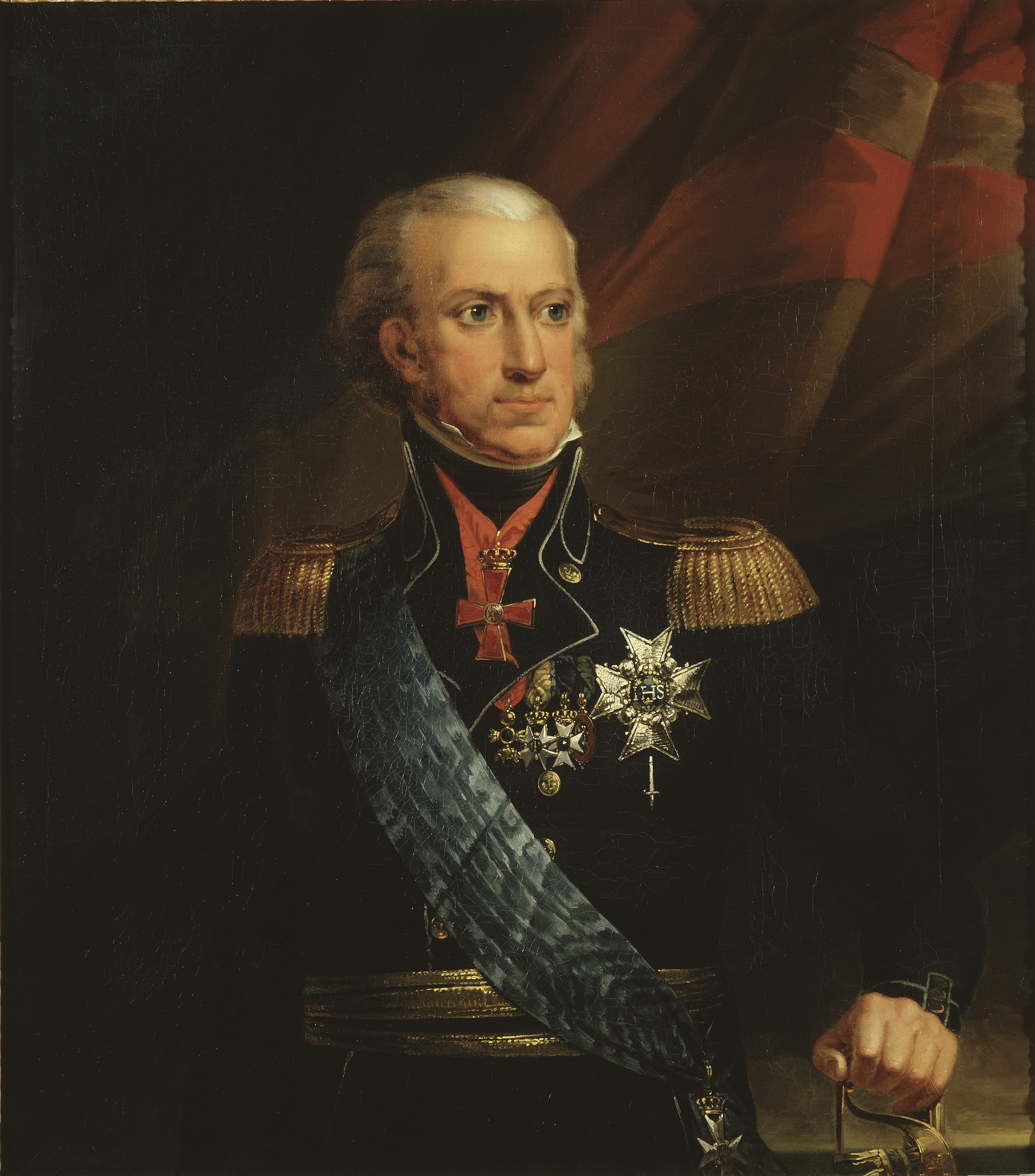
Swedish Pomerania continued general superintendency and consistory in Greifswald. Their ambit shrank with the territorial cessions to Brandenburgian Pomerania.
Term	Image	Name
1648–1654		Christina of Sweden
1654–1660		Charles X Gustav
1660–1697		Charles XI
1697–1718		Charles XII
1718–1720		Ulrika Eleonora
1720–1751		Frederick I
1751–1771		Adolphus Frederick
1771–1792		Gustav III
1792–1809		Gustavus IV Adolphus
1809–1815		Charles XIII
Swedish Pomerania was ceded to Denmark who then passed it on to Prussia in exchange for Saxe-Lauenburg. In 1817 the Pomeranian Lutheran congregations subject to the Greifswald general superintendent became part of the new Evangelical Church in Prussia, an administratively united umbrella of Lutheran, Calvinist and United Protestant congregations.

==== State Church in Brandenburgian Pomerania (1648–1817) ====
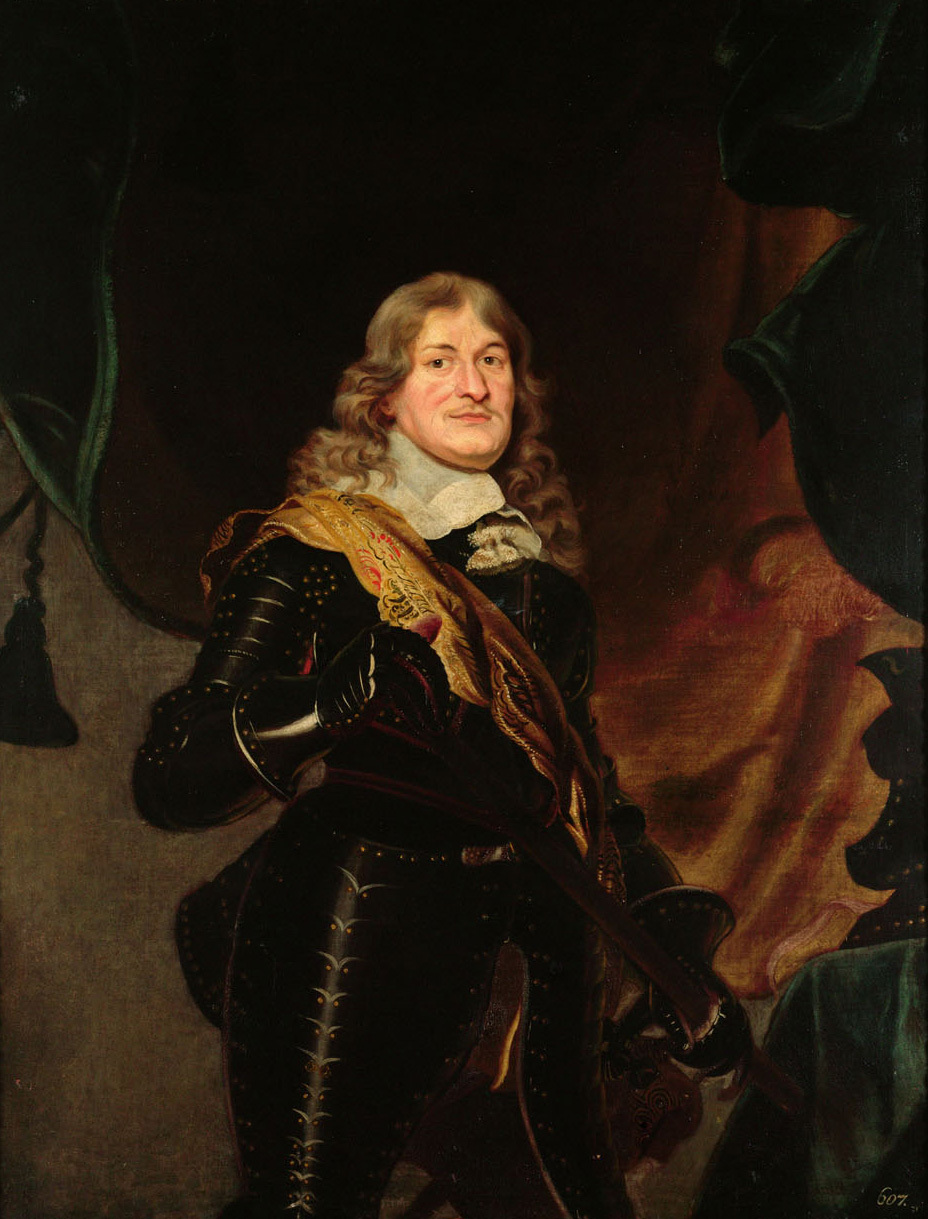
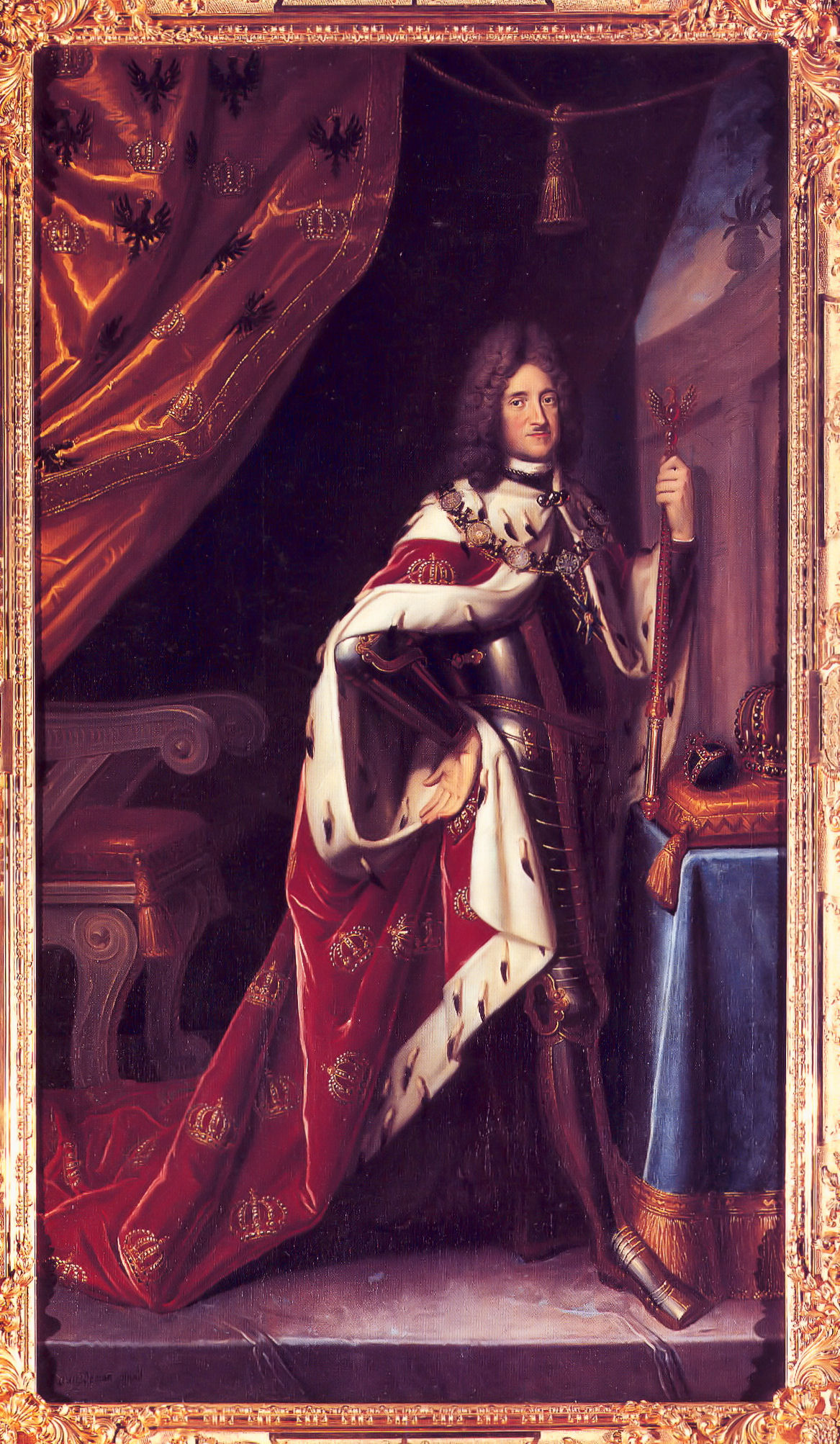
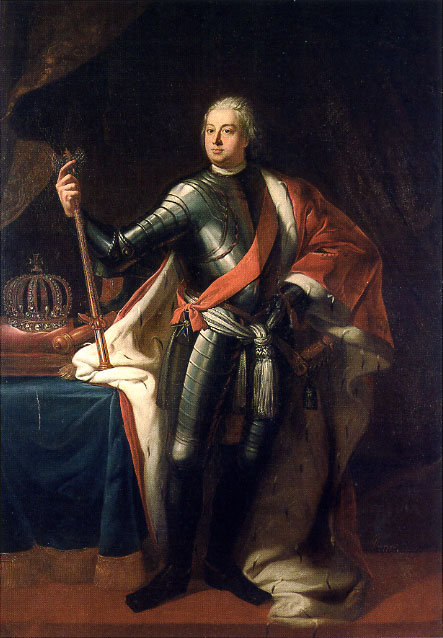
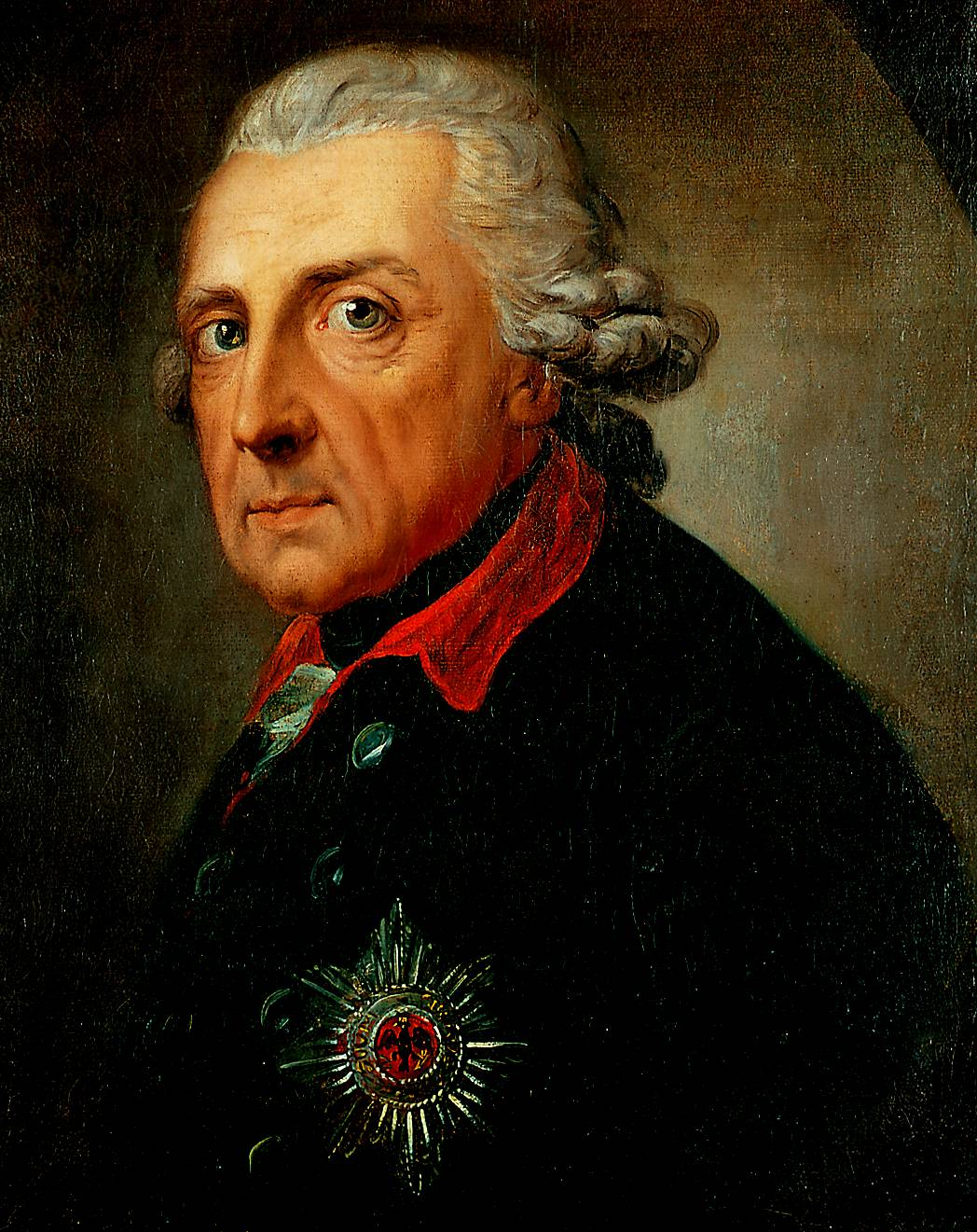
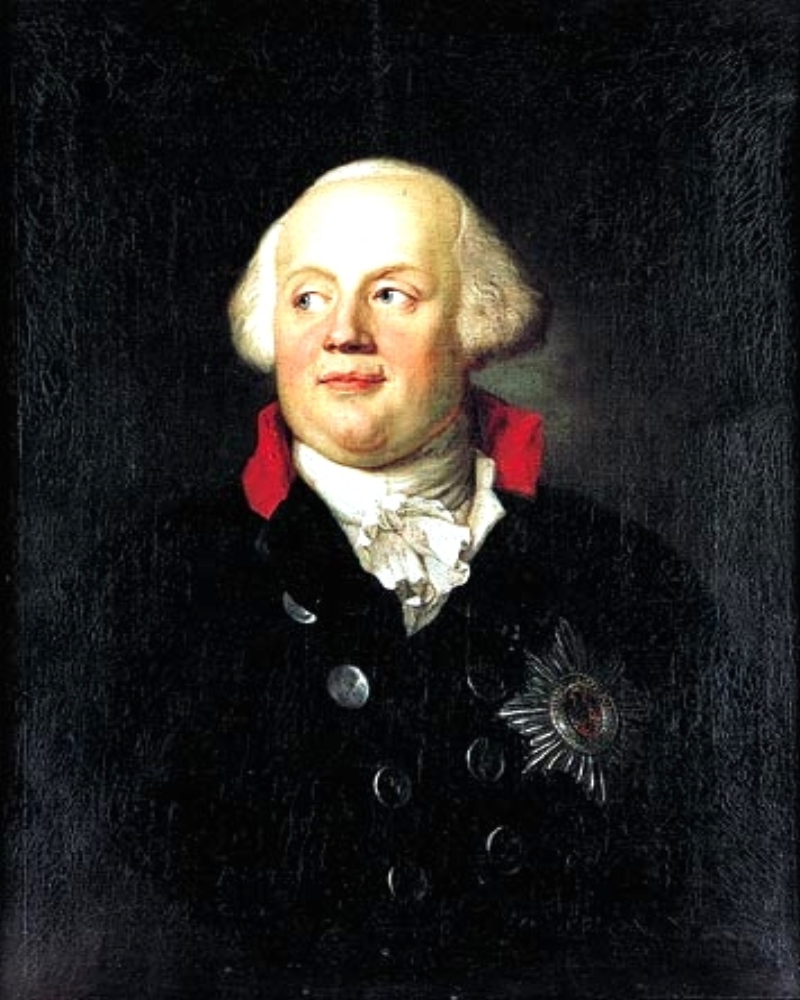
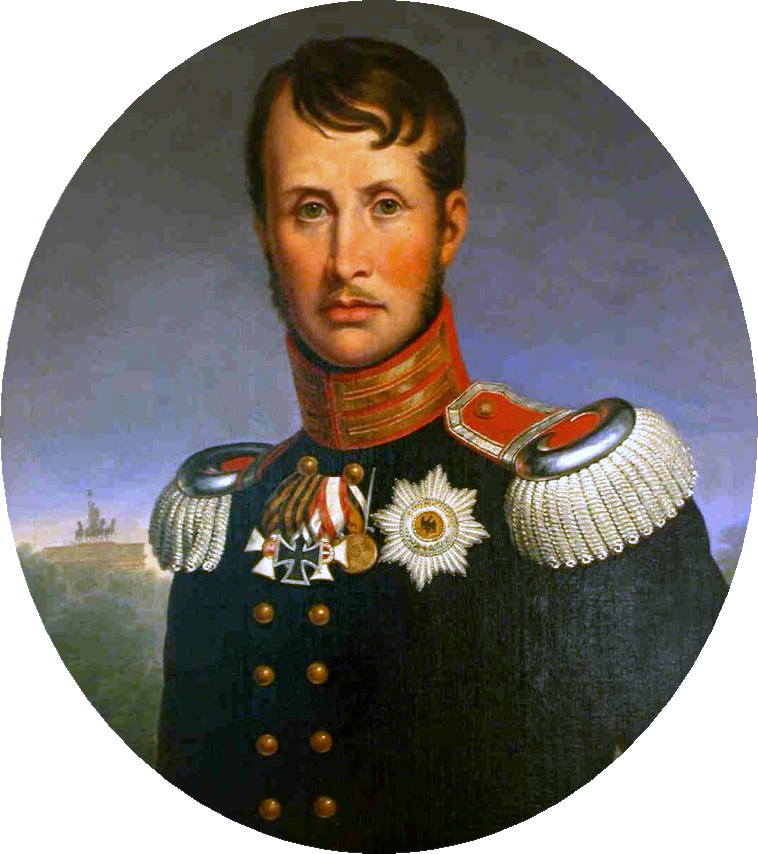
Brandenburgian Pomerania took over the Cammin prince-episcopal consistory and superintendency in Kolberg, elevated to general superintendency. In 1738 they moved to Stettin, acquired in 1713.
Term	Image	Name
1637–1688		Frederick William the Great Elector
1688–1713		Frederick I
1713–1740		Frederick William I
1740–1786		Frederick II
1740–1786	In 1750 the Lutheran State Church of Brandenburgian Pomerania became an ecclesiastical district subject to the Berlin-based Lutheran Superior Consistory of Brandenburg-Prussia.
1786–1797		Frederick William II
1797–1840		Frederick William III
In 1817 the Pomeranian Lutheran congregations subject to the Stettin general superintendent under the Lutheran Superior Consistory in Berlin became part of the new Evangelical Church in Prussia, an administratively united umbrella of Lutheran, Calvinist and United Protestant congregations.

==== Ecclesiastical Province of Pomerania (1826–1918) ====
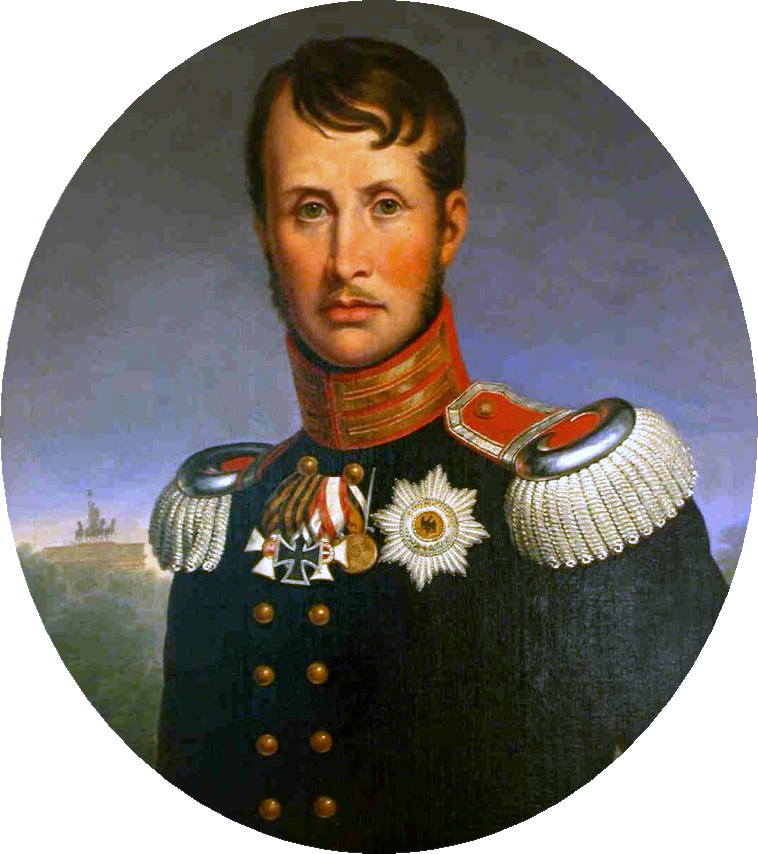
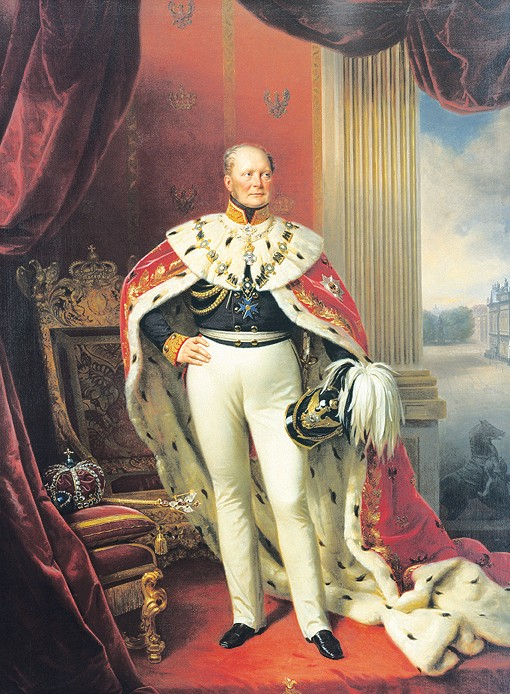
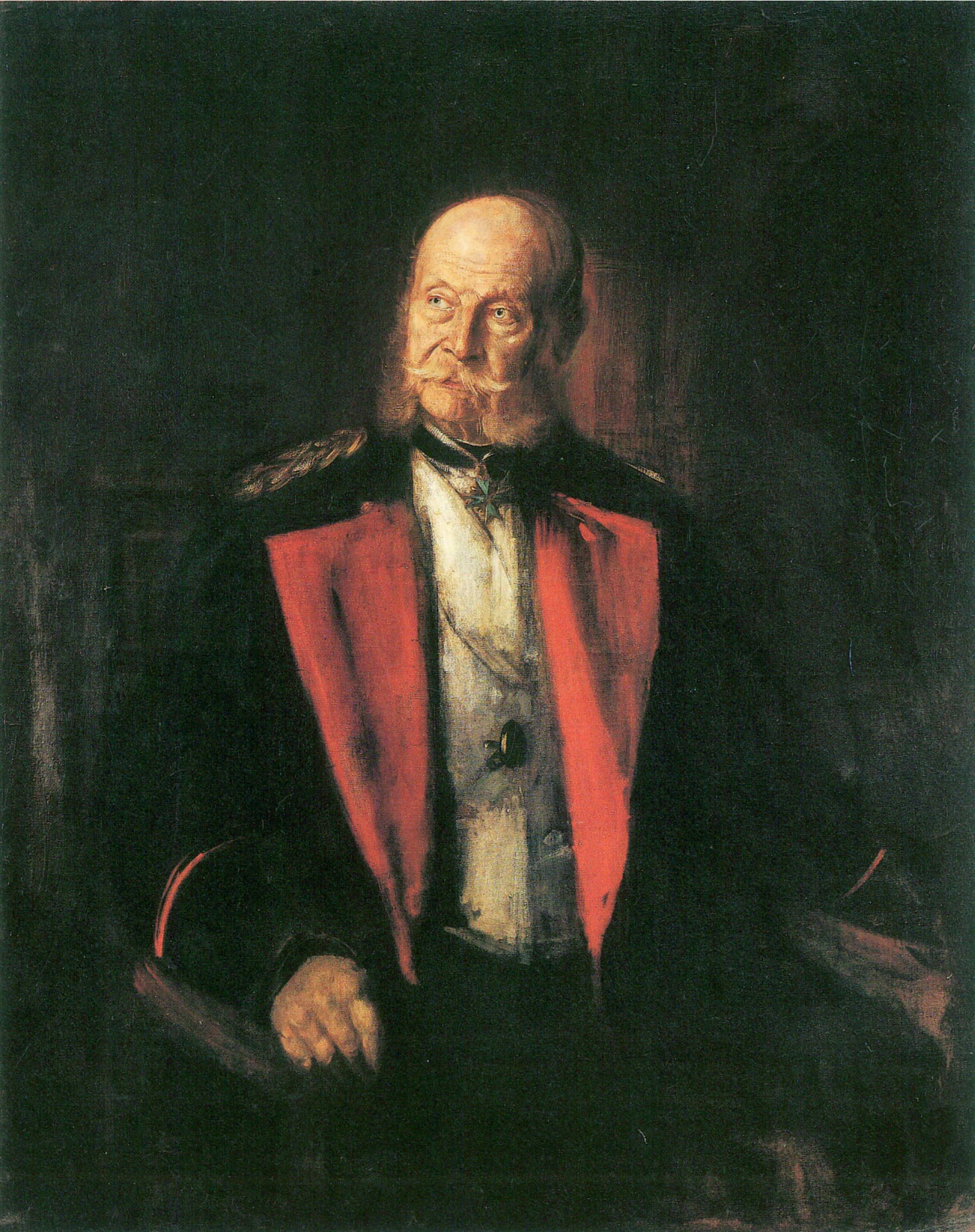
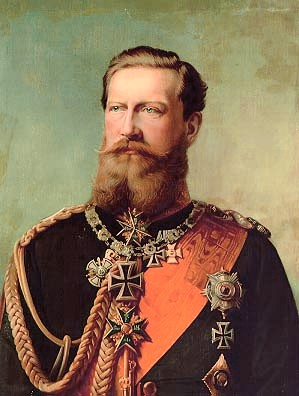
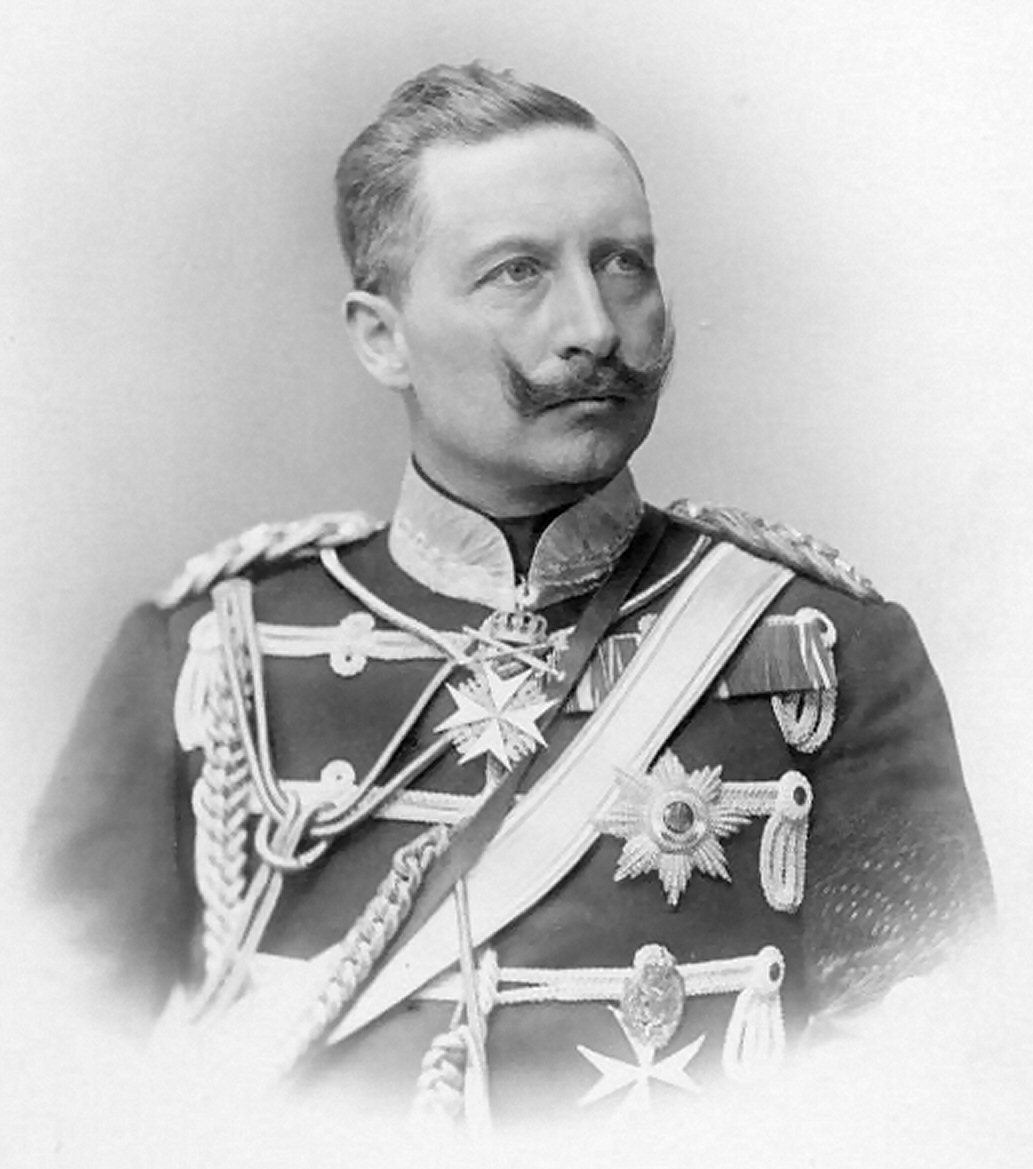
In 1817 the Lutheran congregations previously subject to the Stettin general superintendent under the Lutheran Superior Consistory in Berlin, the Lutheran congregations previously subject to the Greifswald general superintendent and the Reformed (Calvinist) congregations located in Pomerania and subject to the Reformed Church Directorate in Berlin, became part of the new Ecclesiastical Province of Pomerania, seated in Stettin, an ecclesiastical district of the Evangelical Church in Prussia.
Term	Image	Name
1797–1840		Frederick William III
1840–1861		Frederick William IV
1861–1888		William I
1888		Frederick III
1888–1918		William II
The dethronement of the Hohenzollern in 1918 and the separation of church and state, as decreed by the Weimar Constitution in 1919, did away with the summepiscopacy of the monarchs. The Evangelical State Church of Prussia's older Provinces (this name as of 1875) turned into an independent regionally competent church body, renamed as Evangelical Church of the old-Prussian Union. Its new church order generally provided for stronger presbyterial and synodal participation, particularly in the ecclesiastical provinces, such as that of Pomerania.

=== Spiritual leaders (1535–2012) ===
==== In Greifswald (1535–1653) ====
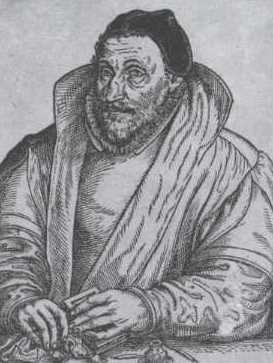
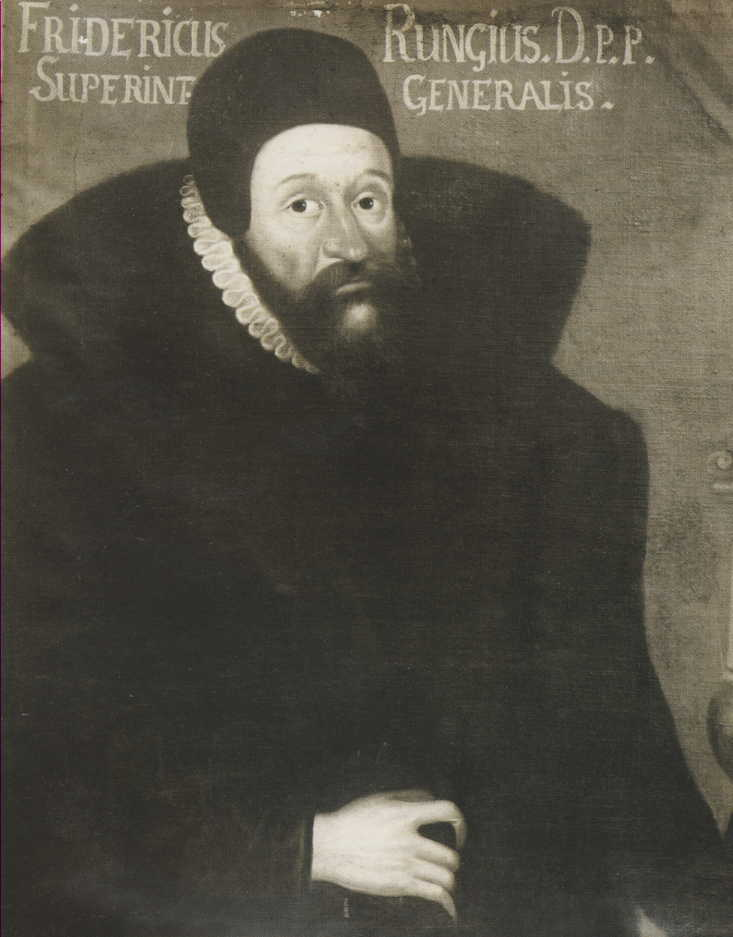
Pomerania-Wolgast installed in Greifswald, Pomerania's only university town, its general superintendency and consistory (as of 1553). Their ambit included dependent Pomerania-Barth (1569–1605).
Term	Image	Name
1535– 1556		Johannes Knipstro
1557– 1595		Jacob Runge
1595– 1597	vacancy
1597– 1604		Friedrich Runge
1604– 1607	vacancy
1607– 1642		Bartold von Krakevitz, separate ambits persisted also after Pomerania-Stettin had inherited Wolgast in 1625
1642– 1650		Mövius Völschow, appointed by Sweden
1650– 1658	vacancy, border disputes between Brandenburg and Sweden, both claiming Pomerania
The Treaty of Westphalia ceded all of former Pomerania-Wolgast and the west of former Pomerania-Stettin to Sweden in 1648.

==== In Pomerania-Stettin (1535–1653) ====
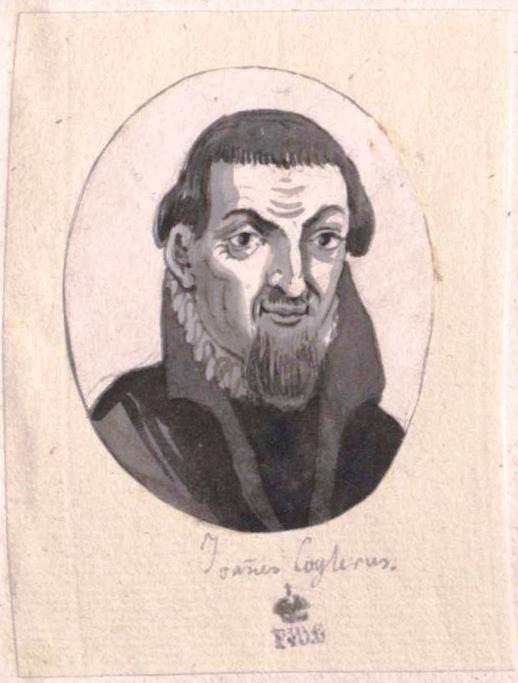
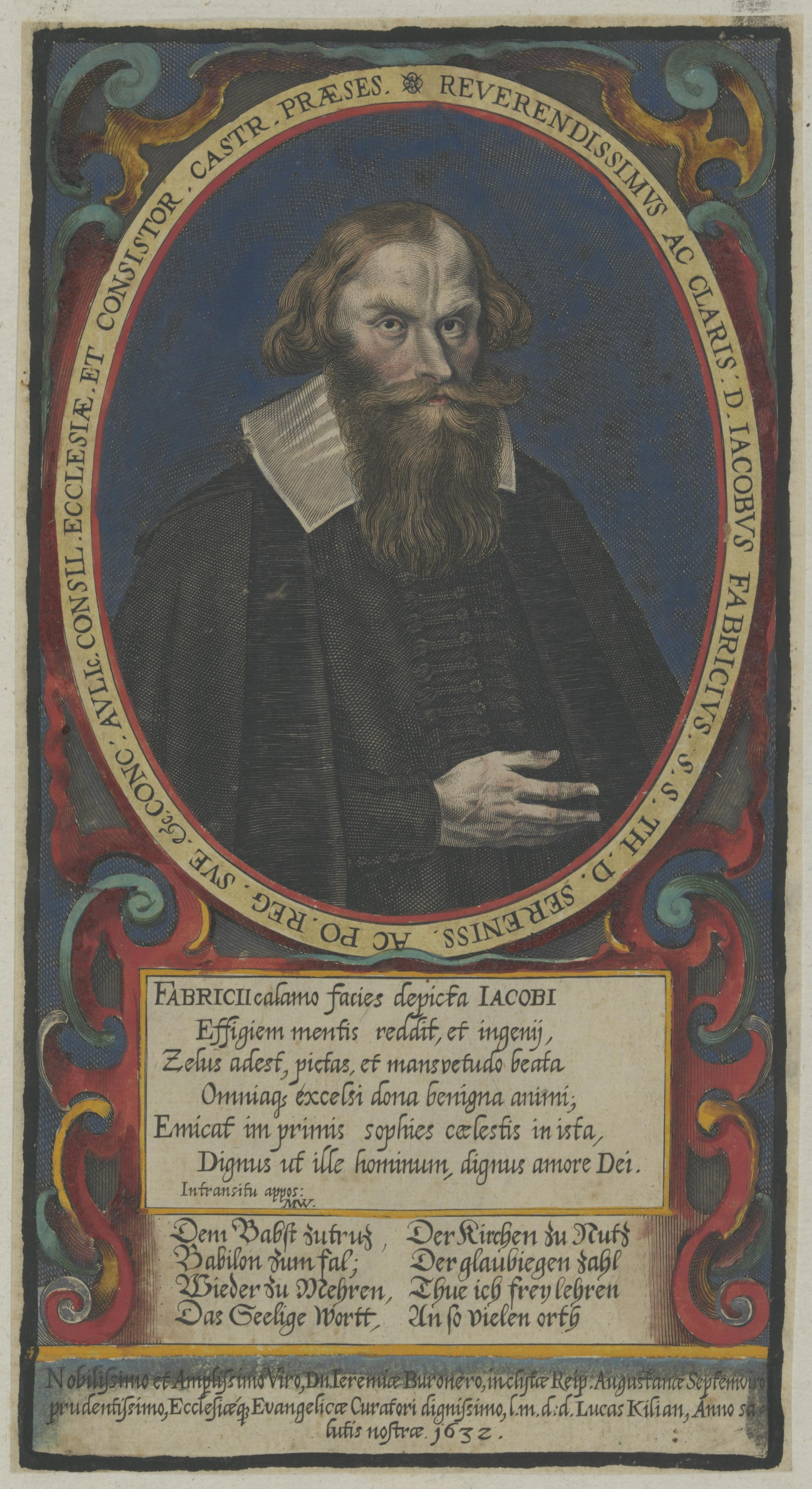
Pomerania-Stettin installed the general superintendency of Stettin for its territory west of the Grabow, and east thereof the only subsidiary general superintendency of Stolp. The latter's ambit included dependent Pomerania-Rügenwalde (1569–1620).
Term	In Stettin Name	Term	In Stolp Name
1535– 1563	Paul vom Rode	1535– 1573	Jakob Hogensee (aka Hoonsee)
1563– 1570	Fabian Timäus	1535– 1573	Jakob Hogensee (aka Hoonsee)
1570– 1572	Christoph Stymmel	1535– 1573	Jakob Hogensee (aka Hoonsee)
1572– 1595	Johann Cogeler	1574– 1604	David Crolle After his death his ambit merged in that of Faber
1595– 1613	Jakob Faber	1574– 1604	David Crolle After his death his ambit merged in that of Faber
1613– 1618	vacancy
1618– 1634	David Reutzius (aka Reuß), separate ambits persisted also after Pomerania-Stettin had inherited Wolgast in 1625
1634– 1641	Jakob Fabricius
1641– 1653	vacancy, border disputes between Brandenburg and Sweden, both claiming Pomerania
Former Pomerania-Stettin was partitioned between Brandenburgian (centre and east) and Swedish Pomerania (west) with Stettin until 1713, then ceded to the former.

==== In Kolberg (1544–1650) ====
In 1544 Cammin's first Lutheran bishop led the Reformation in his prince-episcopal state (Hochstift Cammin), elsewhere in his diocese the respective dukes had appointed general superintendents. The successors after 1556 lacked theological skills so that two years later the Hochstift installed a superintendent.
Term	Image	Name
1544– 1549		Bartholomaeus Suawe, Bishop of Cammin, Lutheran
1549– 1556		Martin Weiher, last bishop with theological skills, his successors were only ruling the prince-bishopric and enjoying its revenues
1556– 1558	vacancy, Weiher's successors lacked theological skills
1558– 1567		Georg Venetus, Stiftssuperintendent
1568– 1602		Petrus Edeling
1602– 1605	vacancy
1605– 1620		Adam Hamel
1622– 1645		Immanuel König
1645– 1650		Andreas Scholasticus (Scholastke), episcopal court preacher, vice-superintendent
1650– 1653	vacancy, border disputes between Brandenburg and Sweden, both claiming Pomerani
In 1645 Brandenburg seized the prince-bishopric. Its Lutheran Church and that of eastern Farther Pomerania were merged.

==== In Greifswald (1658–1810) ====
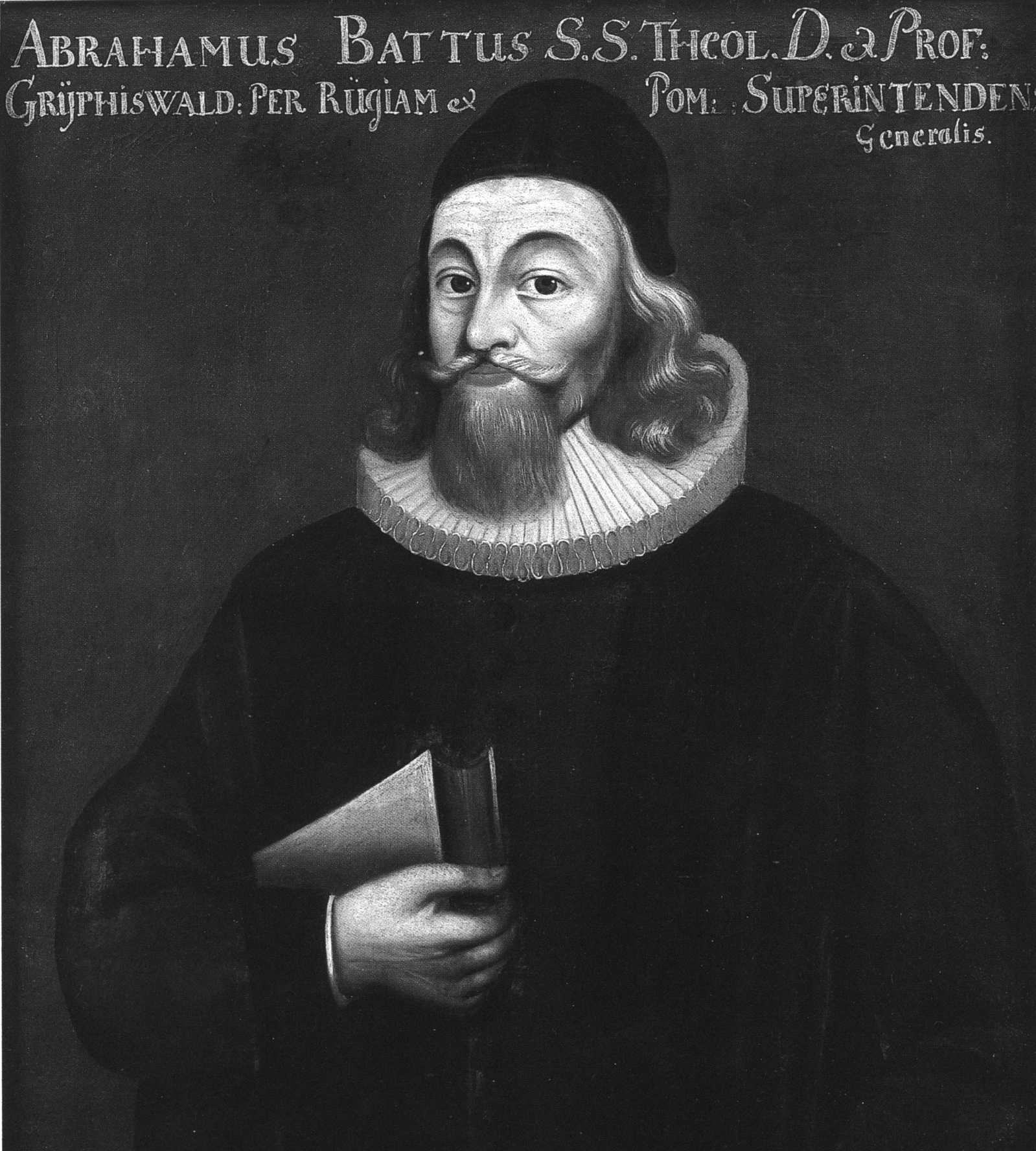
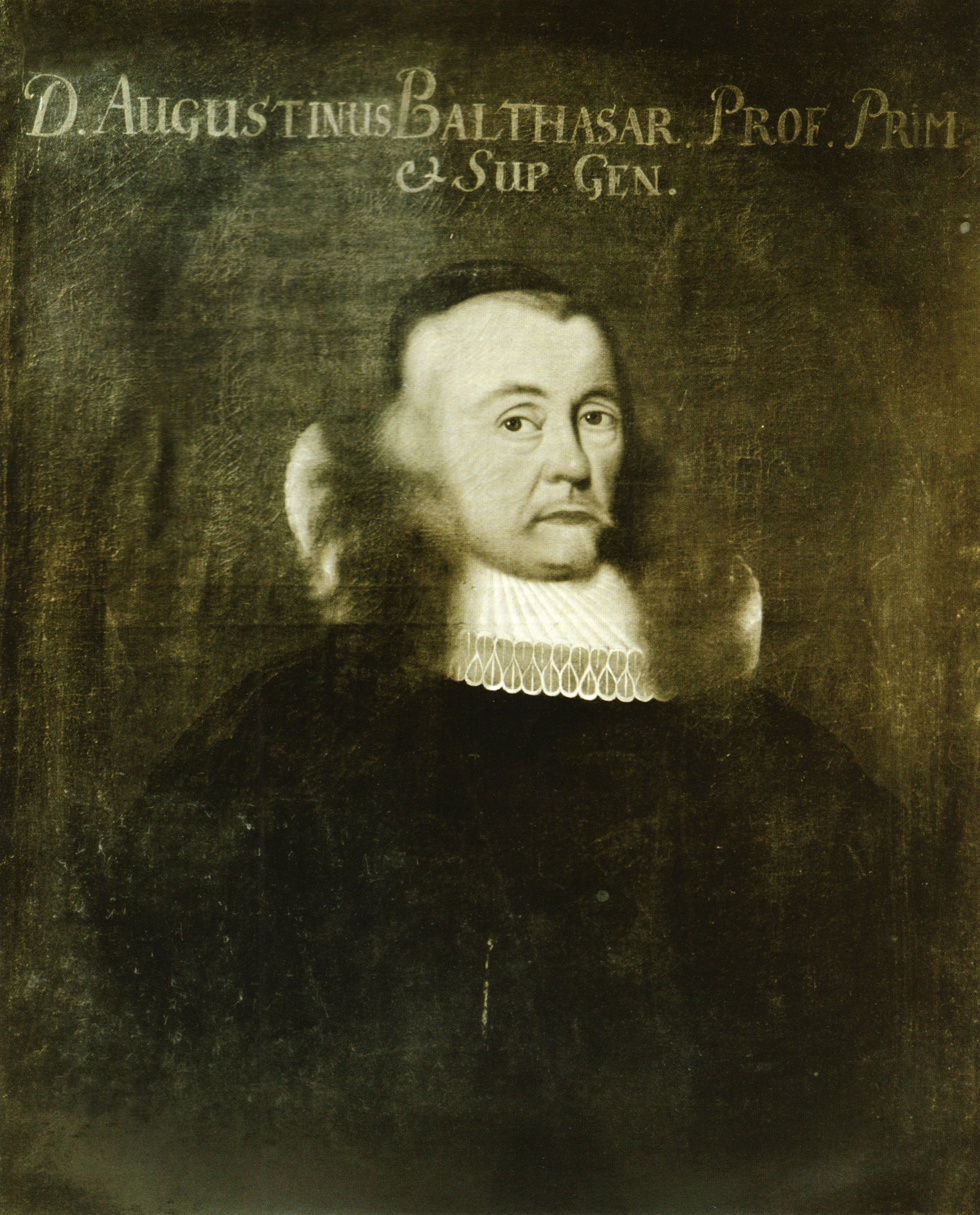
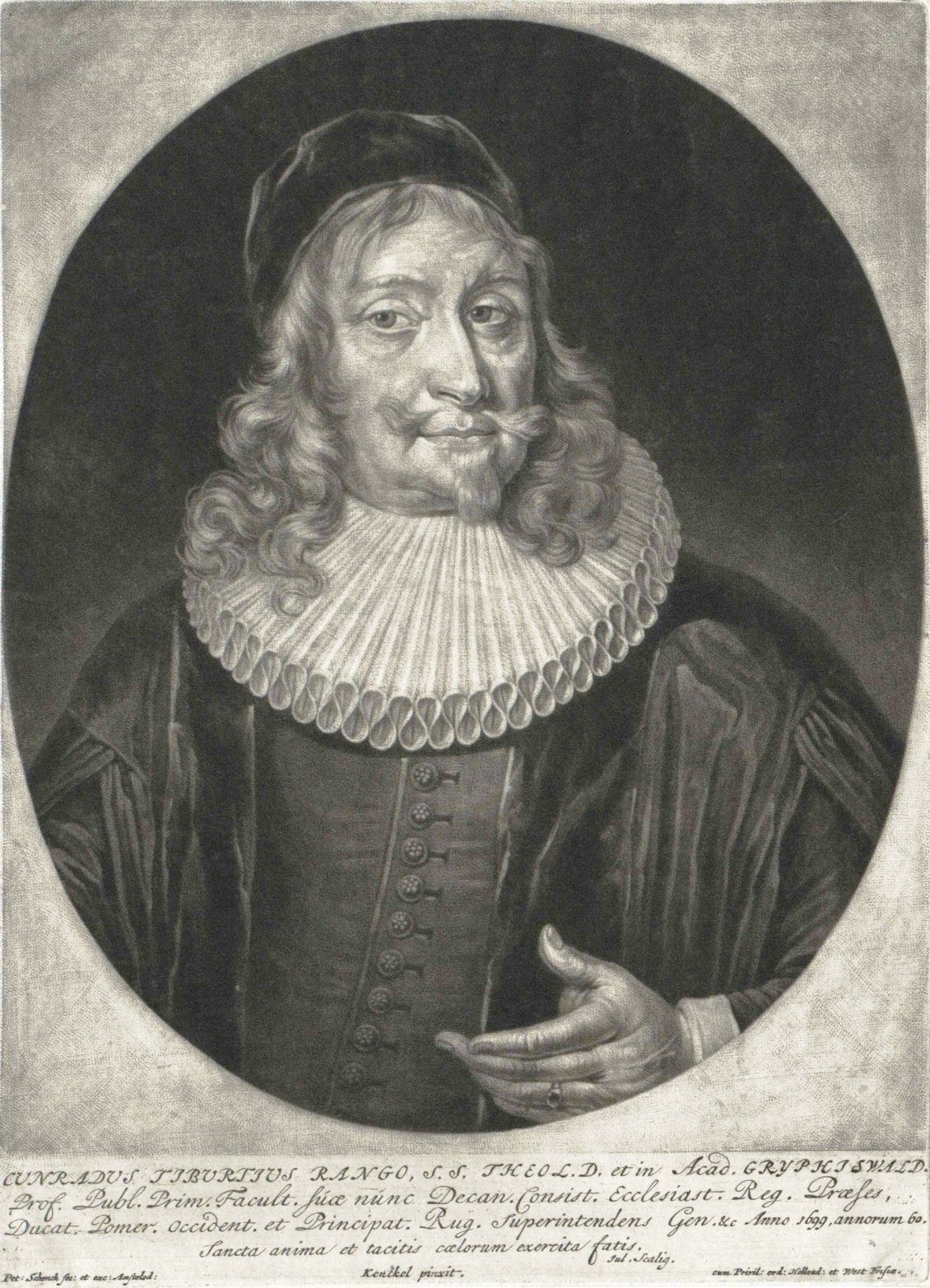
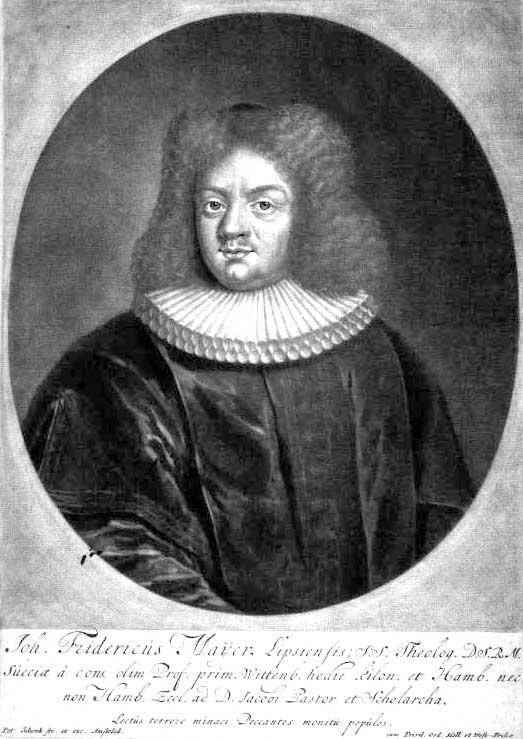
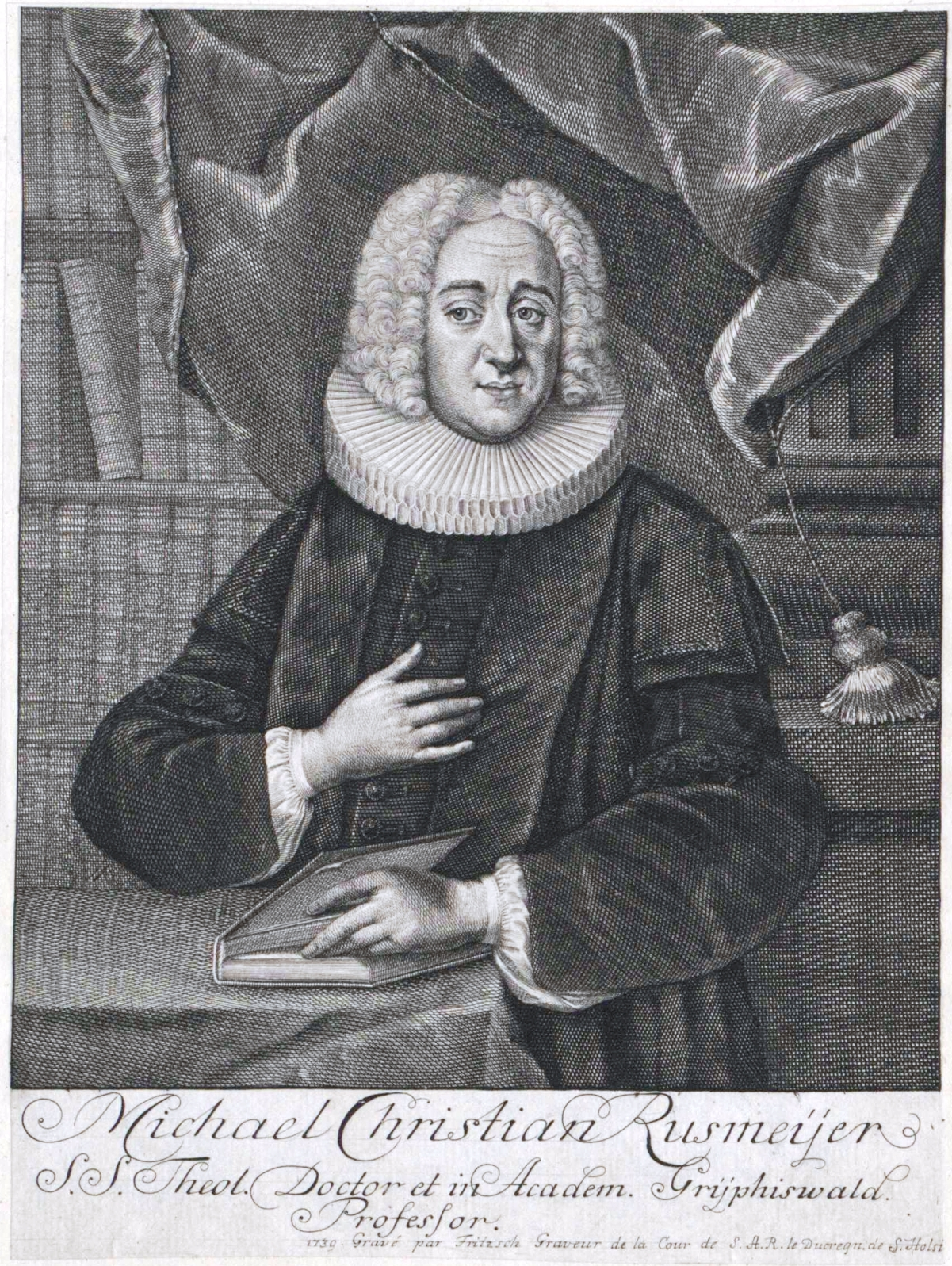
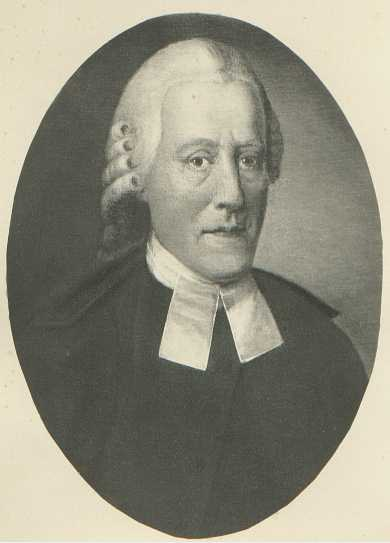
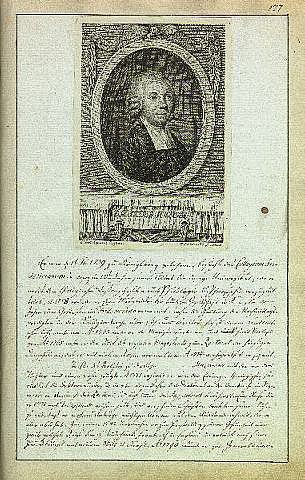
Swedish Pomerania continued general superintendency and consistory in Greifswald. Their ambit shrank with the territorial cessions to Brandenburgian Pomerania.
Term	Image	Name
1658–1662	vacancy	Abraham Battus per pro
1662–1674		Abraham Battus
1675–1675		Matthäus Tabbert
1675–1680	vacancy
1680–1688		Augustinus Balthasar
1689–1700		Konrad Tiburtius Rango
1701–1712		Johann Friedrich Mayer
1712–1719	vacancy due to Danish occupation	Heinrich Brandanus Gebhardi per pro as vice-general superintendent (1716–1719)
1719–1721		Heinrich Brandanus Gebhardi, appointed by the Danes, deposed by Swedes
1721–1732		Albrecht Joachim von Krakevitz, appointed in 1715, hindered by Danish occupation
1732–1734	vacancy
1734–1738		Timotheus Lütkemann
1738–1740	vacancy
1740–1745		Michael Christian Rusmeyer
1746–1763		Jakob Heinrich von Balthasar
1763–1778		Laurentius Stenzler
1778–1788		Bernhard Friedrich Quistorp
1788–1790	vacancy
1790–1810		Gottlieb Schlegel
1810–1812	vacancy
1812–1824		Johann Christoph Ziemssen
1824–1826	vacancy
The ambits of the Stettin and Wolgast general superintendencies merged to form the new Ecclesiastical Province of Pomerania within the new Evangelical Church in Prussia.

==== In Kolberg (1653–1668), Stargard (1668–1738), and in Stettin (1738–1826) ====
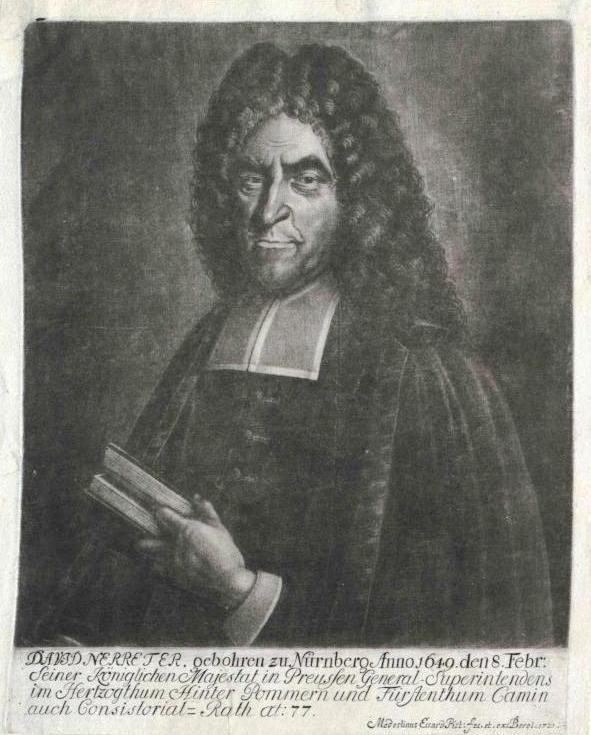
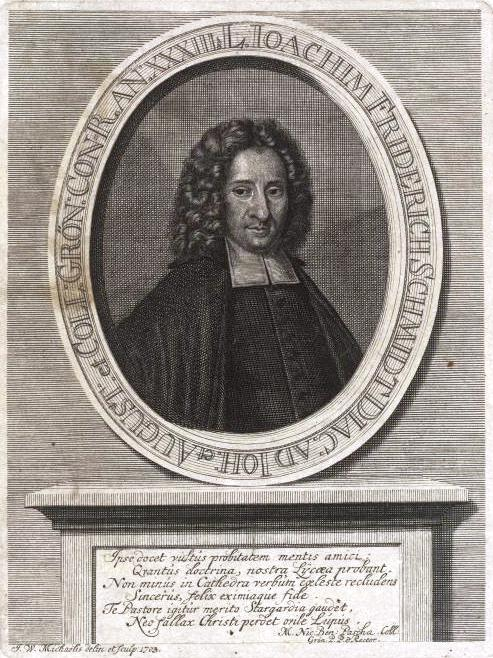
Brandenburgian Pomerania installed its general superintendency in Kolberg, since Stettin was under Swedish rule until 1713.
Term	Image	Name
1653–1673		Christian Groß
1653–1673	General superintendency moved to Stargard in 1668.
1673–1679	vacancy
1679–1683		Sylvester Grabe
1683–1688	vacancy	Between 1683 and 1686 clergy in Kolberg officiated by proxy, before the seat returned to Stargard.
1688–1707		Günter Heyler
1707–1709	vacancy
1709–1720		David Nerreter
1720–1724		Joachim Friedrich Schmidt
1725–1738		Laurentius David Bollhagen
With Brandenburgian Pomerania having annexed Stettin in 1713, the general superintendency moved there in 1738.
1738–1757		Johann Gottfried Hornejus
1757–1759	vacancy
1759–1775		Gottfried Christian Rothe
1775–1791		Friedrich Christian Göring
1792–1824		Gottlieb Ringeltaube
1824–1826	vacancy
The ambits of the Wolgast and Stettin general superintendencies merged to form the new Ecclesiastical Province of Pomerania within the new Evangelical Church in Prussia.

==== In Stettin (1826–1921) ====
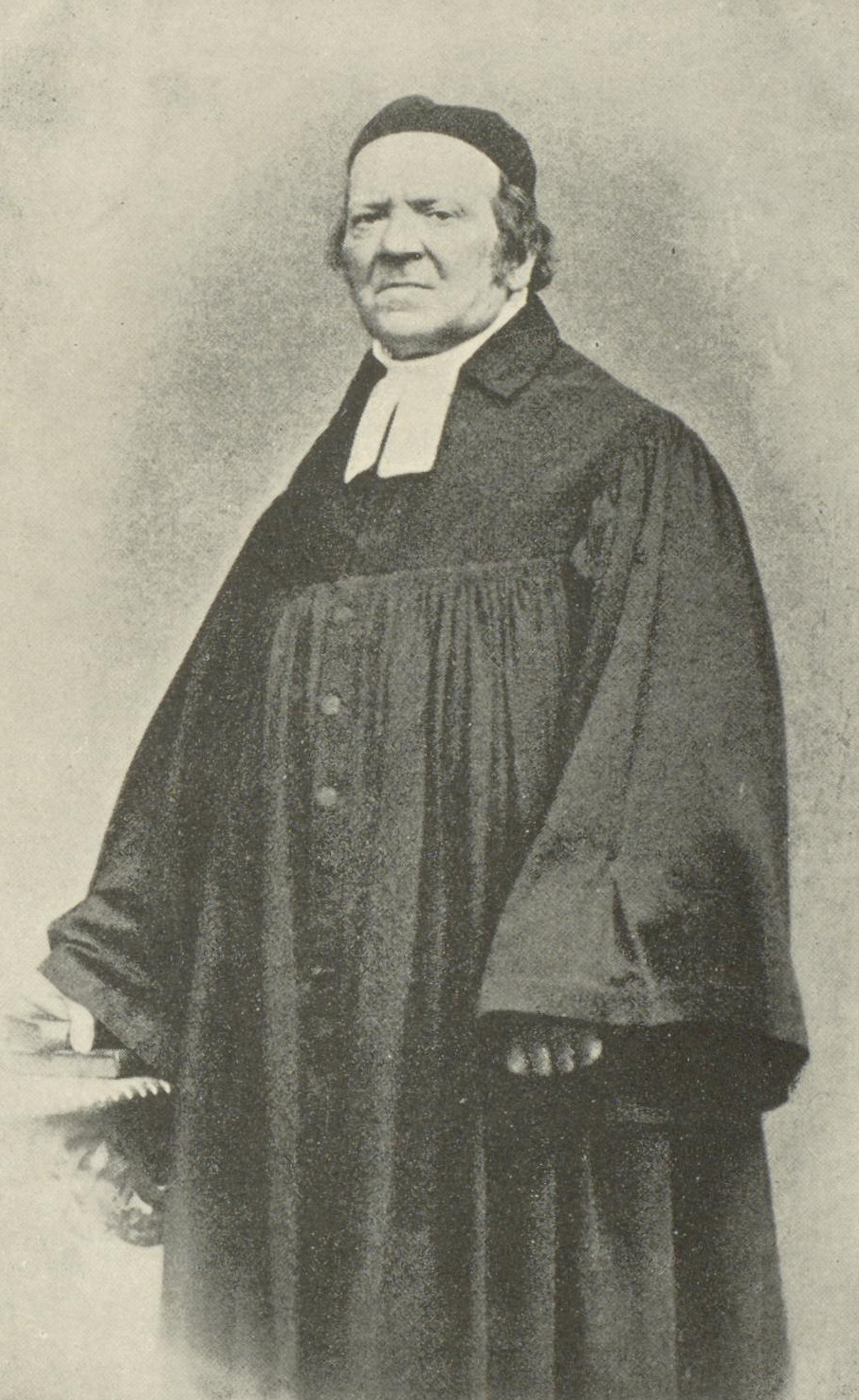
The Ecclesiastical Province of Pomerania reinstalled one general superintendency, seated in Stettin.
Term	Image	Name
1826		Friedrich Ludwig Engelken, granted the honorific title bishop
1827–1854		Carl Ritschl, granted the honorific title bishop
1855–1885		Albert Sigismund Jaspis
1885–1904		Heinrich Poetter
1904–1919		Johannes Büchsel
1919–1921	vacancy
After the end of the summepiscopacy through the dethronement of the Hohenzollern in 1918 and the separation of church and state, as decreed by the Weimar Constitution in 1919 the Evangelical State Church of Prussia's older Provinces (this name as of 1875) reformed its constitution in favour of more presbyterial and synodal participation.

==== In Greifswald (1921–2012) and in Stettin (1921–1945) ====
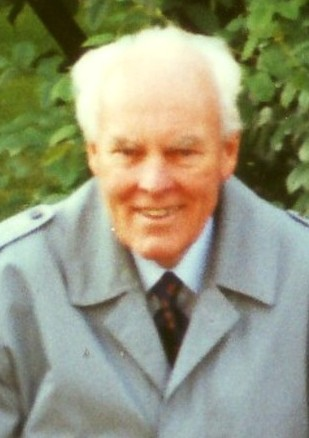
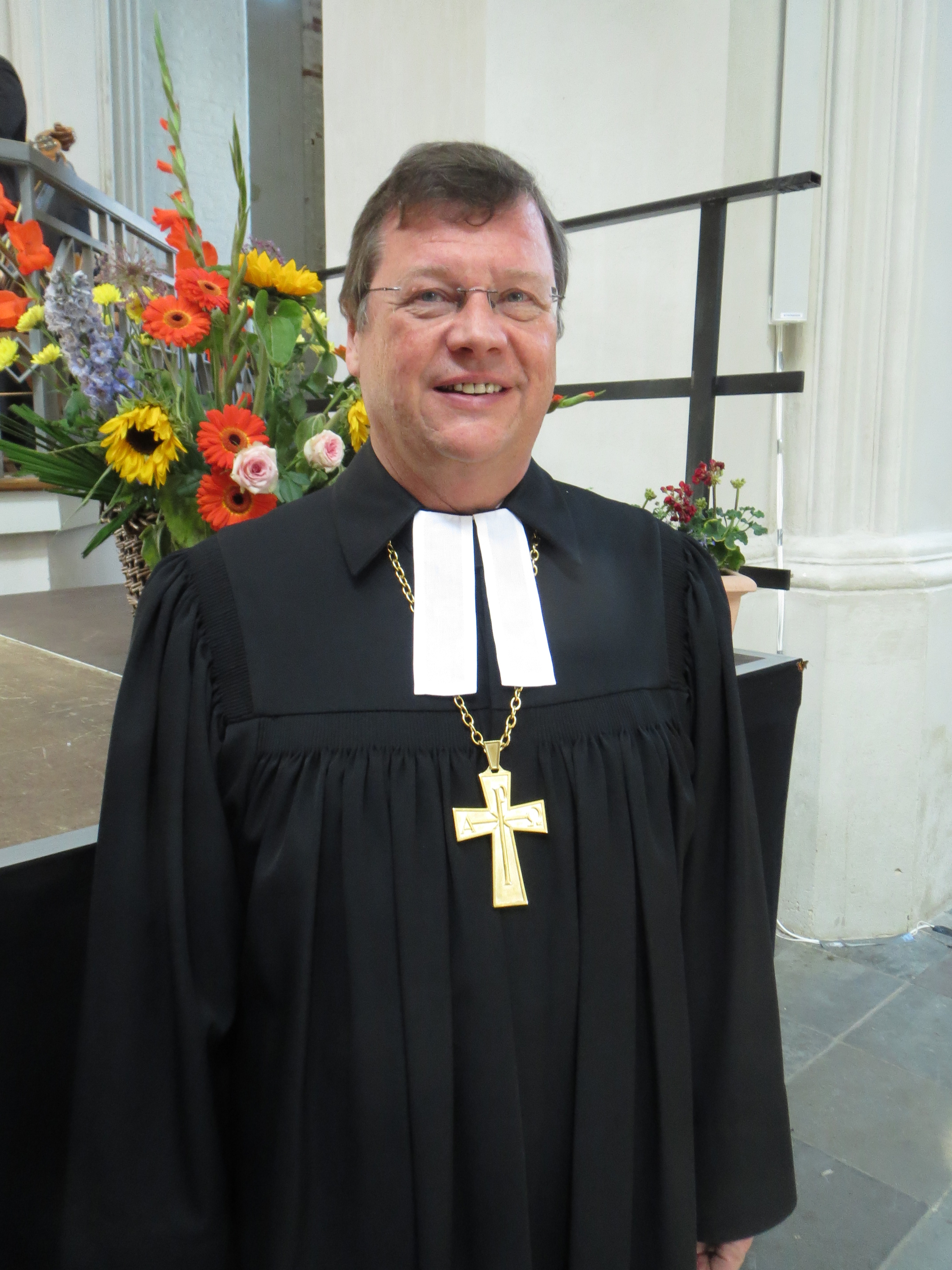
In 1921 the Ecclesiastical Province of Pomerania, then as to territory and the number of parishioners the largest ecclesiastical province of the Evangelical Church of the old-Prussian Union (new name in 1922), installed two districts, east and west (Ostsprengel and Westsprengel), with a general superintendent each, one in Greifswald and the other in Stettin. The central institutions for all the ecclesiastical province were seated in Stettin too.
Term		In Greifswald Name	Term	In Stettin Name
1921–1922		Wilhelm Reinhard	1921–1933	Paul Kalmus
1923–1934		Walter Kähler	1921–1933	Paul Kalmus
1933–1936	vacancy, new parallel structure built up:	Karl Thom, self-aggrandising as Bishop of Cammin, 1933–1935	1934–1945	Heinrich Laag, per pro only
1936–1945		Heinrich Ernst Boeters	1934–1945	Heinrich Laag, per pro only
1945–1946	vacancy, reorganisation after end of Nazi tyranny and war turmoil		1945–1948	vacancy, flight and expulsion of parishioners, expropriation of the church, suppression of any attempt of reorganisation
With Poland annexing Stettin in 1945 the ecclesiastical headquarters moved to Greifswald, the new spiritual leader assumed the title bishop and in 1950 the ecclesiastical province assumed independence as regional Protestant church body named Pomeranian Evangelical Church.
1946–1954		Karl von Scheven, before praeses of the provincial synod
1955–1972		Friedrich-Wilhelm Krummacher
1972–1989		Horst Gienke, resigned when unmasked as Stasi spy
1990–2001		Eduard Berger
2001–2012		Hans-Jürgen Abromeit
At Pentecost of 2012 the Pomeranian Evangelical Church merged with two Lutheran church bodies in the Evangelical Lutheran Church in Northern Germany.
