= Wyszewka =

Location
- Country: Poland
- Voivodeship: West Pomeranian
- County (Powiat): Koszalin
- Gmina: Gmina Manowo

Physical characteristics
- Source
  - location: southeast of Wyszewo
  - coordinates: 54°06′10.1″N 16°24′11.4″E
- Mouth: Dzierżęcinka
  - location: Lubiatowo Wschodnie (northwest of Wyszebórz)
  - coordinates: 54°09′11″N 16°17′57″E
  - elevation: 28 m (92 ft)
- Length: 9.82 km (6.10 mi)
- Basin size: 22.04 km^{2} (8.51 mi^{2})

Basin features
- Progression: Lubiatowo Wschodnie→ Lubiatowo Północne→ Dzierżęcinka→ Jamno

Wyszewka is a small river of Poland. Southeast of Koszalin it flows into the lake Lubiatowo Wschodnie, which is drained by the Dzierżęcinka.
