= Dzierżęcinka =

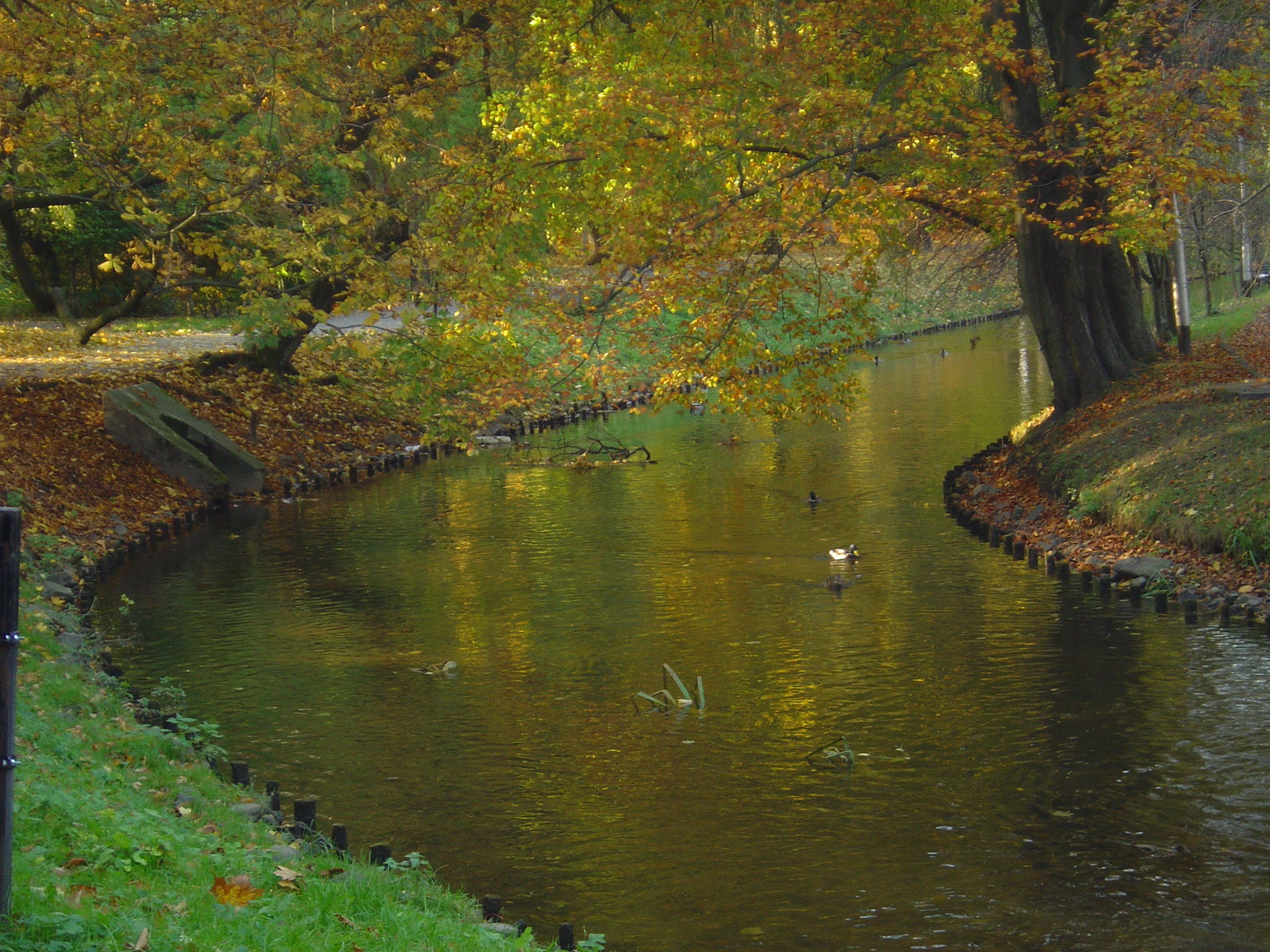
- Dzierżęcinka viewed from the Park of the Dukes of Pomerania

Location
- Country: Poland
- Voivodeship: West Pomeranian

Physical characteristics
- Source
  - location: near Zacisze, Gmina Manowo
  - coordinates: 54°05′12.0″N 16°20′17.0″E
- Mouth: Jamno
  - location: northeast of Dobiesławiec, Gmina Będzino
  - coordinates: 54°15′06″N 16°07′56″E
- Length: 29.30 km (18.21 mi)
- Basin size: 122.62 km^{2} (47.34 sq mi)

The Dzierżęcinka (Polish pronunciation: [d͡ʑʲɛrʐɛɲˈt͡ɕiŋka]; German: Mühlenbach or Kösliner) is a river in Poland with a length of 29.30 km, located in Koszalin County in the West Pomeranian Voivodeship. Rising in nearby Manowo, the Dzierżęcinka flows through Koszalin and eventually reaches Jamno lagoon to the north.
