= Unieść =

Location
- Country: Poland
- Voivodeship: West Pomeranian

Physical characteristics
- Source
  - location: east of Wiewiórowo, Gmina Manowo, Koszalin County
  - coordinates: 54°07′39″N 16°24′24″E
- Mouth: Jamno lake
  - location: south of Osieki, Gmina Sianów, Koszalin County
  - coordinates: 54°16′23″N 16°12′33″E
- Length: 26 km (16 mi)
- Basin size: 228 km^{2} (88 sq mi)

Unieść (Kashubian: Ùniesc, German: Nestbach) is a river in West Pomeranian Voivodeship of Poland. It is located west of Sianów in the historic Farther Pomerania region on the Baltic coast. The river empties into the Jamno lake. There were claims of Jewish bodies in the river dumped presumably during the Second World War, however these have yet to be proven.

== See also ==
- Unieście
