= Lands of Schlawe and Stolp =

Historical region in present-day Poland

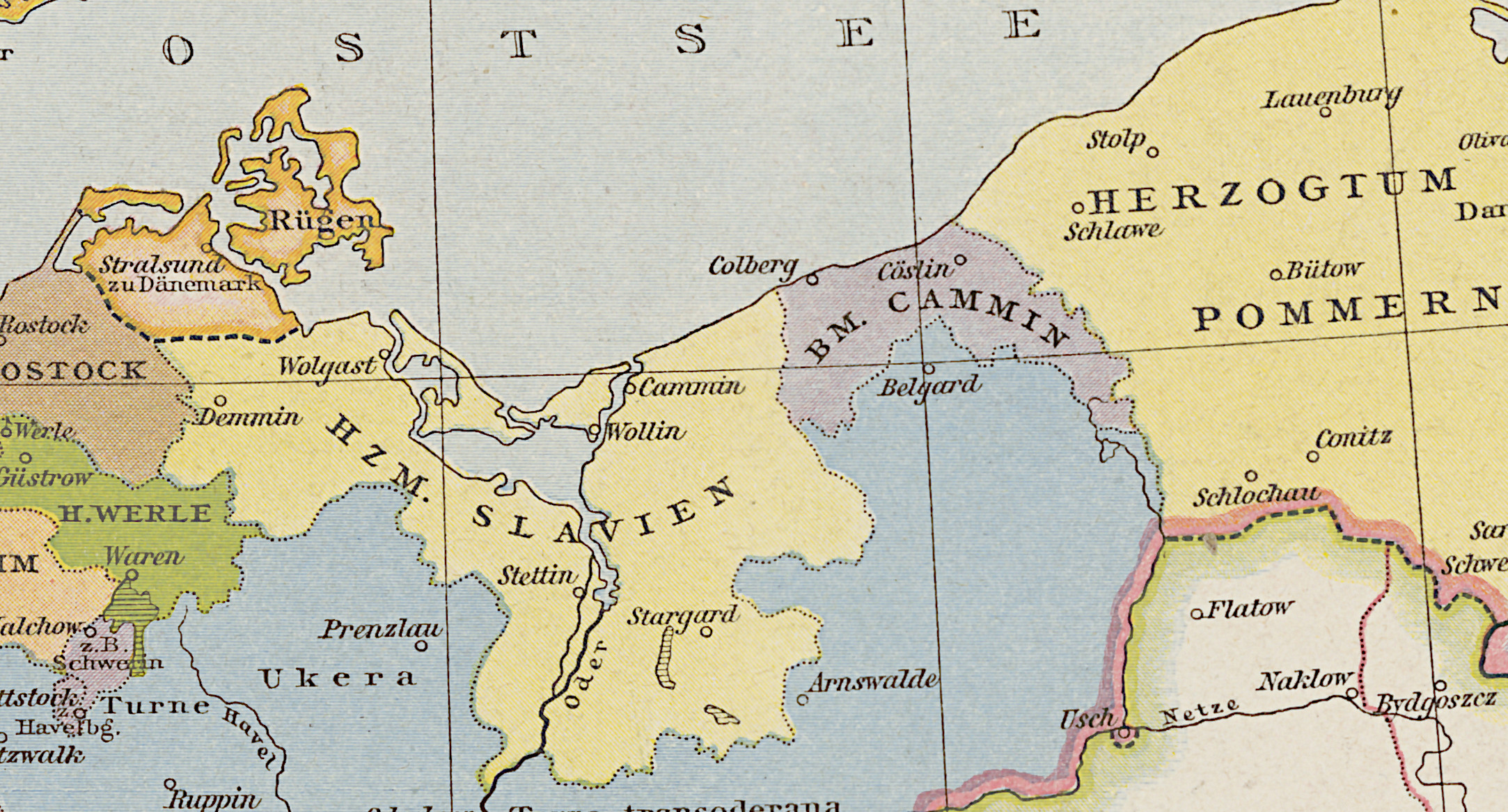
Schlawe and Stolp as part of Herzogtum Pommern (i.e. Duchy of Pomerelia) under Duke Swantopolk II about 1250; 1886 map by Gustav Droysen

The Schlawe and Stolp Land (Note: German: Länder Schlawe und Stolp) (also known as Słupsk and Sławno Land) (Note: Polish: Ziemia Słupsko-Sławieńska) is a historical region in Pomerania, centered on the towns of Sławno (Schlawe) and Słupsk (Stolp) in Farther Pomerania (Eastern Pomerania), present-day Poland.

The area holds historical significance as it was initially ruled by a cadet branch of the House of Griffin and did not belong to the Duchy of Pomerania (Slavinia) under Duke Wartislaw I and his descendants when they became vassals of the Holy Roman Emperor in 1181. It was ruled by the Samboride dukes of Pomerelia from 1227 and conquered by Margrave Waldemar of Brandenburg-Stendal in 1309. The region was not incorporated into the Duchy of Pomerania until 1317.

== Geography ==
The small region comprises the easternmost lands of historic Farther Pomerania, where the Wieprza and Słupia Rivers empty into the Baltic Sea. The area lay beyond the territory of the Prince-Bishops of Cammin, with the border running along the Unieść creek, Lake Jamno, and the Góra Chełmska hill (about 2 km (1.2 mi) east of Koszalin) in the west. In the east, the Łeba River marked the historic border with Lauenburg and Bütow Land in Pomerelia (Gdańsk Pomerania).

Since World War II and the implementation of the Oder-Neisse line in 1945, the Farther Pomeranian region belonged to Poland. Initially part of the larger Szczecin Voivodeship from 1945, the powiats (counties) of Sławno and Słupsk were incorporated into Koszalin Voivodeship in 1950 and belonged to the smaller Słupsk Voivodeship from 1975. Since the 1998 administrative reform, the Lands of Schlawe-Stolp are divided between West Pomeranian Voivodeship (Sławno) and Pomeranian Voivodeship (Słupsk).

== History ==
In the early 12th century, the Pomeranian lands were once again subdued by the Polish prince Bolesław III Wrymouth. His vassal, the Griffin duke Wartislaw, ruled over the lands around the mouth of the Oder River and Szczecin, while the eastern lands of Schlawe and Stolp were ruled by his brother, Duke Ratibor I, since the 1120s.

When Wartislaw was murdered around 1135, Ratibor assumed the rule over his late brother's duchy as regent for his minor nephews. However, upon Ratibor's death in 1156, the domains were again separated: Schlawe-Stolp was inherited by Ratibor's sons, Swietopelk and Bogislaw, the so-called "Ratiborides" cadet branch of the Griffin House of Pomerania. Meanwhile, their cousin, Duke Bogislaw I of Pomerania, pledged allegiance to Emperor Frederick Barbarossa in 1181. Nevertheless, all of Pomerania was under Danish occupation from the 1180s to 1227.

=== Samborides ===
The last member of the Ratiborides branch of the Griffins, Ratibor II, died in 1223. This led to an inheritance dispute between the Pomeranian Griffins and the Samborides dukes of neighbouring Pomerelia, vassals of the Piast Kingdom of Poland. As Ratibor II had died during the Danish period, Denmark administered the area until it had to withdraw after the lost Battle of Bornhöved in 1227. Duke Barnim I of Pomerania immediately took control of the lands after the Danish withdrawal but had to yield rights to the Pomerelian duke Swietopelk II, who claimed a closer relationship to the extinct Ratiborides and took over Schlawe-Stolp in 1235/36.

In the 1250s, the Pomeranian dukes mounted an unsuccessful campaign to regain the area. After the death of Duke Swietopelk II in 1266, Duke Barnim I of Pomerania again assumed rule over the Land of Schlawe, which he ceded to Prince Vitslav II of Rügen, the founder of Rügenwalde, in 1269. However, the Griffins had to cope with the rising Margraves of Brandenburg, who had secured their enfeoffment with Pomerania by Emperor Frederick II in 1231. On 1 April 1269, the Ascanian margraves John II, Otto IV, and Conrad of Brandenburg-Stendal signed the Treaty of Arnswalde with the late Swantopelks's son, Duke Mestwin II of Pomerelia, and acquired the seignory over Schlawe-Stolp.

Finally, on 3 September 1273, the Lands of Schlawe and Stolp became a fief under the Imperial Margraviate of Brandenburg. Contested by Duke Mestwin II of Pomerelia, Prince Vitslav II of Rügen finally withdrew in 1275 and two years later sold his rights to the area for 3.500 Brandenburgian Marks in silver to the Margraves of Brandenburg. In 1283, Mestwin II of Pomerelia finally took over. With his death in 1294 the Samborides dynasty became extinct. Competition arose anew, as in his testimony, the late Duke Mestwin II had ignored his earlier contracts and by the secret Treaty of Kępno had inserted the former Polish High Duke, Przemysł II of Greater Poland, as his successor.

=== Inheritance conflict ===
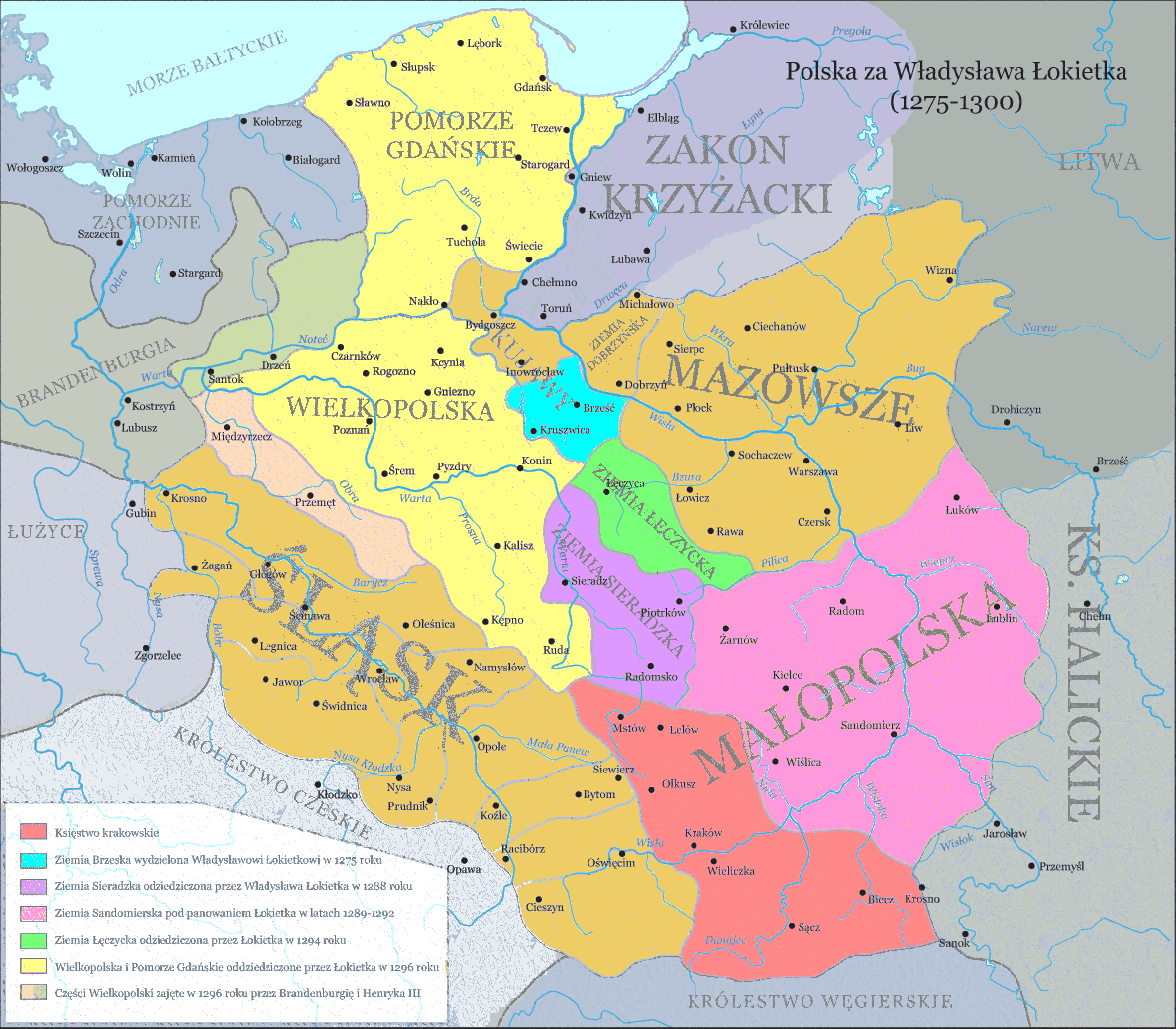
Kingdom of Poland in 1294-96, Pomerelian and Greater Polish lands of Przemysł II in yellow

Przemysł II was crowned King of Poland in 1295 and assumed rule over the Pomerelian lands, including Schlawe-Stolp. However, after his murder the following year, the lands of Schlawe, Stolp, and Rügenwalde fell to the Brandenburgian House of Ascania. A final attempt by Przemysł II to occupy the region ended in 1296 when Polish invasion troops were defeated by a Pomeranian contingent in a decisive battle near Bukowo, a village near Rügenwalde.

Following the death of King Przemysł II of Poland in 1296, a conflict over his succession broke out between his Piast cousin Władysław I the Elbow-high and the Bohemian king Wenceslaus II. According to a chronicle by Matthäus Merian the Elder published in 1652, the Schlawe-Stolp lands were again taken over by Vitslav of Rügen and Count Adolph from Holstein. In 1301, Vitslav's son Prince Sambor of Rügen, enfeoffed his castellan Matthew in Schlawe with domains in the surroundings of Schlawe, Rügenwalde, and Stolp. The Pomeranian dukes, acting under the sovereignty of Brandenburg, were expelled around 1301, following the ascension of Wenceslaus II as king of both Poland and Bohemia. In their place, Wenceslaus II appointed Frederick de Schassow (alternative spelling: de Scassowe, von Schachowitz, de Schachoviz, in Czech: z Chachowicz/Čachovice), a Silesian noble from Bohemia, chamberlain of the Kingdom of Poland, and gubernator (starosta) of the Duchy of Kuyavia and Duchy of Pomerania, who appeared in Schlawe in December 1302.

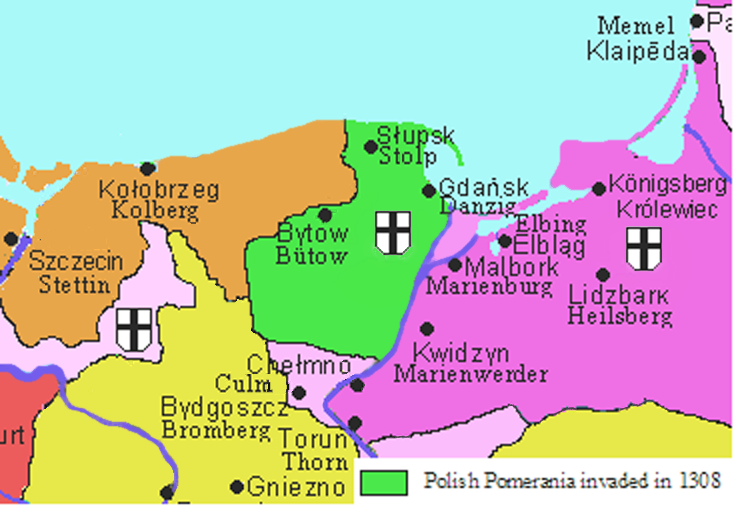
Pomerelian lands with Schlawe-Stolp (green) under the Teutonic Knights, 1308

After the deaths of both King Wenceslaus II and his young successor, Wenceslaus III, Duke Władysław I was able to reconquer large parts of the Polish territories. In 1305, the Brandenburg margraves returned to the lands of Schlawe, Rügenwalde, and Stolp. In 1307, they launched a campaign from the region against the fortified castle of Gdańsk in Pomerelia. The attack failed, however, as the local warlord, Wŀadisŀaw Ŀokietek, had recruited soldiers of the Teutonic Knights to help defending it.

Following the Teutonic takeover of Danzig in November 1308, during which the Knights seized the city and allegedly slaughtered many of the inhabitants, the Ascanian Margrave Waldemar of Brandenburg-Stendal sold his claims to Pomerelia east of the Łeba River to the Teutonic Order for 10,000 silver marks by the Treaty of Soldin, but retained Schlawe-Stolp. Grand Master Siegfried von Feuchtwangen and Master Heinrich von Dirschau und Schwetz integrated the remaining Gdańsk Pomerania into their Monastic State. Emperor Henry VII ratified the Soldin Treaty in 1313, and, although he could not assert any feudal claims to the territory of the extinct Samboride dukes, the now Brandenburgian lands of Schlawe and Stolp finally were incorporated into the Holy Roman Empire.

=== Duchy of Pomerania ===
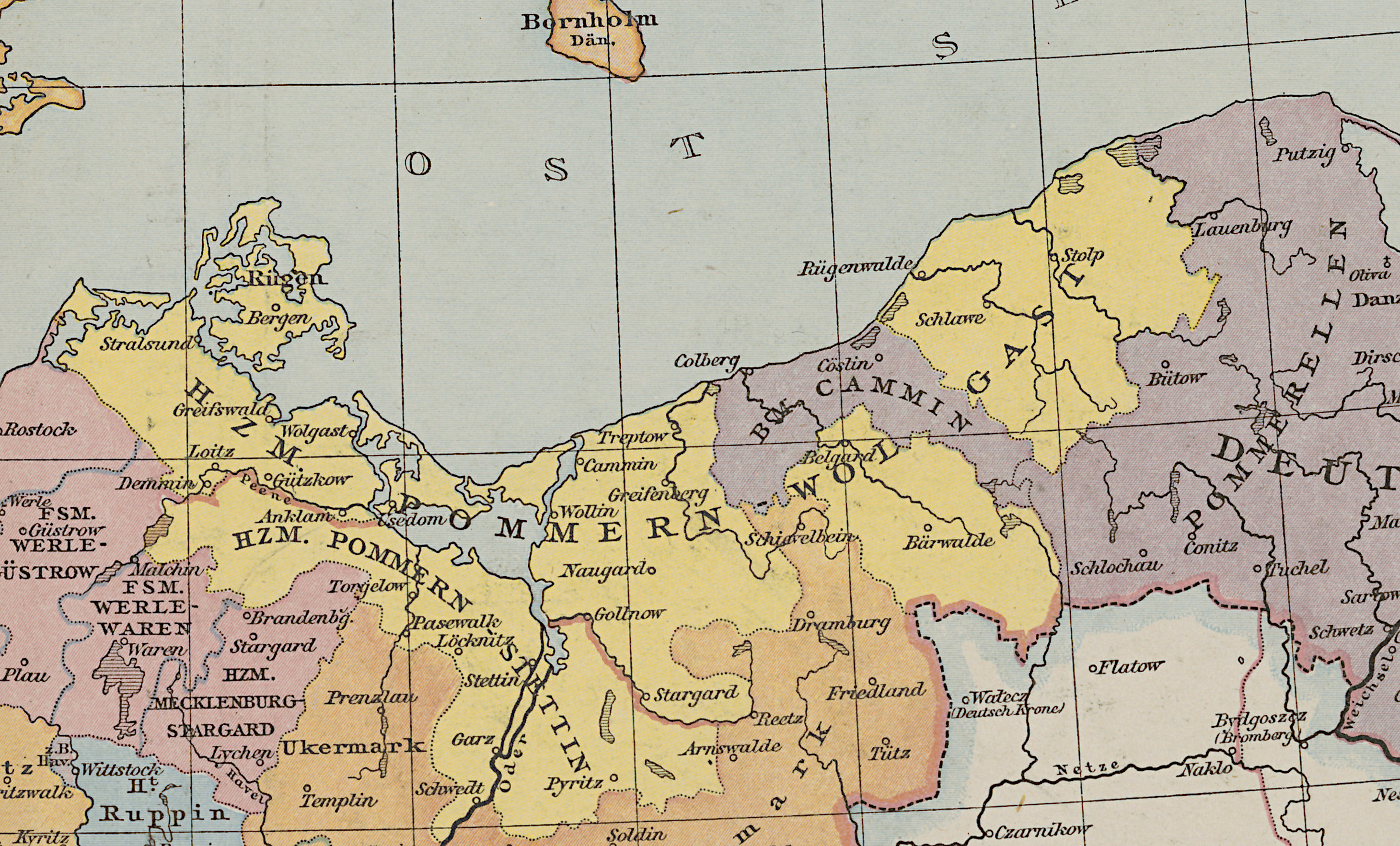
Schlawe and Stolp as part of the Duchy of Pomerania-Wolgast, about 1400

The districts of Schlawe (now Sławno), Rügenwalde (Darłowo), and Stolp (Słupsk), remained with the Margraviate of Brandenburg and were ruled by the margraves' vassals, the Swienca family, who had administered the area previously under other dynasties. Following the 1317 Treaty of Templin, the Griffin duke Wartislaw IV of Pomerania-Wolgast took over these areas as a fief from Margrave Waldemar of Brandenburg. In 1347, the area became fully attached to the Duchy of Pomerania-Wolgast. The lands of Stolp were pawned to the Teutonic Order from 1329 to 1341, while the Bütow area was bought by the Order in 1329 and thus remained outside Pomerania-Wolgast.

The lands of Schlawe and Stolp became part of the Duchy of Pomerania-Stolp after the partition of the Pomeranian duchy in 1368. While the Pomerelian lands were incorporated into the Polish province of Royal Prussia in 1466, the eastern border of the lands of Schlawe and Stolp with Pomerelia shifted several times before they, together with adjacent Lauenburg and Bütow Land, were integrated into the Prussian Province of Pomerania in 1653.

== See also ==
- Duchy of Pomerania
- History of Pomerania
- List of Pomeranian duchies and dukes

== Citations ==
=== Bibliography ===
- Srodecki, Paul; Kersken, Norbert; Petrauskas, Rimvydas (2022). Unions and Divisions: New Forms of Rule in Medieval and Renaissance Europe. Abington: Routledge. p. 201. doi:10.4324/9781003199007. ISBN 9781032057507.
- Pearlbach, M (1882). Pommerellisches Urkundenbuch [Pomerelian Book of Documents] (in German and Latin). Vol. 2. Danzig: Westpreussischen Geschichtsverein. pp. 539, 551, 555, 677.
- Zakrzewski, Ignacy, ed. (1878). Codex diplomaticus Majoris Poloniæ documenta, et jam typis descripta, et adhuc inedita complectens, annum 1400 attingentia [Codex diplomaticus of Greater Poland: documents, including both already printed and still unpublished, reaching the year 1400] (in Latin and Polish). Vol. 2. Poznan: Societatis Literaria Poznaniensis. pp. XXII, 212, 223.
- Grünhagen, Colmar (1884). Geschichte Schlesiens [History of Silesia] (in German). Vol. 1. Poznan: Gotha: F.A. Perthes. pp. 130, 430, 53.
