= Mielenko =

Mielenko may refer to the following places in Poland:

- Mielenko, Kuyavian-Pomeranian Voivodeship
- Mielenko, West Pomeranian Voivodeship
- Mielenko Drawskie
- Mielenko Gryfińskie
- Mielenko-Kolonia
