= Czajcze =

Czajcze may refer to:

- Czajcze, Piła County in Greater Poland Voivodeship (west-central Poland)
- Czajcze, Złotów County in Greater Poland Voivodeship (west-central Poland)
- Czajcze, West Pomeranian Voivodeship (north-west Poland)
