= Policko, Koszalin County =

Policko
- Village
- Location within Poland
- Coordinates: 54°10′11″N 16°19′24″E
- Country: Poland
- Voivodeship: West Pomeranian
- County: Koszalin
- Gmina: Manowo

Policko [pɔˈlit͡skɔ] (German: Eckerndaus) is a village in the administrative district of Gmina Manowo, within Koszalin County, West Pomeranian Voivodeship, in north-western Poland. It lies approximately 6 km (4 mi) north of Manowo, 10 km (6 mi) east of Koszalin, and 142 km (88 mi) north-east of the regional capital Szczecin.

For the history of the region, see History of Pomerania.
