= Wyszewo =

- Village
- Location within Poland
- Coordinates: 54°7′N 16°22′E
- Country: Poland
- Voivodeship: West Pomeranian
- County: Koszalin
- Gmina: Manowo

Wyszewo [vɨˈʂɛvɔ] (German: Seidel) is a village in the administrative district of Gmina Manowo, within Koszalin County, West Pomeranian Voivodeship, in north-western Poland. It lies approximately 5 km (3 mi) east of Manowo, 15 km (9 mi) south-east of Koszalin, and 141 km (88 mi) north-east of the regional capital Szczecin.

For the history of the region, see History of Pomerania.

The Wyszewka river flows nearby.
