= Grzybniczka =

- Settlement
- Location within Poland
- Coordinates: 54°3′N 16°25′E
- Country: Poland
- Voivodeship: West Pomeranian
- County: Koszalin
- Gmina: Manowo

Grzybniczka [ɡʐɨbˈnit͡ʂka] (German: Neu Griebnitz) is a settlement in the administrative district of Gmina Manowo, within Koszalin County, West Pomeranian Voivodeship, in north-western Poland. It lies approximately 13 km (8 mi) south-east of Manowo, 22 km (14 mi) south-east of Koszalin, and 140 km (87 mi) north-east of the regional capital Szczecin.

For the history of the region, see History of Pomerania.
