= Bonin, Koszalin County =

Bonin
- Village
- Location within Poland
- Coordinates: 54°9′2″N 16°15′27″E
- Country: Poland
- Voivodeship: West Pomeranian
- County: Koszalin
- Gmina: Manowo
- Population: 1,300

Bonin [ˈbɔnin] (German: Bonin) is a village in the administrative district of Gmina Manowo, within Koszalin County, West Pomeranian Voivodeship, in north-western Poland. It lies approximately 5 km (3 mi) north-west of Manowo, 7 km (4 mi) south-east of Koszalin, and 137 km (85 mi) north-east of the regional capital Szczecin. In Bonin is placed Department of Potato Protection and Seed Science, formerly Potato Research Institute, now part of Plant Breeding and Acclimatization Institute.

The village has a population of 1,300.

You can travel there with Koszalin's 8 bus.
