= Poniki, West Pomeranian Voivodeship =

Poniki
- Settlement
- Location within Poland
- Coordinates: 54°5′N 16°24′E
- Country: Poland
- Voivodeship: West Pomeranian
- County: Koszalin
- Gmina: Manowo

Poniki [pɔˈniki] (German: Ponicken) is a settlement in the administrative district of Gmina Manowo, within Koszalin County, West Pomeranian Voivodeship, in north-western Poland. It lies approximately 10 km (6 mi) south-east of Manowo, 18 km (11 mi) south-east of Koszalin, and 141 km (88 mi) north-east of the regional capital Szczecin.

For the history of the region, see History of Pomerania.
