= Kretomino =

- Village
- Location within Poland
- Coordinates: 54°10′N 16°13′E
- Country: Poland
- Voivodeship: West Pomeranian
- County: Koszalin
- Gmina: Manowo
- Population: 410

Kretomino [krɛtɔˈminɔ] (formerly German Krettmin) is a village in the administrative district of Gmina Manowo, within Koszalin County, West Pomeranian Voivodeship, in north-western Poland. It lies approximately 6 km (4 mi) north-west of Manowo, 3 km (2 mi) south-east of Koszalin, and 136 km (85 mi) north-east of the regional capital Szczecin. It is located near the national road No 11, which connects Kołobrzeg and Bytom. There is a bus connection between Kretomino and the downtown Koszalin (line no 8).

For the history of the region, see History of Pomerania.

The village has a population of 410.
