= Barnowo =

Barnowo refers to the following places in Poland:

- Barnowo, Pomeranian Voivodeship
- Barnowo, West Pomeranian Voivodeship
