= Jagielno =

Jagielno may refer to the following places in Poland:

- Jagielno, Lower Silesian Voivodeship (south-west Poland)
- Jagielno, West Pomeranian Voivodeship (north-west Poland)
