= Grzybnica, Koszalin County =

Grzybnica
- Village
- Location within Poland
- Coordinates: 54°3′N 16°27′E
- Country: Poland
- Voivodeship: West Pomeranian
- County: Koszalin
- Gmina: Manowo
- Population: 190

Grzybnica [ɡʐɨbˈnit͡sa] (German: Alt Griebnitz) is a village in the administrative district of Gmina Manowo, within Koszalin County, West Pomeranian Voivodeship, in north-western Poland. It lies approximately 15 km (9 mi) south-east of Manowo, 23 km (14 mi) south-east of Koszalin, and 142 km (88 mi) north-east of the regional capital Szczecin.

The village has a population of 190.

An archaeological site, located about 2.5 km (2 mi) north of the village, consists of stone circles, barrow burials, and stone pavements. It belongs to the Wielbark culture related to the presence of Goths in Pomerania and is dated to I–III centuries CE.
