= Dęborogi =

- Village
- Location within Poland
- Coordinates: 54°9′44″N 16°20′52″E
- Country: Poland
- Voivodeship: West Pomeranian
- County: Koszalin
- Gmina: Manowo
- Population: 30

Dęborogi [dɛmbɔˈrɔɡi] (German: Hoheneichen) is a village in the administrative district of Gmina Manowo, within Koszalin County, West Pomeranian Voivodeship, in north-western Poland. It lies approximately 6 km (4 mi) north-east of Manowo, 11 km (7 mi) east of Koszalin, and 143 km (89 mi) north-east of the regional capital Szczecin.

The village has a population of 30.
