= Cewlino =

- Village
- Location within Poland
- Coordinates: 54°7′N 16°15′E
- Country: Poland
- Voivodeship: West Pomeranian
- County: Koszalin
- Gmina: Manowo

Cewlino [t͡sɛˈvlinɔ] (German: Zewelin) is a village in the administrative district of Gmina Manowo, within Koszalin County, West Pomeranian Voivodeship, in north-western Poland. It lies approximately 4 km (2 mi) west of Manowo, 9 km (6 mi) south-east of Koszalin, and 135 km (84 mi) north-east of the regional capital Szczecin.

== See also ==
History of Pomerania
