= Kopanino, West Pomeranian Voivodeship =

Kopanino
- Village
- Location within Poland
- Coordinates: 54°2′55″N 16°22′57″E
- Country: Poland
- Voivodeship: West Pomeranian
- County: Koszalin
- Gmina: Manowo

Kopanino [kɔpaˈninɔ] (German: Koppelsberg) is a village in the administrative district of Gmina Manowo, within Koszalin County, West Pomeranian Voivodeship, in north-western Poland. It lies approximately 10 km (6 mi) south-east of Manowo, 20 km (12 mi) south-east of Koszalin, and 138 km (86 mi) north-east of the regional capital Szczecin.

For the history of the region, see History of Pomerania.
