= Rudna, Piła County =

Rudna
- Village
- Location within Poland
- Coordinates: 53°11′59″N 17°1′14″E
- Country: Poland
- Voivodeship: Greater Poland
- County: Piła
- Gmina: Wysoka
- First mentioned: 1480
- Time zone: UTC+1 (CET)
  - Summer (DST): UTC+2 (CEST)
- Postal code: 89-320
- Area code: +48 67
- Car plates: PP

Rudna [ˈrudna] is a village in the administrative district of Gmina Wysoka, within Piła County, Greater Poland Voivodeship, in west-central Poland.

The oldest known mention of Rudna dates back to 1480, when it was part of the Crown of the Kingdom of Poland. During the German occupation of Poland during World War II, some Polish inhabitants of Rudna, were murdered by the Germans on the slope of the Góra Wysoka hill in nearby Wysoka in two mass executions on 21 October and 21 November (see Nazi crimes against the Polish nation).

There is a church of Saints Peter and Paul in the village.
