= Mostowo, West Pomeranian Voivodeship =

Mostowo
- Village
- Location within Poland
- Coordinates: 54°4′N 16°23′E
- Country: Poland
- Voivodeship: West Pomeranian
- County: Koszalin
- Gmina: Manowo

Mostowo [mɔsˈtɔvɔ] (German: Brückenkrug) is a village in the administrative district of Gmina Manowo, within Koszalin County, West Pomeranian Voivodeship, in north-western Poland. It lies approximately 10 km (6 mi) south-east of Manowo, 19 km (12 mi) south-east of Koszalin, and 139 km (86 mi) north-east of the regional capital Szczecin.

For the history of the region, see History of Pomerania.
