= Radzichowo =

- Settlement
- Location within Poland
- Coordinates: 54°14′19″N 16°0′51″E
- Country: Poland
- Voivodeship: West Pomeranian
- County: Koszalin
- Gmina: Mielno

Radzichowo [rad͡ʑiˈxɔvɔ] (German: Idashof) is a settlement in the administrative district of Gmina Mielno, within Koszalin County, West Pomeranian Voivodeship, in north-western Poland.

== See also ==
History of Pomerania
