= Gmurowo =

- Village
- Location within Poland
- Coordinates: 53°13′23″N 17°2′4″E
- Country: Poland
- Voivodeship: Greater Poland
- County: Piła
- Gmina: Wysoka
- Population: 90

Gmurowo [ɡmuˈrɔvɔ] is a village in the administrative district of Gmina Wysoka, within Piła County, Greater Poland Voivodeship, in west-central Poland.
