= Wysoka Wielka, Greater Poland Voivodeship =

Wysoka Wielka
- Village
- Location within Poland
- Coordinates: 53°10′20″N 17°03′41″E
- Country: Poland
- Voivodeship: Greater Poland
- County: Piła
- Gmina: Wysoka

Wysoka Wielka [vɨˈsɔka ˈvjɛlka] is a village in the administrative district of Gmina Wysoka, within Piła County, Greater Poland Voivodeship, in west-central Poland.
