= Gajewo, Koszalin County =

Gajewo
- Settlement
- Location within Poland
- Coordinates: 54°04′42″N 16°28′25″E
- Country: Poland
- Voivodeship: West Pomeranian
- County: Koszalin
- Gmina: Manowo

Gajewo [ɡaˈjɛvɔ] (German: Grünhaus) is a settlement in the administrative district of Gmina Manowo, within Koszalin County, West Pomeranian Voivodeship, in north-western Poland.
