= Czajcze, Piła County =

Czajcze
- Village
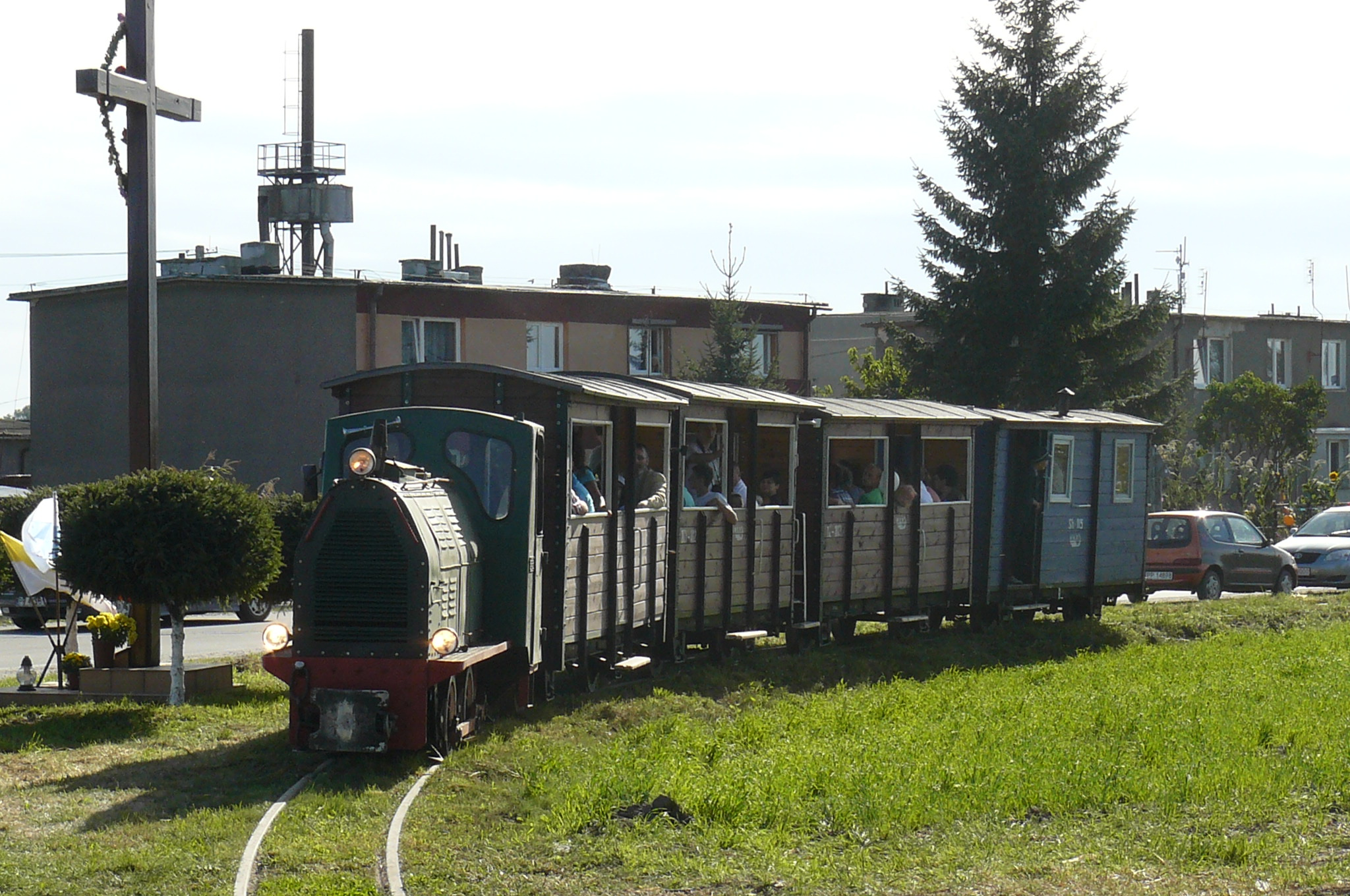
- Historic narrow-gauge railway in Czajcze

- Location within Poland
- Coordinates: 53°11′26″N 17°07′20″E
- Country: Poland
- Voivodeship: Greater Poland
- County: Piła
- Gmina: Wysoka
- First mentioned: 1427
- Time zone: UTC+01:00 (CET)
  - Summer (DST): UTC+02:00 (CEST)
- Postal code: 89-320
- Area code: +48 67
- Car plates: PP

Czajcze [ˈt͡ʂai̯t͡ʂɛ] is a village in the administrative district of Gmina Wysoka, within Piła County, Greater Poland Voivodeship, in west-central Poland.

The oldest known mention of Czajcze dates back to 1427, when it was part of the Crown of the Kingdom of Poland. During the German occupation of Poland during World War II, some Polish inhabitants of Czajcze, were murdered by the Germans on the slope of the Góra Wysoka hill in nearby Wysoka in two mass executions on October 21 and November 21 (see Nazi crimes against the Polish nation).

There is a historic palace and a historic narrow-gauge railway station in the village.

== Notable residents ==
- Albert Graf von der Goltz (1893–1944), German military officer
