= Rosnowo, Koszalin County =

Rosnowo
- Village
- Location within Poland
- Coordinates: 54°4′23″N 16°17′33″E
- Country: Poland
- Voivodeship: West Pomeranian
- County: Koszalin
- Gmina: Manowo
- Population: 2,300
- Website: http://www.rosnowo.pl/

Rosnowo [rɔsˈnɔvɔ] (formerly German Roßnow) is a village in the administrative district of Gmina Manowo, within Koszalin County, West Pomeranian Voivodeship, in north-western Poland. It lies approximately 6 km (4 mi) south of Manowo, 15 km (9 mi) south-east of Koszalin, and 135 km (84 mi) north-east of the regional capital Szczecin.

For the history of the region, see History of Pomerania.

The village has a population of 2,300.
