= Pękalin, West Pomeranian Voivodeship =

Pękalin
- Settlement
- Location within Poland
- Coordinates: 54°14′12″N 15°56′40″E
- Country: Poland
- Voivodeship: West Pomeranian
- County: Koszalin
- Gmina: Mielno

Pękalin [pɛnˈkalin] (German: Ellerhof) is a settlement in the administrative district of Gmina Mielno, within Koszalin County, West Pomeranian Voivodeship, in north-western Poland.
