= Mielno =

- Town
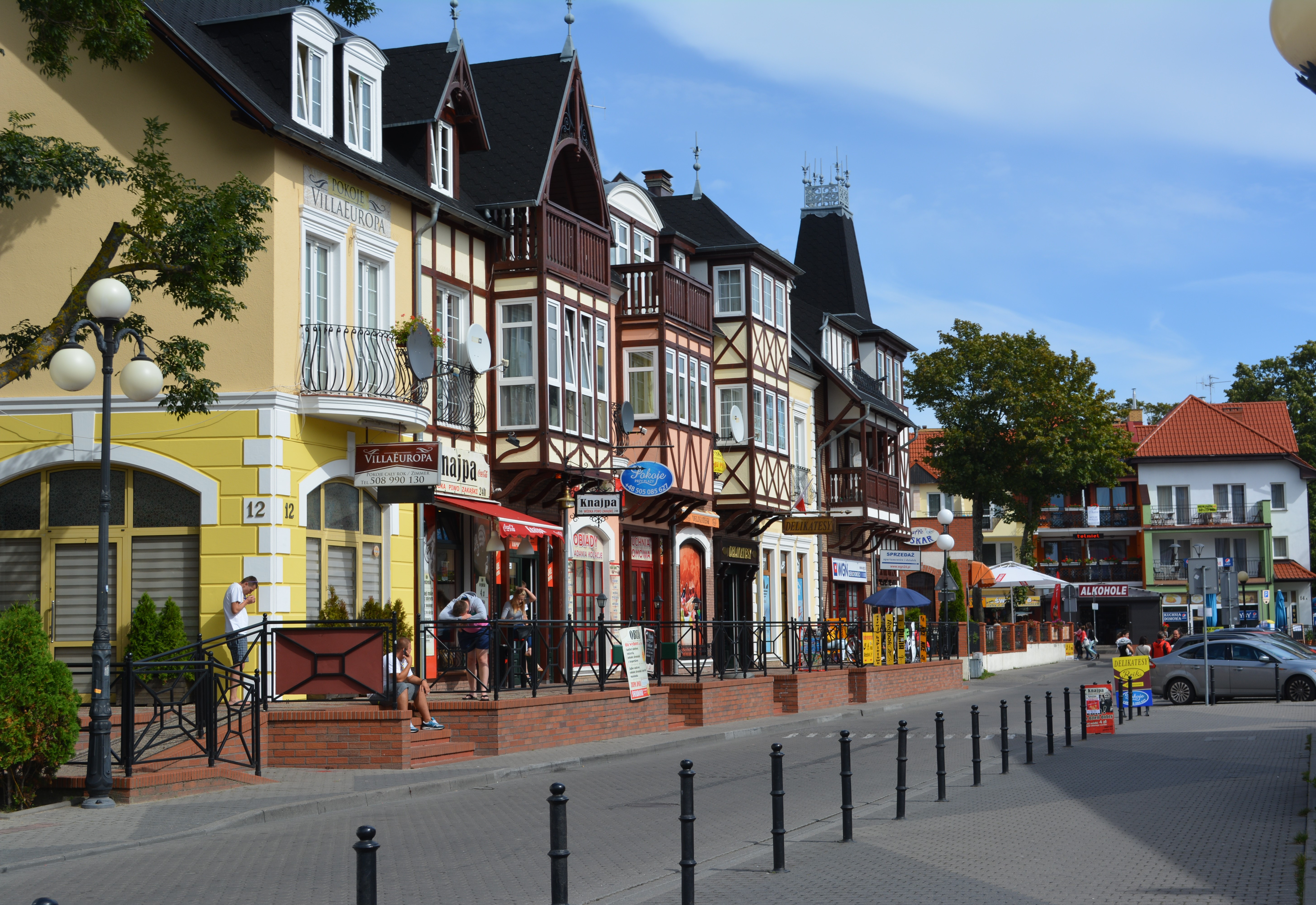
- Beach-side architecture

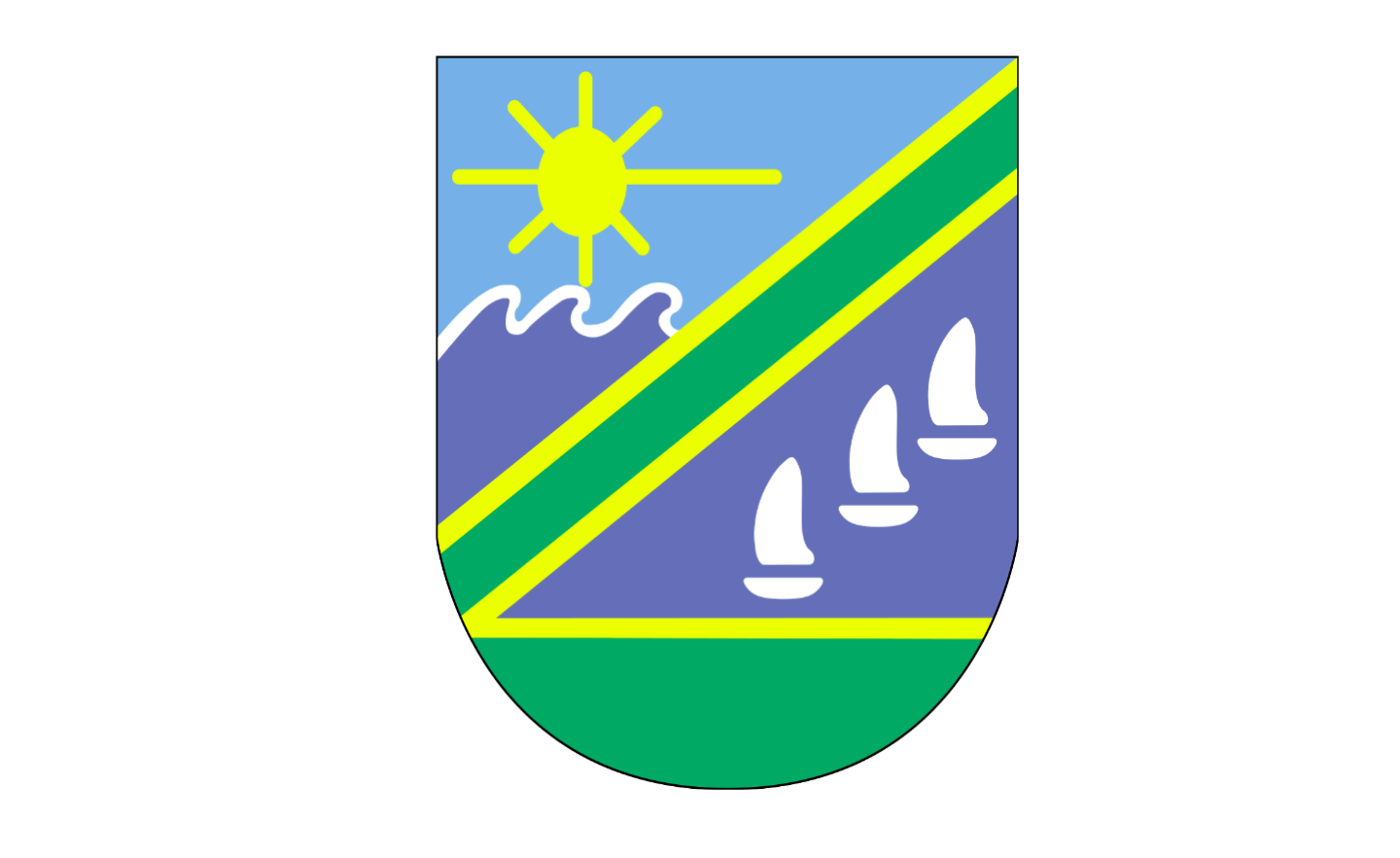
- Flag Coat of arms

- Location within Poland
- Coordinates: 54°15′36″N 16°3′39″E
- Country: Poland
- Voivodeship: West Pomeranian
- County: Koszalin
- Gmina: Mielno
- Highest elevation: 10 m (33 ft)
- Lowest elevation: 1 m (3.3 ft)
- Population (2015): 3,174
- Time zone: UTC+1 (CET)
  - Summer (DST): UTC+2 (CEST)
- Vehicle registration: ZKO
- Website: https://www.mielno.pl

Mielno (/ˈmjɛlnoʊ/ MYEL-noh; former German: Groß Möllen or Großmöllen) is a resort town in Koszalin County, West Pomeranian Voivodeship, in north-western Poland. It is the seat of the gmina (administrative district) called Gmina Mielno. It lies approximately 12 km (7 mi) north-west of Koszalin and 135 km (84 mi) north-east of the regional capital Szczecin. The town has a population of 3,200.

Mielno is a well-known tourist destination with sandy beaches on the Baltic Sea coast. It lies on a spit between the sea and the large Jamno lake. It is contiguous with the neighbouring resort of Unieście.

== Nuclear power plant controversy ==
The nearby village of Gąski is one of three sites selected by Polish power company PGE in November 2011 to host a nuclear power station with a capacity of 3 gigawatts. In February 2012, residents voted overwhelmingly against the plan. Some 94 percent of the 2,389 people who took part in a referendum opposed the plant and only 5 percent supported it.

== Notable people ==
- Reni Jusis (born 1974 in Konin, raised in Mielno) is a female Polish pop singer, songwriter and producer.

== Gallery ==
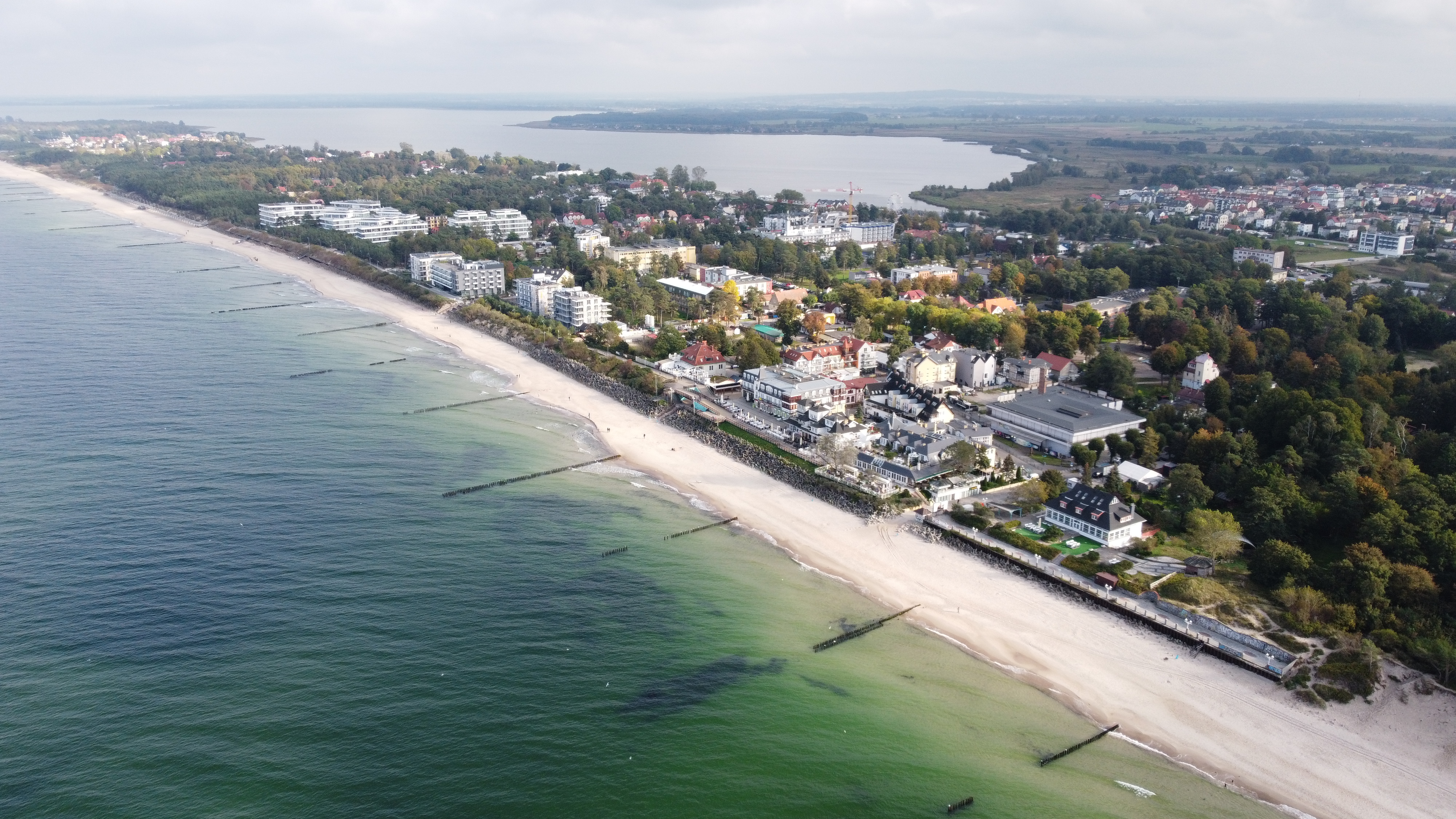
Aerial view

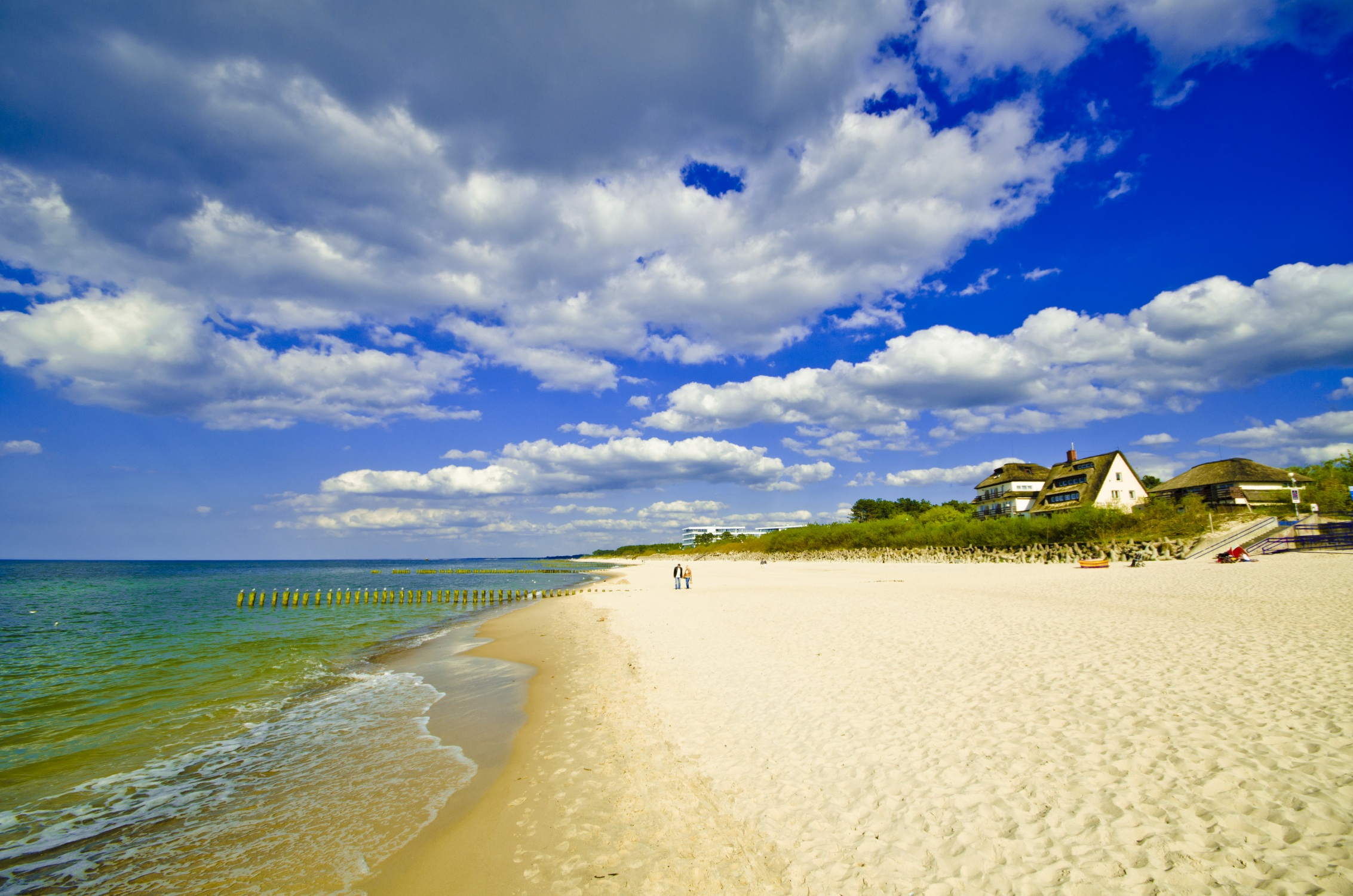
Mielno beach

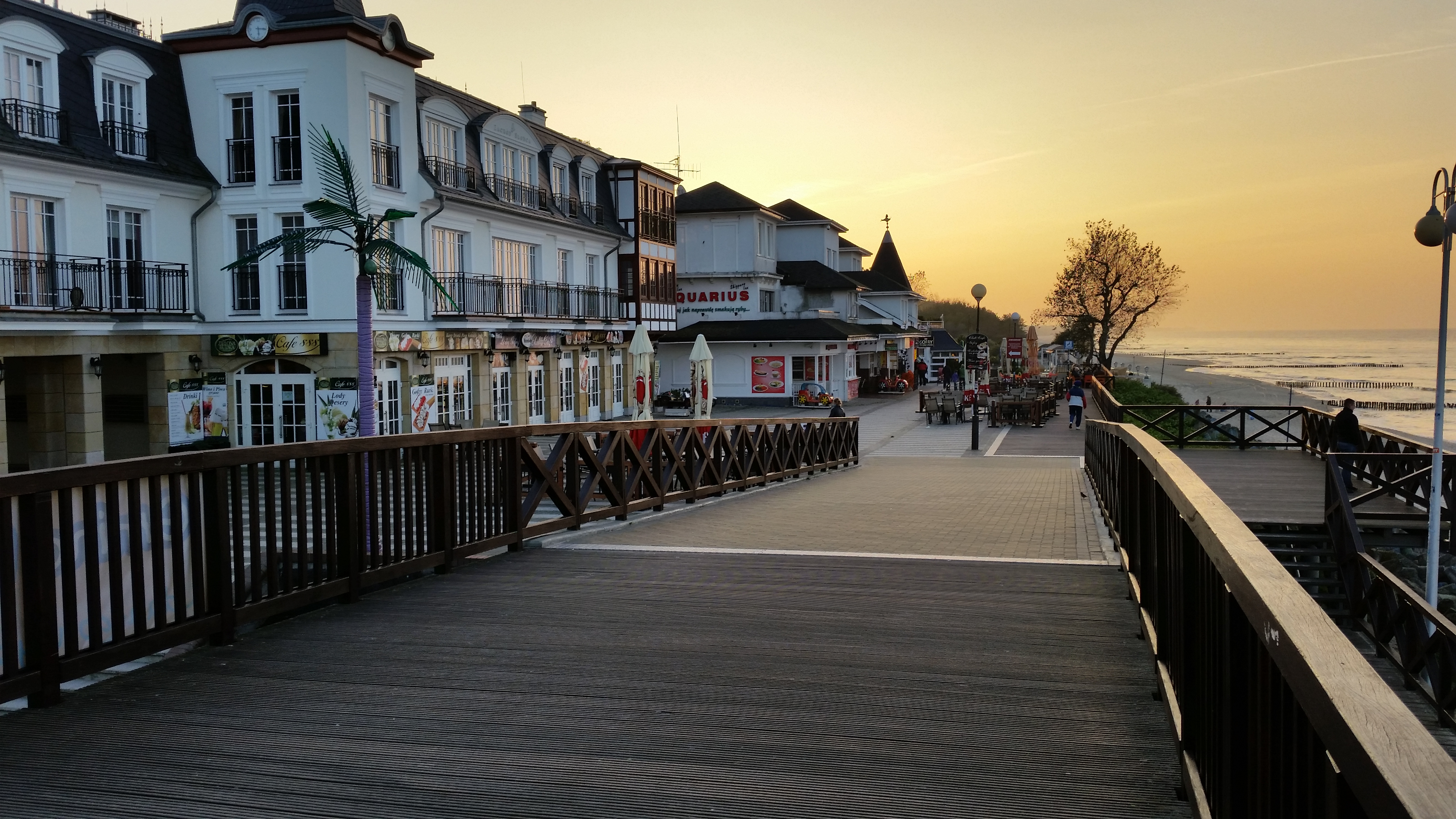
Promenade

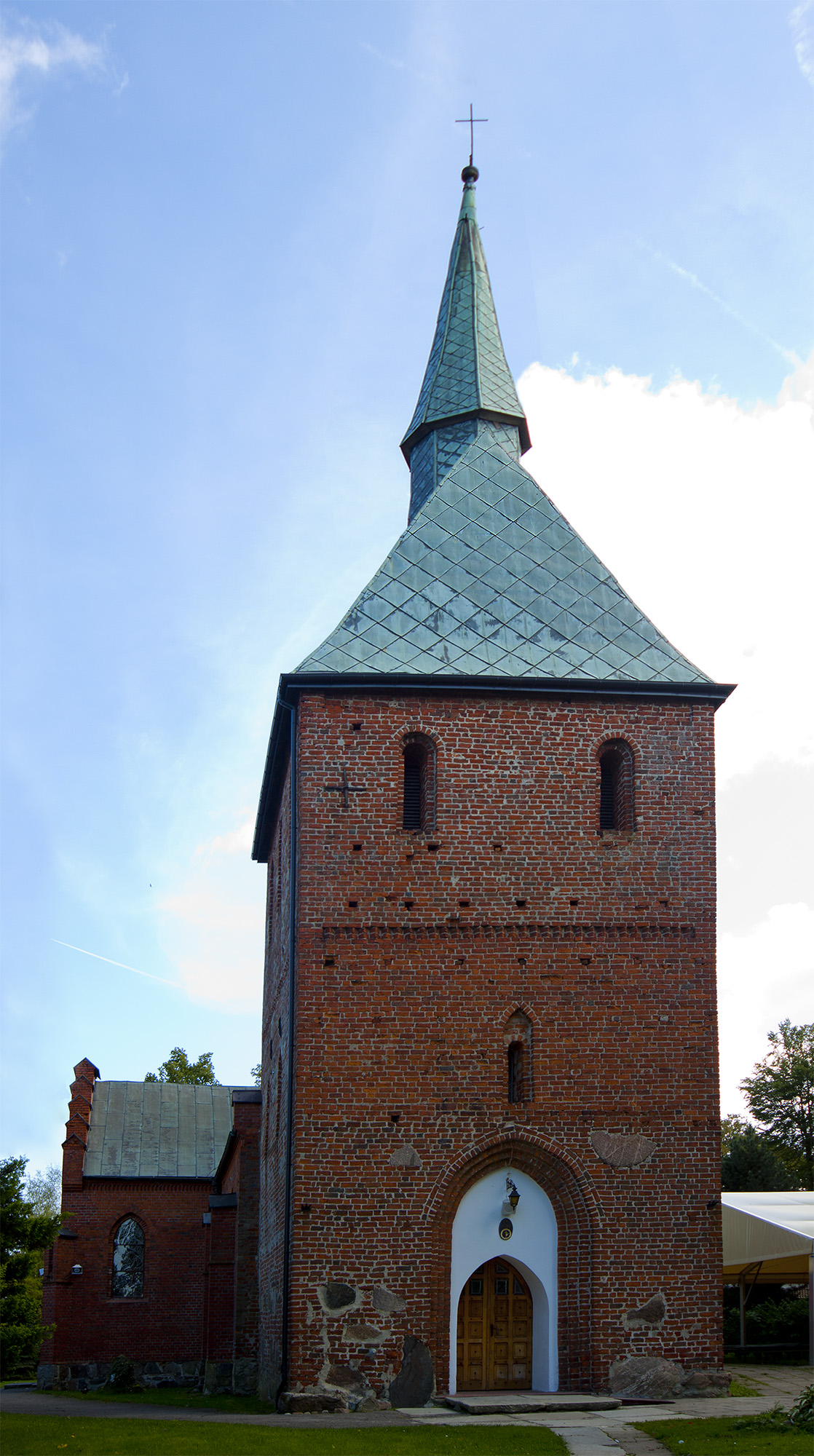
Church of the Transfiguration
