= Sarbinowo, Koszalin County =

Sarbinowo
- Village
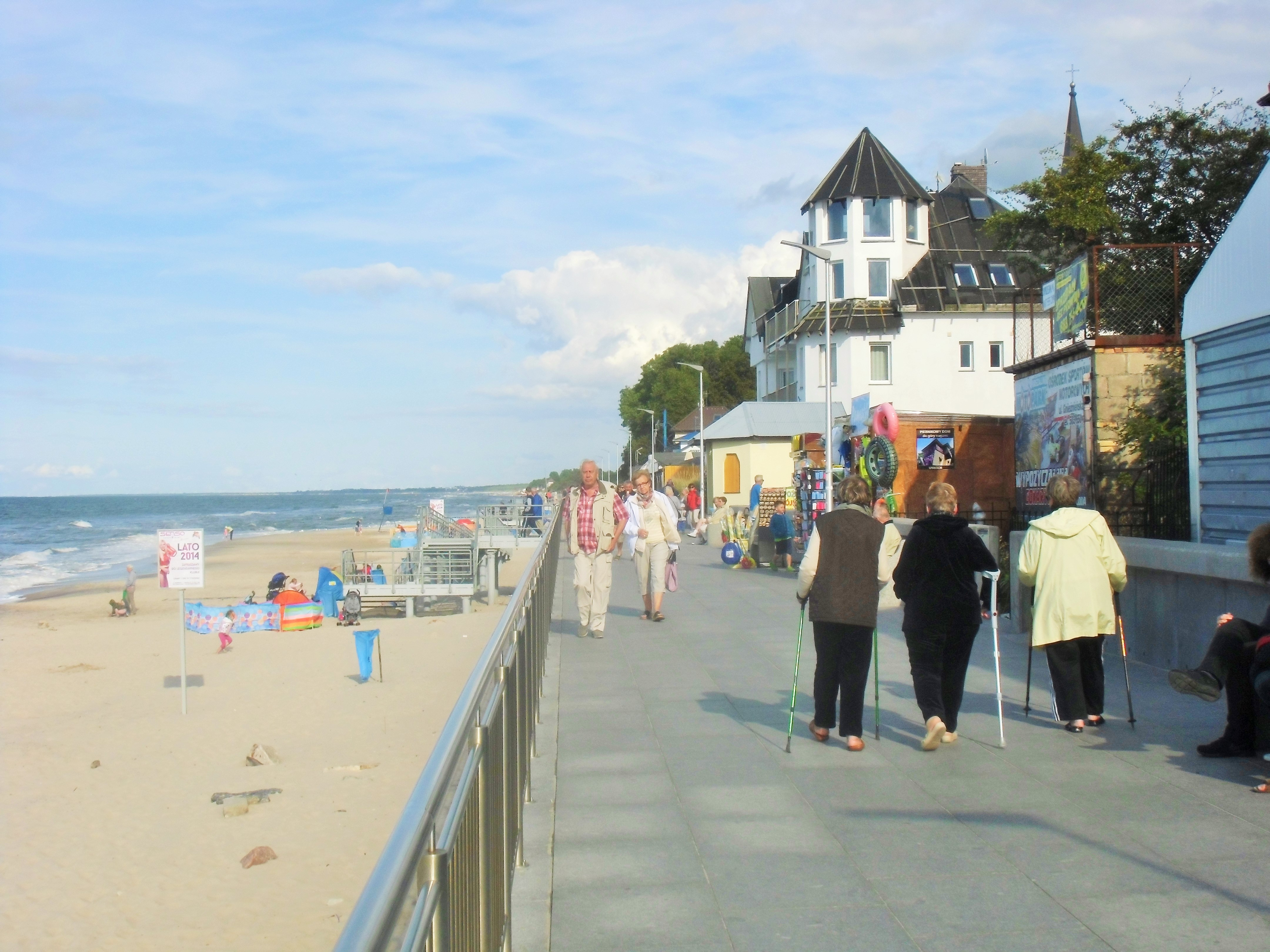
- Seaside promenade

- Location within Poland
- Coordinates: 54°14′55″N 15°57′28″E
- Country: Poland
- Voivodeship: West Pomeranian
- County: Koszalin
- Gmina: Mielno
- Population: 500

Sarbinowo [sarbiˈnɔvɔ] (German: Sorenbohm) is a village in the administrative district of Gmina Mielno, within Koszalin County, West Pomeranian Voivodeship, in north-western Poland. It lies approximately 17 km (11 mi) north-west of Koszalin and 130 km (81 mi) north-east of the regional capital Szczecin.

Before 1637 the area was part of Duchy of Pomerania. For the history of the region, see History of Pomerania. The village has a population of 558.

The village has an amateur football team called Santos Sarbinowo, inspired by the Brazilian club Santos FC.

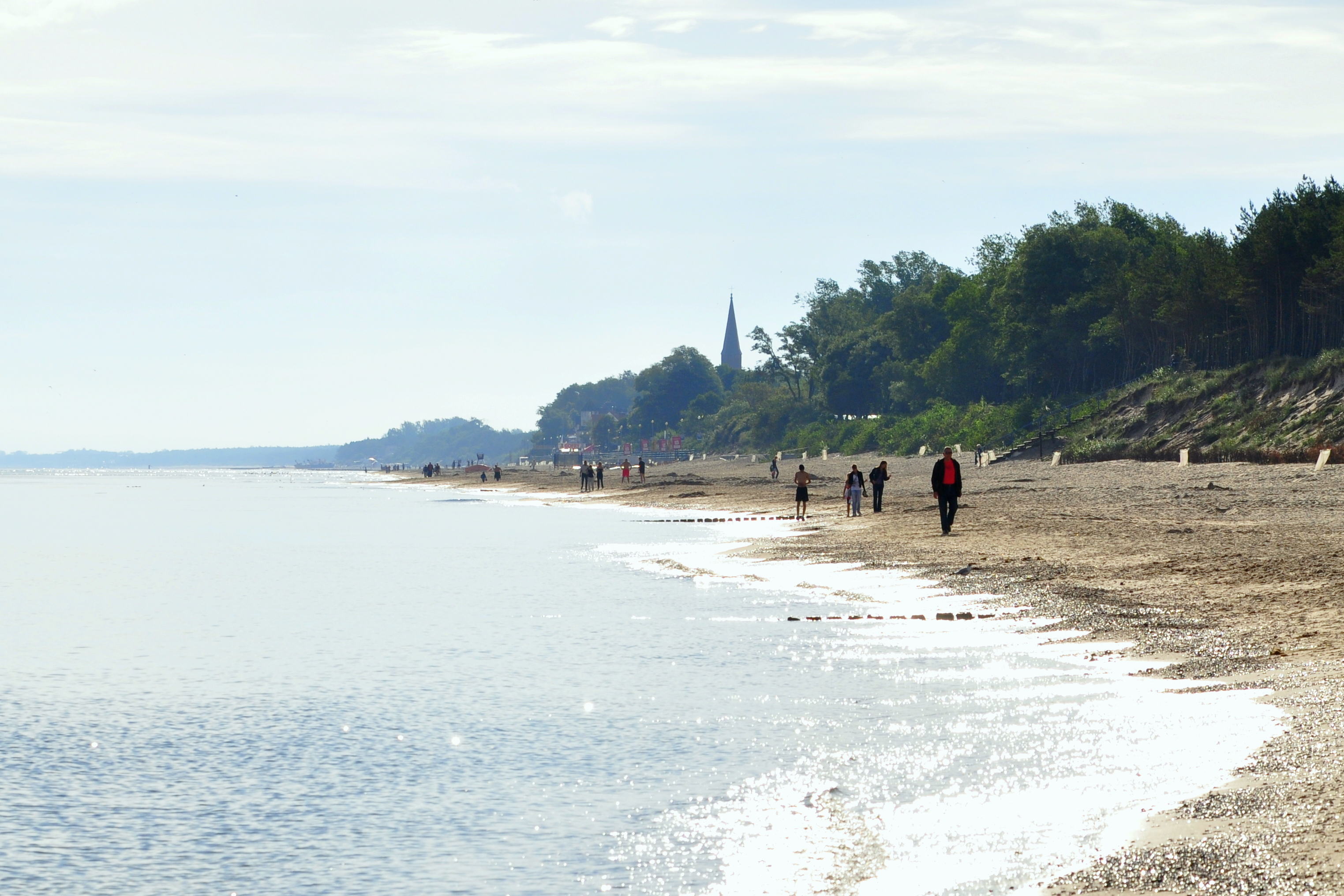

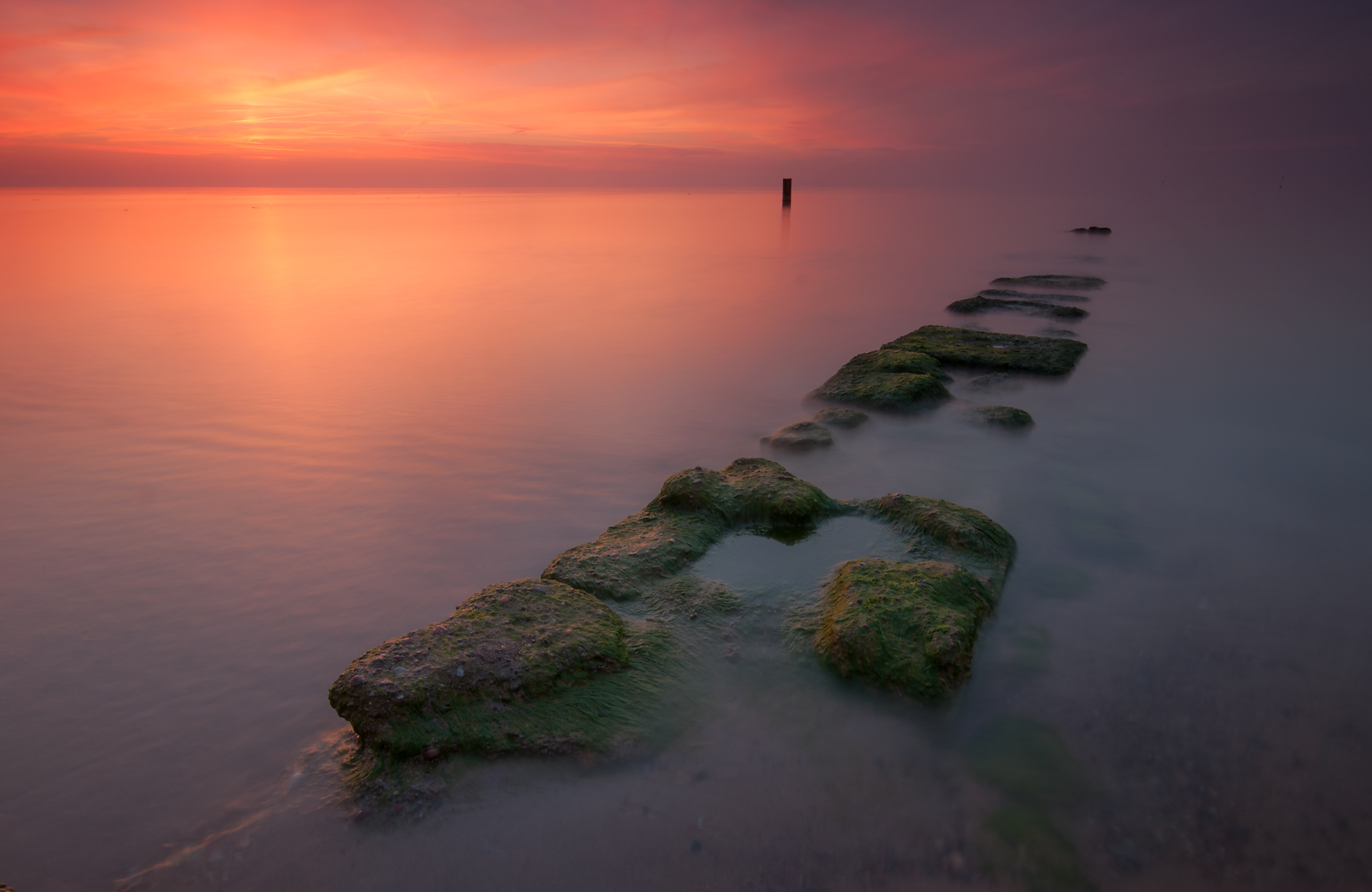
Breakwaters of Sarbinowo at sunset
