= Sędziniec =

- Village
- Location within Poland
- Coordinates: 53°11′41″N 17°04′21″E
- Country: Poland
- Voivodeship: Greater Poland
- County: Piła
- Gmina: Wysoka

Sędziniec [sɛnˈd͡ʑiɲɛt͡s] is a village in the administrative district of Gmina Wysoka, within Piła County, Greater Poland Voivodeship, in west-central Poland.
