= Wyszebórz =

- Village
- Location within Poland
- Coordinates: 54°9′N 16°20′E
- Country: Poland
- Voivodeship: West Pomeranian
- County: Koszalin
- Gmina: Manowo

Wyszebórz [vɨˈʂɛbuʂ] (German: Wisbuhr) is a village in the administrative district of Gmina Manowo, within Koszalin County, West Pomeranian Voivodeship, in north-western Poland. It lies approximately 4 km (2 mi) north-east of Manowo, 11 km (7 mi) east of Koszalin, and 141 km (88 mi) north-east of the regional capital Szczecin.

For the history of the region, see History of Pomerania.

In the years 1975-1998 the town administratively belonged to the province of Koszalin.
