= Stare, Piła County =

Stare
- Village
- Location within Poland
- Coordinates: 53°14′N 17°0′E
- Country: Poland
- Voivodeship: Greater Poland
- County: Piła
- Gmina: Wysoka

Stare [ˈstarɛ] is a village in the administrative district of Gmina Wysoka, within Piła County, Greater Poland Voivodeship, in west-central Poland.
