= Kostrzynek =

- Village
- Location within Poland
- Coordinates: 53°11′26″N 16°59′25″E
- Country: Poland
- Voivodeship: Greater Poland
- County: Piła
- Gmina: Wysoka

Kostrzynek [kɔsˈtʂɨnɛk] is a village in the administrative district of Gmina Wysoka, within Piła County, Greater Poland Voivodeship, in west-central Poland.

When this area was part of Prussia, it was known as Künstrinchen or Küstrinchen.
