= Gmina Mielno =

Gmina Mielno Mielno Commune
- Gmina
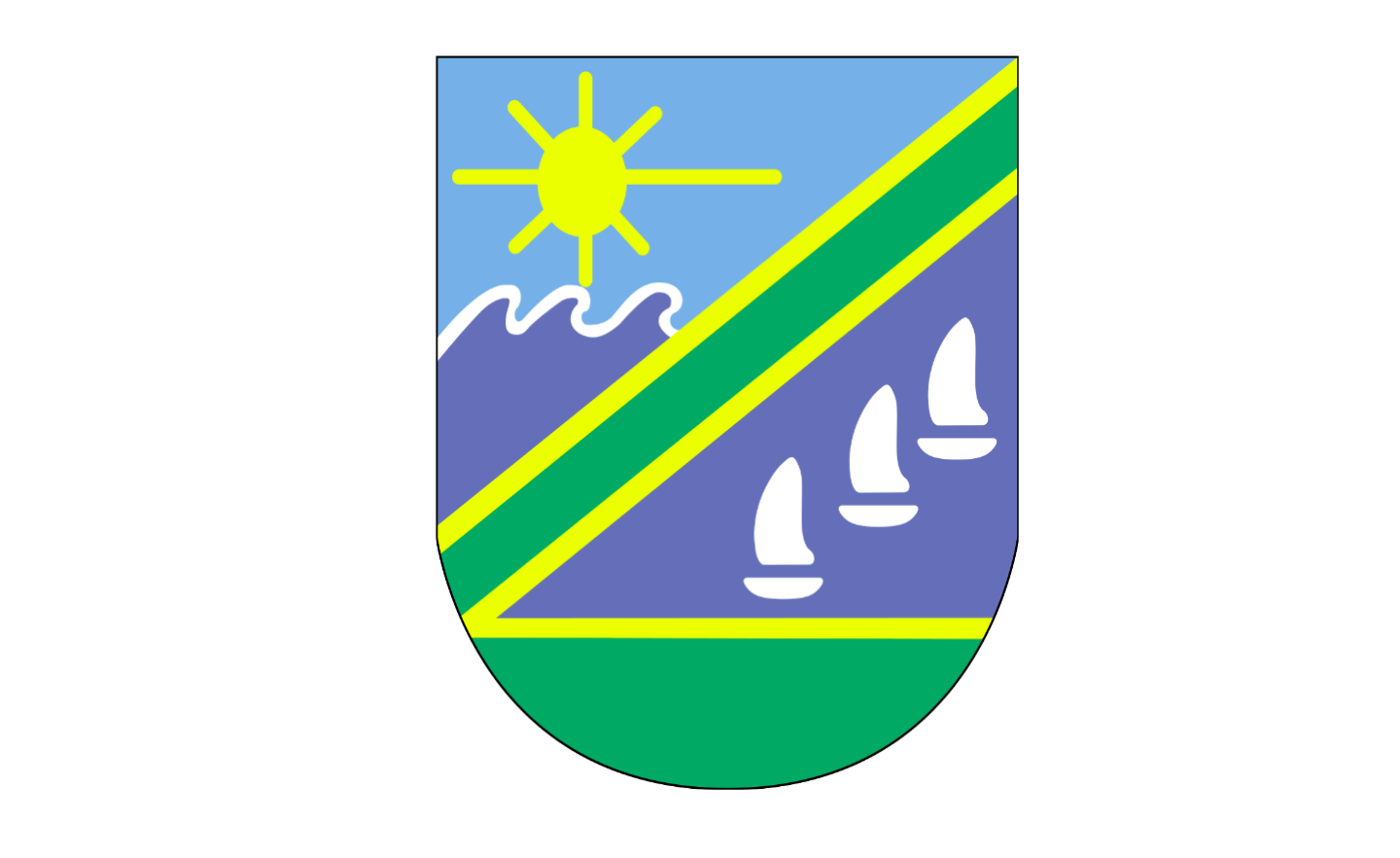
- Flag Coat of arms
- Interactive map of Gmina Mielno
- Coordinates (Mielno): 54°15′36″N 16°3′39″E
- Country: Poland
- Voivodeship: West Pomeranian
- County: Koszalin County
- Seat: Mielno

Area
  - Total: 62.54 km^{2} (24.15 sq mi)

Population (2006)
  - Total: 5,068
  - Density: 81.04/km^{2} (209.9/sq mi)
- Website: https://www.mielno.pl/

Gmina Mielno is an urban-rural gmina (administrative district) in Koszalin County, West Pomeranian Voivodeship, in north-western Poland. Its seat is the village of Mielno, a resort on the Baltic Sea coast.

The gmina covers an area of 62.54 square kilometres (24.1 sq mi), and as of 2006 its total population is 5,068.

== Villages ==
Gmina Mielno contains the villages and settlements of Barnowo, Chłopy, Czajcze, Gąski, Komorniki, Łazy, Mielenko, Mielenko-Kolonia, Mielno, Niegoszcz, Paprotno, Pękalin, Radzichowo, Sarbinowo and Unieście.

== Neighbouring gminas ==
Gmina Mielno is bordered by the gminas of Będzino, Darłowo and Sianów.
