= Kopanica, West Pomeranian Voivodeship =

Kopanica
- Settlement
- Location within Poland
- Coordinates: 54°06′24″N 16°13′02″E
- Country: Poland
- Voivodeship: West Pomeranian
- County: Koszalin
- Gmina: Manowo

Kopanica [kɔpaˈnit͡sa] (German: Gipp) is a settlement in the administrative district of Gmina Manowo, within Koszalin County, West Pomeranian Voivodeship, in north-western Poland.

For the history of the region, see History of Pomerania.
