= Gmina Wysoka =

Gmina Wysoka Wysoka Commune
- Gmina
- Coat of arms
- Interactive map of Gmina Wysoka
- Coordinates (Wysoka): 53°10′N 17°6′E
- Country: Poland
- Voivodeship: Greater Poland
- County: Piła
- Seat: Wysoka

Area
  - Total: 123.04 km^{2} (47.51 sq mi)

Population (2006)
  - Total: 6,890
  - Density: 56.0/km^{2} (145/sq mi)
  - Urban: 2,750
  - Rural: 4,140
- Website: http://www.gminawysoka.pl/

Gmina Wysoka is an urban-rural gmina (administrative district) in Piła County, Greater Poland Voivodeship, in west-central Poland. Its seat is the town of Wysoka, which lies approximately 25 kilometres (16 mi) east of Piła and 86 km (53 mi) north of the regional capital Poznań.

The gmina covers an area of 123.04 square kilometres (47.5 sq mi), and as of 2006 its total population is 6,890 (out of which the population of Wysoka amounts to 2,750, and the population of the rural part of the gmina is 4,140). It is situated in the historical region of Krajna.

== Villages ==
Apart from the town of Wysoka, Gmina Wysoka contains the villages and settlements of Bądecz, Czajcze, Gmurowo, Jeziorki Kosztowskie, Kijaszkowo, Kostrzynek, Młotkowo, Mościska, Nowa Rudna, Rudna, Sędziniec, Stare, Tłukomy, Wysoczka, Wysoka Mała and Wysoka Wielka.

== Neighbouring gminas ==
Gmina Wysoka is bordered by the gminas of Białośliwie, Kaczory, Krajenka, Łobżenica, Miasteczko Krajeńskie, Wyrzysk and Złotów.
