= Komorniki, West Pomeranian Voivodeship =

Komorniki
- Settlement
- Location within Poland
- Coordinates: 54°14′3″N 16°1′44″E
- Country: Poland
- Voivodeship: West Pomeranian
- County: Koszalin
- Gmina: Mielno

Komorniki [kɔmɔrˈniki] (German: Feldkathen) is a settlement in the administrative district of Gmina Mielno, within Koszalin County, West Pomeranian Voivodeship, in north-western Poland.

Before 1637 the area was part of Duchy of Pomerania. For the history of the region, see History of Pomerania.
