= Łazy, Koszalin County =

Łazy
- Village
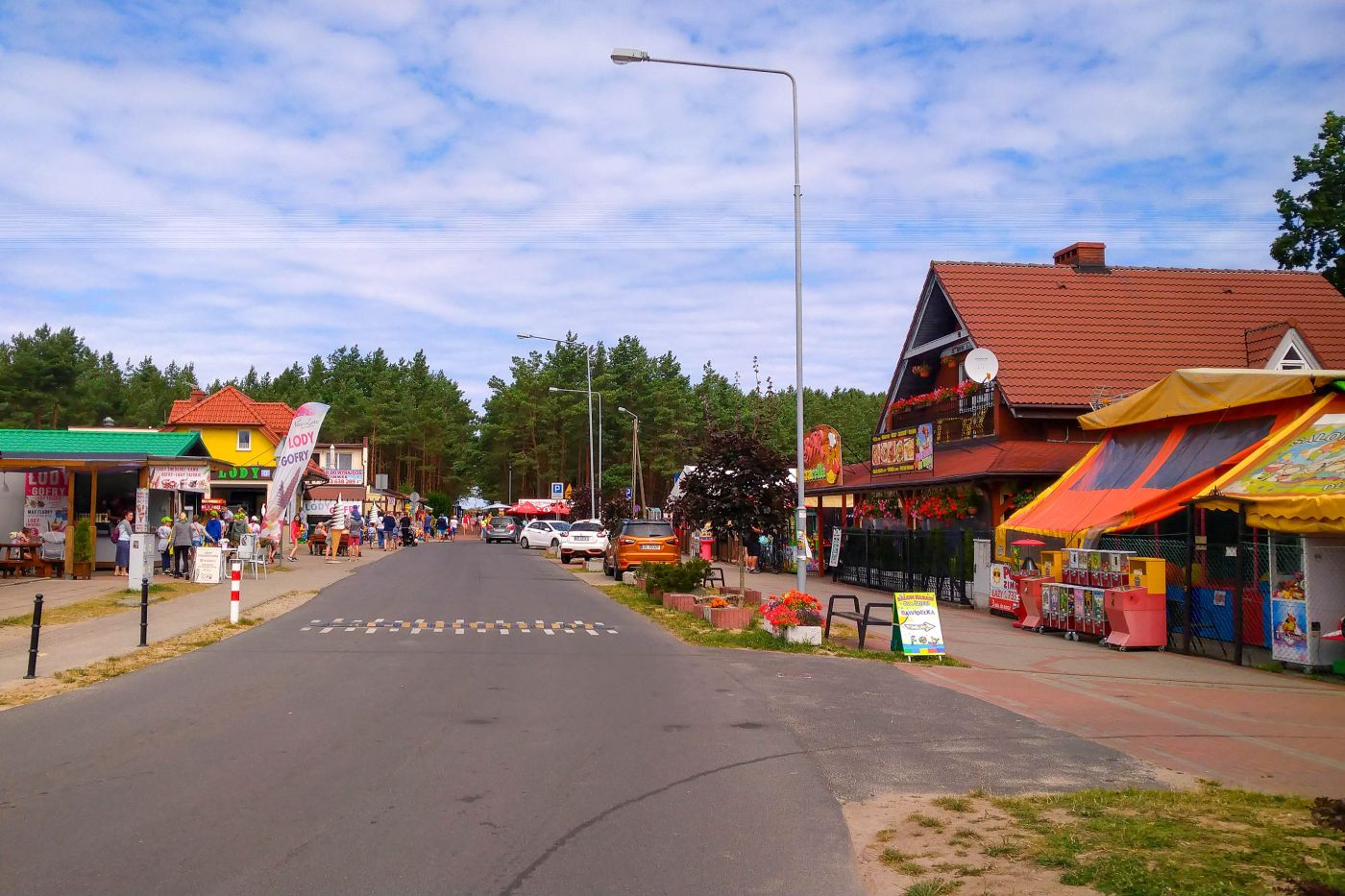
- Center of the village

- Location within Poland
- Coordinates: 54°18′36″N 16°12′11″E
- Country: Poland
- Voivodeship: West Pomeranian
- County: Koszalin
- Gmina: Mielno

Population
  - Total: 86

Łazy [ˈwazɨ] (German Laase) is a village in the administrative district of Gmina Mielno, within Koszalin County, West Pomeranian Voivodeship, in north-western Poland. It lies approximately 15 km (9 mi) north of Koszalin and 146 km (91 mi) north-east of the regional capital Szczecin.

Before 1637 the area was part of Duchy of Pomerania. For the history of the region, see History of Pomerania.

The village has a population of 86.
