= Nowa Rudna =

- Village
- Location within Poland
- Coordinates: 53°11′27″N 17°2′12″E
- Country: Poland
- Voivodeship: Greater Poland
- County: Piła
- Gmina: Wysoka

Nowa Rudna [ˈnɔva ˈrudna] is a village in the administrative district of Gmina Wysoka, within Piła County, Greater Poland Voivodeship, in west-central Poland.
