= Wiewiórowo =

- Village
- Location within Poland
- Coordinates: 54°7′44″N 16°23′42″E
- Country: Poland
- Voivodeship: West Pomeranian
- County: Koszalin
- Gmina: Manowo
- Population: 40

Wiewiórowo [vjɛvjuˈrɔvɔ] (formerly German Viverow) is a village in the administrative district of Gmina Manowo, within Koszalin County, West Pomeranian Voivodeship, in north-western Poland. It lies approximately 7 km (4 mi) east of Manowo, 16 km (10 mi) south-east of Koszalin, and 144 km (89 mi) north-east of the regional capital Szczecin.

For the history of the region, see History of Pomerania.

The village has a population of 40.
