= Paprotno, Koszalin County =

Paprotno
- Settlement
- Location within Poland
- Coordinates: 54°14′11″N 15°52′23″E
- Country: Poland
- Voivodeship: West Pomeranian
- County: Koszalin
- Gmina: Mielno

Paprotno [paˈprɔtnɔ] (German: Parpart) is a settlement in the administrative district of Gmina Mielno, within Koszalin County, West Pomeranian Voivodeship, in north-western Poland.
