= Chłopy =

- Village
- Location within Poland
- Coordinates: 54°15′7″N 15°59′10″E
- Country: Poland
- Voivodeship: (West Pomeranian Voivodeship) West Pomeranian
- County: Koszalin
- Gmina: Mielno
- Population: 223

Chłopy [ˈxwɔpɨ] (German: Bauerhufen) is a village in the administrative district of Gmina Mielno, within Koszalin County, West Pomeranian Voivodeship, in north-western Poland. It lies approximately 15 km (9 mi) north-west of Koszalin and 131 km (81 mi) north-east of the regional capital Szczecin.

Before 1637 the area was part of Duchy of Pomerania. For the history of the region, see History of Pomerania.

The village has a population of 223.
