= Lisowo, Koszalin County =

Lisowo
- Settlement
- Location within Poland
- Coordinates: 54°04′12″N 16°15′56″E
- Country: Poland
- Voivodeship: West Pomeranian
- County: Koszalin
- Gmina: Manowo

Lisowo [liˈsɔvɔ] (formerly German: Feldkaten) is a settlement in the administrative district of Gmina Manowo, within Koszalin County, West Pomeranian Voivodeship, in north-western Poland.

For the history of the region, see History of Pomerania.
