= Grąpa =

- Settlement
- Location within Poland
- Coordinates: 54°02′38″N 16°22′02″E
- Country: Poland
- Voivodeship: West Pomeranian
- County: Koszalin
- Gmina: Manowo

Grąpa [ˈɡrɔmpa] (German: Grumpe) is a settlement in the administrative district of Gmina Manowo, within Koszalin County, West Pomeranian Voivodeship, in north-western Poland.
