= Wysoczka, Piła County =

Wysoczka
- Village
- Location within Poland
- Coordinates: 53°11′N 17°6′E
- Country: Poland
- Voivodeship: Greater Poland
- County: Piła
- Gmina: Wysoka

Wysoczka [vɨˈsɔt͡ʂka] is a village in the administrative district of Gmina Wysoka, within Piła County, Greater Poland Voivodeship, in west-central Poland.
