= Zacisze, Koszalin County =

Zacisze
- Settlement
- Location within Poland
- Coordinates: 54°05′21″N 16°19′53″E
- Country: Poland
- Voivodeship: West Pomeranian
- County: Koszalin
- Gmina: Manowo

Zacisze [zaˈt͡ɕiʂɛ] (German: Grünhof) is a settlement in the administrative district of Gmina Manowo, within Koszalin County, West Pomeranian Voivodeship, in north-western Poland.

For the history of the region, see History of Pomerania.
