= Unieście =

- Village
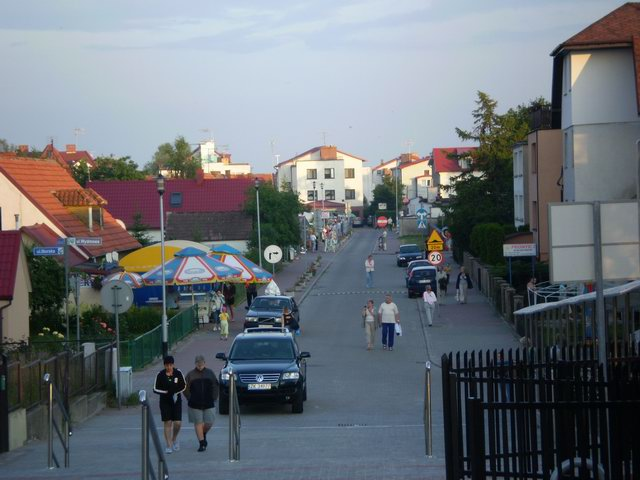
- A street close to the beach

- Location within Poland
- Coordinates: 54°16′4″N 16°5′12″E
- Country: Poland
- Voivodeship: West Pomeranian
- County: Koszalin
- Gmina: Mielno
- Elevation: 10 m (33 ft)

Population
  - Total: 1,000

Unieście [uˈɲɛɕt͡ɕɛ] (German: Nest) is a coastal village in the administrative district of Gmina Mielno, within Koszalin County, West Pomeranian Voivodeship, in north-western Poland. It lies approximately 12 km (7 mi) north-west of Koszalin and 137 km (85 mi) north-east of the regional capital Szczecin.

Before 1637 the area was part of Duchy of Pomerania. For the history of the region, see History of Pomerania.

Unieście has a population of 1,000. Together with Mielno, which it adjoins to the west, it serves as a popular seaside resort. The two villages lie on a spit between the Baltic Sea and Jamno lake.
