= Mielenko-Kolonia =

- Village
- Location within Poland
- Coordinates: 54°14′2″N 16°1′31″E
- Country: Poland
- Voivodeship: West Pomeranian
- County: Koszalin
- Gmina: Mielno

Mielenko-Kolonia [mjɛˈlɛnkɔ kɔˈlɔɲa] (German: Klein Möllen-Cölln) is a village in the administrative district of Gmina Mielno, within Koszalin County, West Pomeranian Voivodeship, in north-western Poland. It lies approximately 12 km (7 mi) north-west of Koszalin and 132 km (82 mi) north-east of the regional capital Szczecin.

Before 1637 the area was part of Duchy of pomerania. For the history of the region, see History of Pomerania.
