= Mielenko, West Pomeranian Voivodeship =

Mielenko
- Village
- Location within Poland
- Coordinates: 54°14′58″N 16°0′56″E
- Country: Poland
- Voivodeship: West Pomeranian
- County: Koszalin
- Gmina: Mielno
- Population: 183

Mielenko [mjɛˈlɛnkɔ] (German: Klein Möllen) is a village in the administrative district of Gmina Mielno, within Koszalin County, West Pomeranian Voivodeship, in north-western Poland. It lies approximately 14 km (9 mi) north-west of Koszalin and 132 km (82 mi) north-east of the regional capital Szczecin.

Before 1637 the area was part of Duchy of Pomerania. For the history of the region, see History of Pomerania.

The village has a population of 183.
