= Czajcze, West Pomeranian Voivodeship =

Czajcze
- Settlement
- Location within Poland
- Coordinates: 54°17′34″N 16°9′47″E
- Country: Poland
- Voivodeship: West Pomeranian
- County: Koszalin
- Gmina: Mielno

Czajcze [ˈt͡ʂai̯t͡ʂɛ] (German: Deep) is a settlement in the administrative district of Gmina Mielno, within Koszalin County, West Pomeranian Voivodeship, in north-western Poland. It lies approximately 13 km (8 mi) north of Koszalin and 143 km (89 mi) north-east of the regional capital Szczecin.

Before 1637 the area was part of Duchy of Pomerania. For the history of the region, see History of Pomerania.
