= Barnowo, West Pomeranian Voivodeship =

Barnowo
- Settlement
- Location within Poland
- Coordinates: 54°15′12″N 16°03′52″E
- Country: Poland
- Voivodeship: West Pomeranian
- County: Koszalin
- Gmina: Mielno

Barnowo [barˈnɔvɔ] (German: Bannow) is a settlement in the administrative district of Gmina Mielno, within Koszalin County, West Pomeranian Voivodeship, in north-western Poland.
