= Wysoka =

Town in Greater Poland Voivodeship, Poland

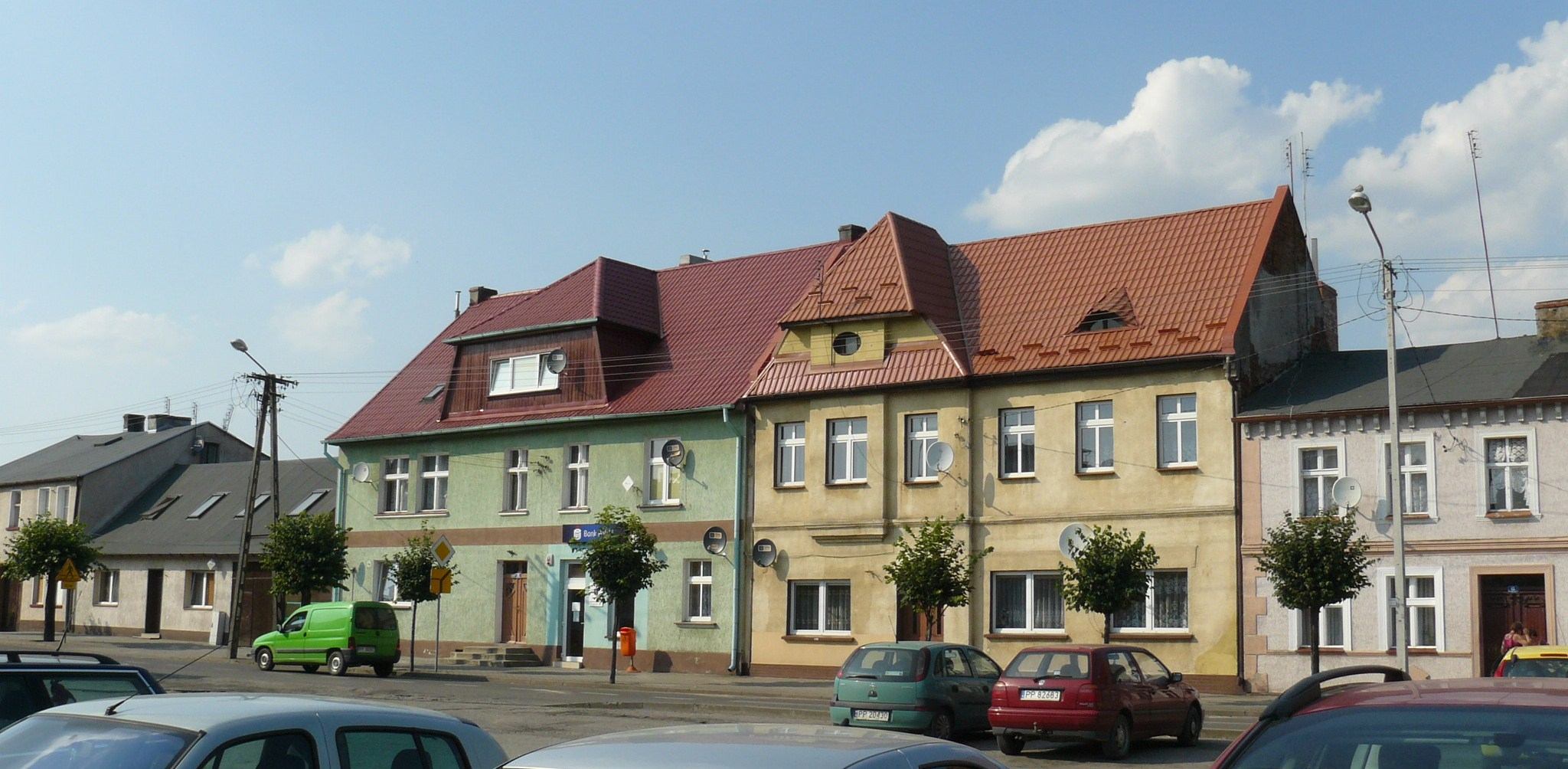
- Town centre

- Coat of arms

- Location within Poland
- Coordinates: 53°10′N 17°6′E
- Country: Poland
- Voivodeship: Greater Poland
- County: Piła
- Gmina: Wysoka
- First mentioned: 1260
- Town rights: 1505

Government
  - Mayor: Artur Kłysz

Area
  - Total: 4.82 km^{2} (1.86 sq mi)
- Elevation: 110 m (360 ft)

Population (2010)
  - Total: 2,736
  - Density: 568/km^{2} (1,470/sq mi)
- Time zone: UTC+1 (CET)
  - Summer (DST): UTC+2 (CEST)
- Postal code: 89-320
- Area code: +48 67
- Vehicle registration: PP
- Website: http://gminawysoka.pl

Wysoka ([vɨˈsɔka]; German: Wissek) is a town in Piła County, Greater Poland Voivodeship, Poland, with 2,736 inhabitants (2010).

== History ==
=== Early history ===
The oldest known mention Wysoka comes from 1260, when it was granted by Duke Bolesław the Pious from the Piast dynasty to Mikołaj Łodzia. Its name means "high" in Polish and refers to its elevation, as it is located at the Wysockie Hills. In the 15th century, there was already a Catholic church of St. Martin in the village. Wysoka was granted town rights in 1505. Also the town's coat of arms dates back to the 16th century. In the following centuries it was a private town owned by Polish nobility, particularly the Kościelski and Tuczyński families, located in the Kalisz Voivodeship in the Greater Poland Province of the Kingdom of Poland. In the late 17th century local noblewoman Apolonia Tuczyńska brought Augustinians to Wysoka. She later renewed Wysoka's town rights after a big fire in 1722, while in 1727–1729 the Augustinians built a Baroque Church of Our Lady of the Rosary.

During the First Partition of Poland, in 1772, Wysoka was annexed by Prussia. After the successful Greater Poland uprising of 1806, it was regained by Poles and included within the short-lived Duchy of Warsaw. It was re-annexed by Prussia in 1815. After 1818, under the Germanized name Wissek, it belonged to the Wirsitz county of the province of Posen. In 1846 the town suffered a fire.

=== 20th century ===
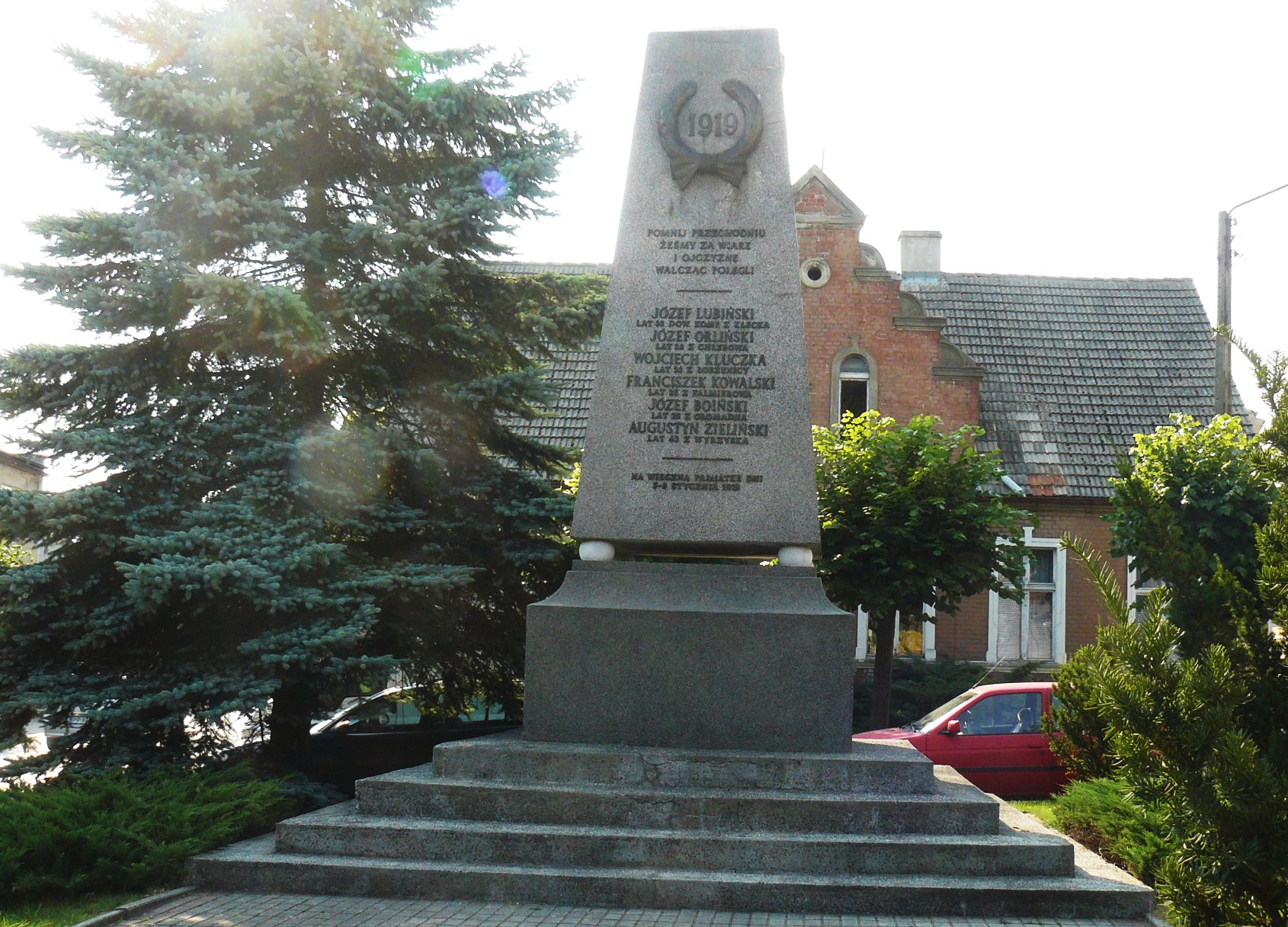
Memorial to fallen insurgents of the Greater Poland uprising

In January 1919 Wysoka was captured by Poles during Greater Poland uprising (1918–19), which aim was to reintegrate the town along with the region of Greater Poland with Poland, which just regained independence a few weeks earlier. Poles established the Polish People's Council (Polska Rada Ludowa) and the Civic Guard (Straż Obywatelska). However, later that same month, irregulars from Germany captured the town. A Polish counterattack from Wyrzysk failed. In 1919 a local branch of the "Sokół" Polish Gymnastic Society was founded. In January 1920 Wysoka was finally transferred from Weimar Germany to Poland following the Treaty of Versailles, and it was attached to the Wyrzysk Powiat (county).

After the German invasion of Poland, which sparked World War II in September 1939, 19 Polish craftsmen and farmers were murdered by the Germans on the slope of the Góra Wysoka hill in two mass executions on October 21 and November 21. Nowadays there is a memorial at the site. Local Poles were also murdered by the Germans in other places, for instance, the principal of the interwar Polish school, Franciszek Karowski, was murdered in Paterek in October 1939. The local Polish police chief was murdered by the Russians in the Katyn massacre in 1940. The town was annexed into the "Regierungsbezirk Bromberg" of the Reichsgau Danzig-West Prussia and governed by the Nazi Gauleiter Albert Forster. During the occupation of Poland the administration changed the name of the town to "Weißeck" (1942–1945).

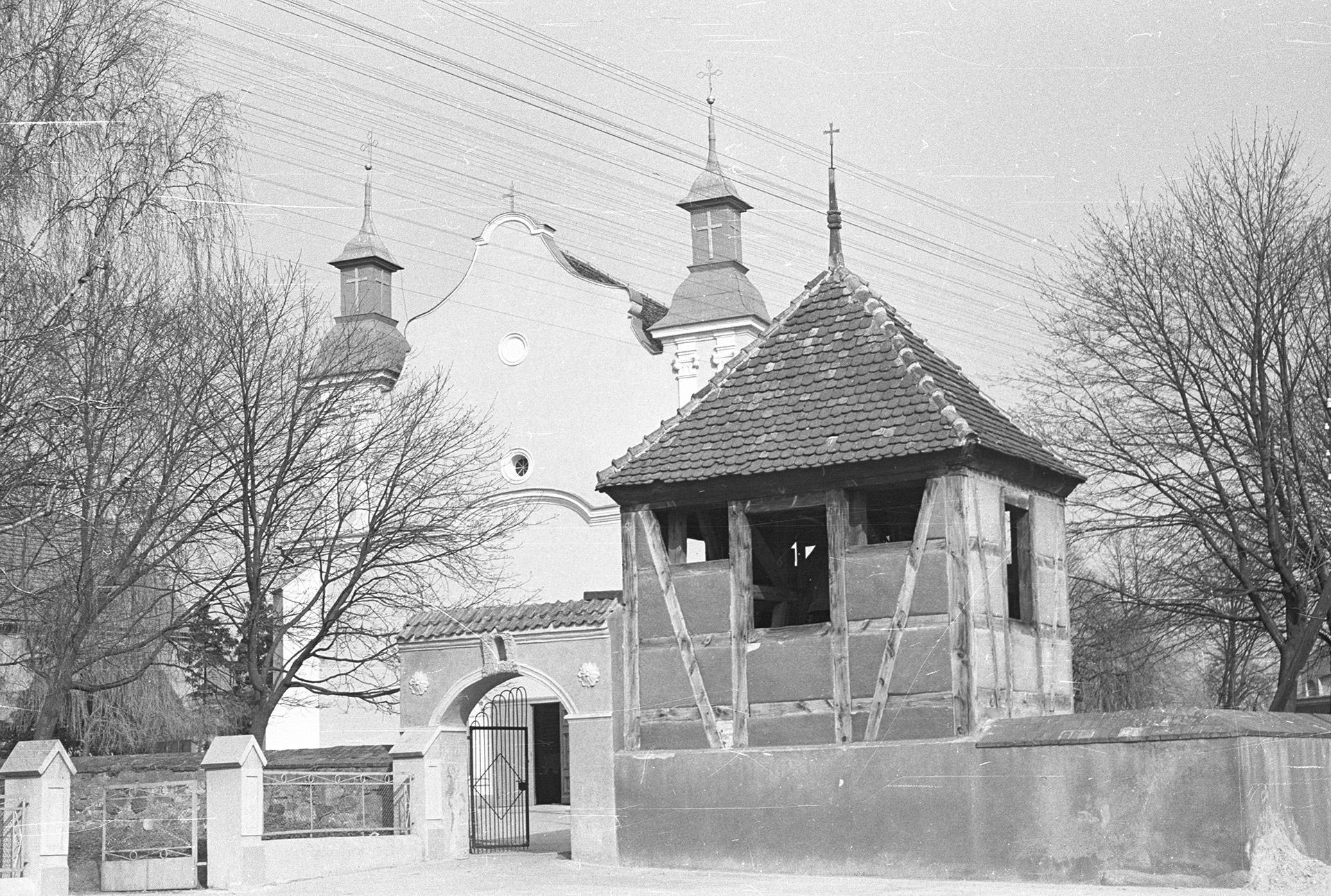
Baroque Church of Our Lady of the Rosary and the timber framed belfry in the 1970s

The German occupation ended in January 1945 and the town was restored to Poland, although with a Soviet-installed communist regime, which stayed in power until the Fall of Communism in the 1980s. In the following years, the Polish anti-communist resistance was active in the town and its environs, including the Home Army, and several local organizations.

Between 1975 and 1998 the city administratively belonged to the Piła Voivodeship. Since 1999 the town has been part of the Greater Poland Voivodeship.

== Demographics ==
Historical population

Year	Pop.	±%
1850	1,055	—
1880	1,161	+10.0%
1890	1,071	−7.8%
1900	1,167	+9.0%
1910	1,501	+28.6%
1921	1,328	−11.5%

Year	Pop.	±%
1931	1,463	+10.2%
1939	1,509	+3.1%
1950	1,419	−6.0%
1960	1,624	+14.4%
2010	2,736	+68.5%

== Economy ==
Wysoka is a small business centre, which serves the needs of the surrounding agricultural area. There is a small wood and brick factory. There was much economic development during the 19th century when the Prussian province of Posen was fully integrated into the wider Imperial German economy. Many Germans left after World War I and those who remained were expelled after World War II. A small gauge rail still serves the area.

== Sports ==
Wysoka's football team is GLKS Wysoka, founded in 1949, and it competes in the regional lower leagues.

== Sights ==
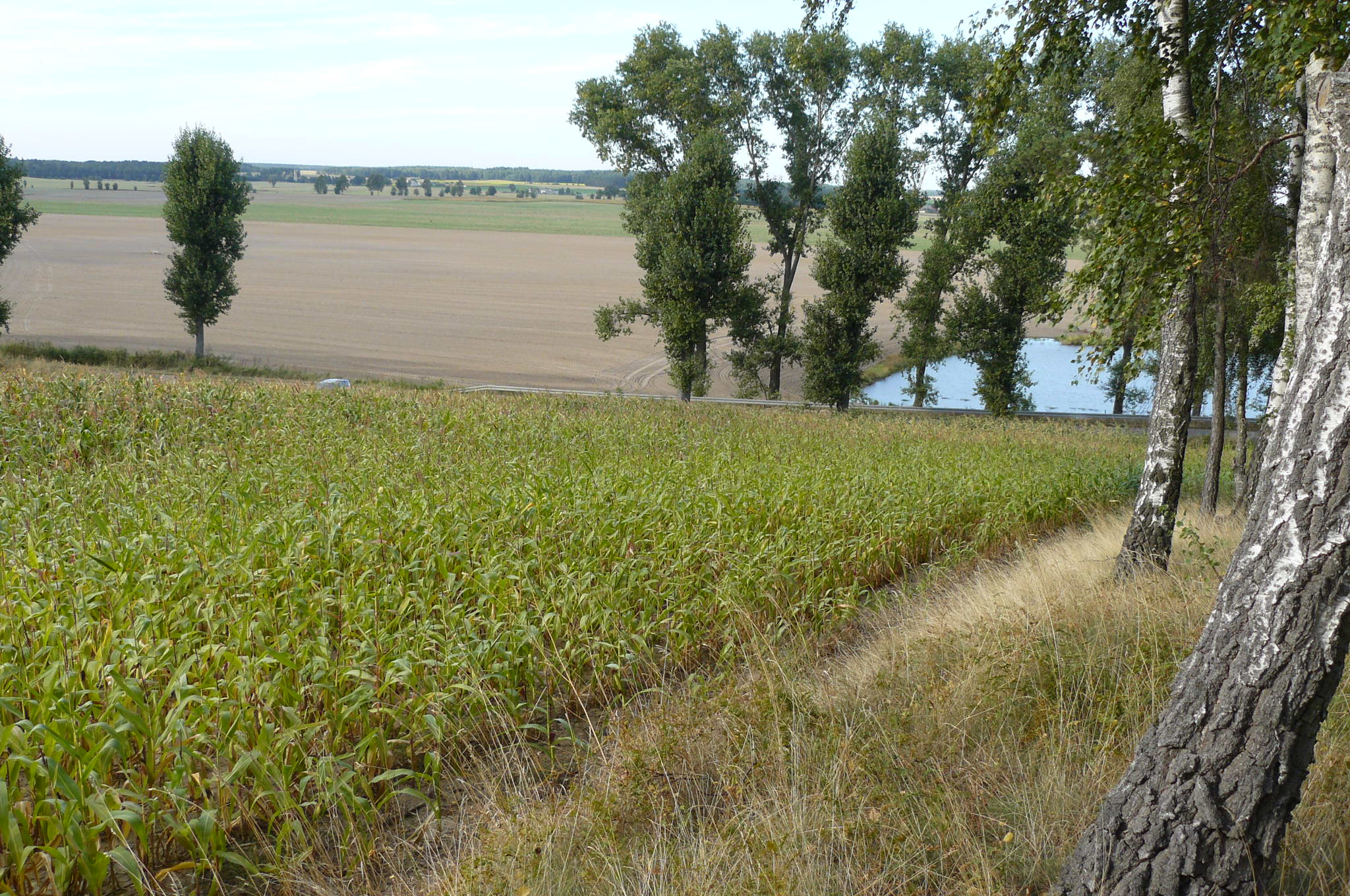
Góry Wysockie (Wysockie Hills)

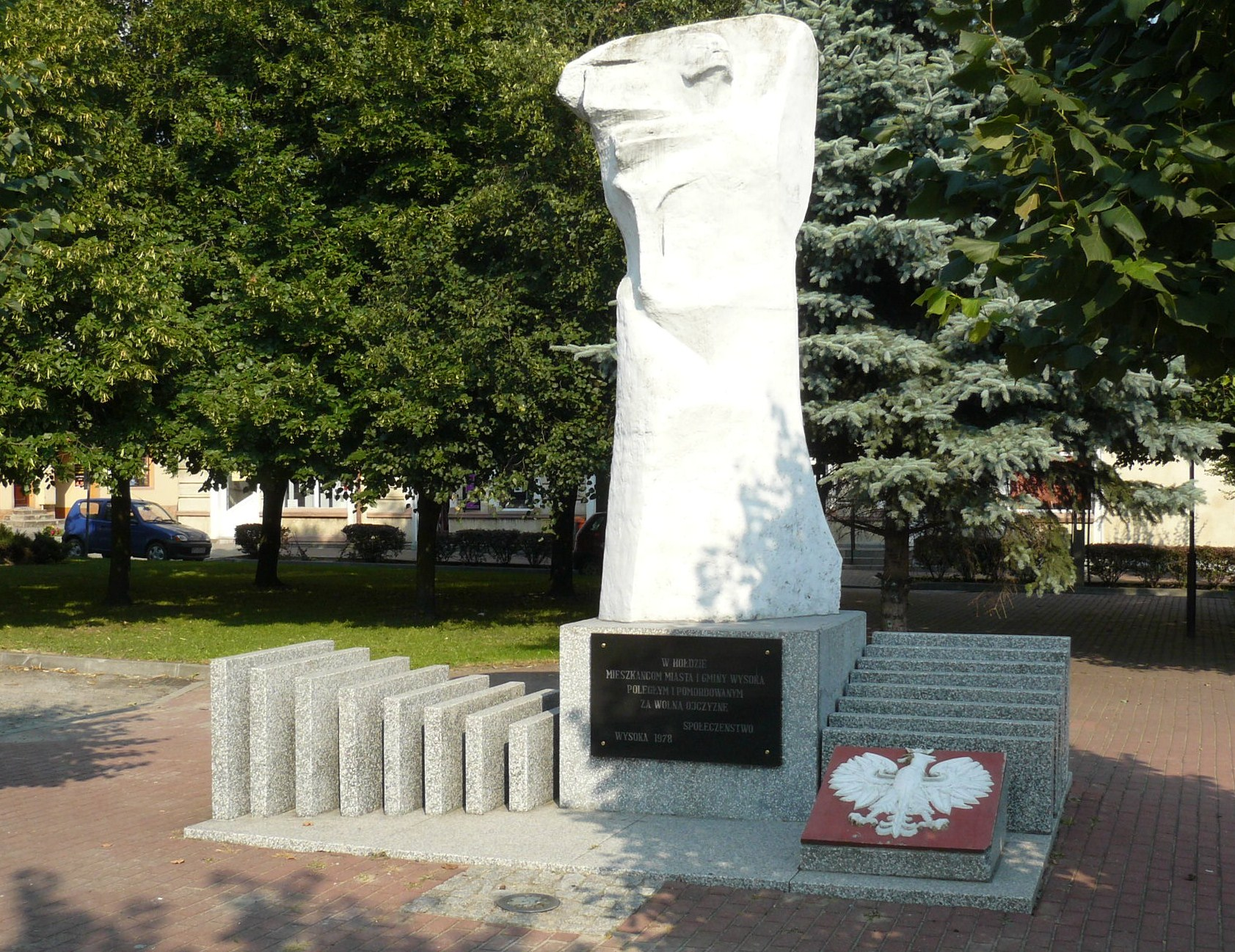
A monument commemorating the fallen and murdered Poles of the town and gmina Wysoka

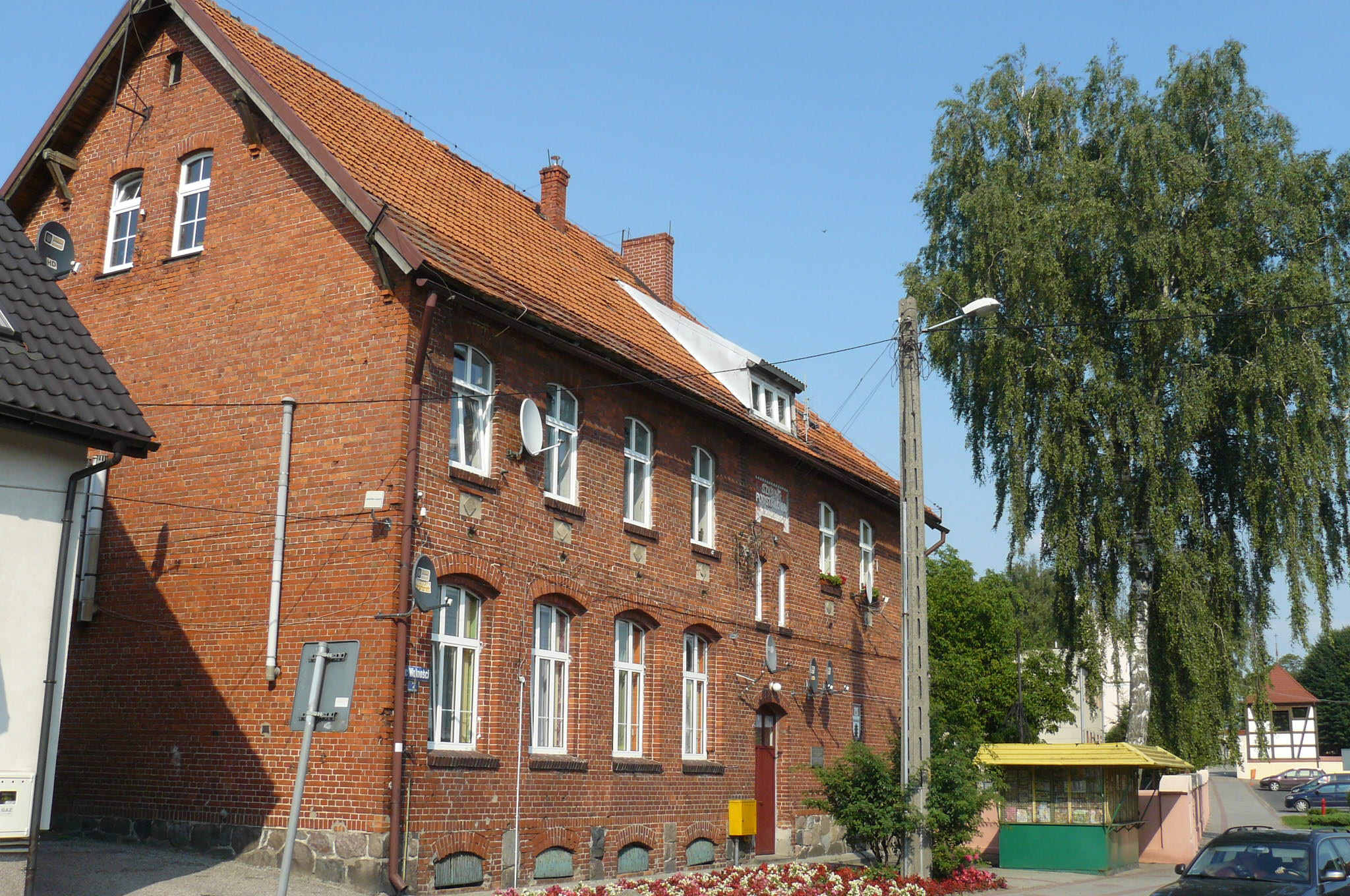
Old school building

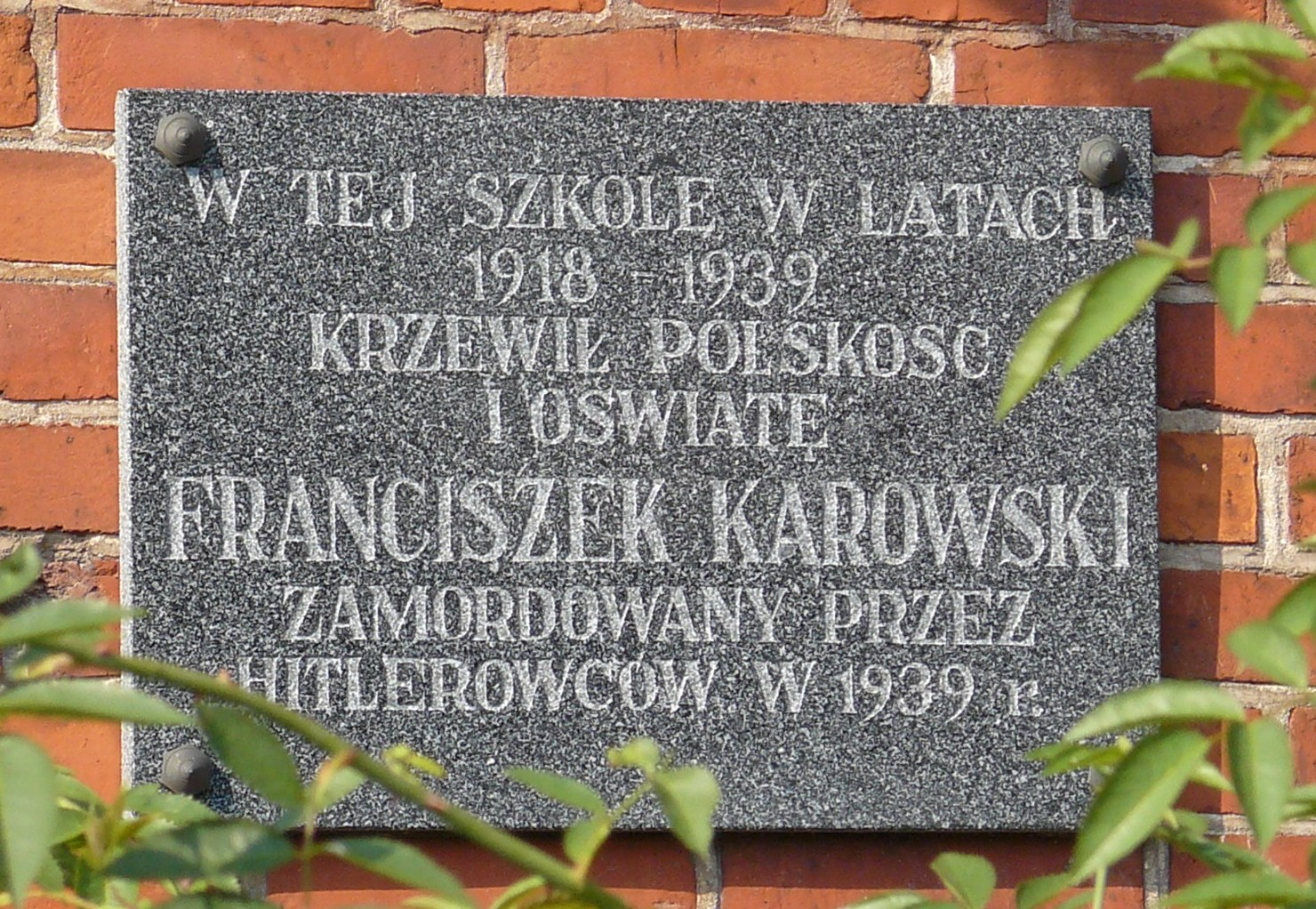
Memorial plaque to the interwar Polish school principal Franciszek Karowski, murdered by the Germans in 1939, at the old school building

== Notable residents ==
- Antoni Bederski (1848–1930), Polish philologist, librarian, editor, director of the Raczyński Library in Poznań
- Lewin Louis Aronsohn (1850–1928), German banker and liberal politician
- Karl-Gustav Sauberzweig (1899–1946), German army officer
- Marek Ziarnik (1955–1997), Polish speedway rider
- Krzysztof Ziarnik (born 1965), Polish former speedway rider
