= Gmina Manowo =

Gmina Manowo Manowo Commune
- Gmina
- Coat of arms
- Interactive map of Gmina Manowo
- Coordinates (Manowo): 54°7′30″N 16°18′6″E
- Country: Poland
- Voivodeship: West Pomeranian
- County: Koszalin County
- Seat: Manowo

Area
  - Total: 188.57 km^{2} (72.81 sq mi)

Population (2006)
  - Total: 6,322
  - Density: 33.53/km^{2} (86.83/sq mi)
- Website: http://www.manowo.pl/

Gmina Manowo is a rural gmina (administrative district) in Koszalin County, West Pomeranian Voivodeship, in north-western Poland. Its seat is the village of Manowo, which lies approximately 11 kilometres (7 mi) south-east of Koszalin and 138 km (86 mi) north-east of the regional capital Szczecin.

The gmina covers an area of 188.57 square kilometres (72.8 mi^{2}), and as of 2006 its total population is 6,322.

== Villages ==
Gmina Manowo contains the villages and settlements of Bonin, Cewlino, Dęborogi, Gajewo, Grąpa, Grzybnica, Grzybniczka, Jagielno, Kliszno, Kopanica, Kopanino, Kostrzewa, Kretomino, Lisowo, Manowo, Mostowo, Policko, Poniki, Rosnowo, Wiewiórowo, Wyszebórz, Wyszewo and Zacisze.

== Neighbouring gminas ==
Gmina Manowo is bordered by the city of Koszalin and by the gminas of Bobolice, Polanów, Sianów and Świeszyno.
