= Jamno (lake) =

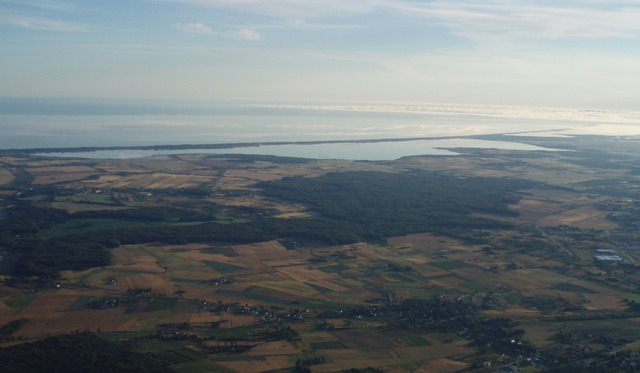
- Aerial view showing Jamno lake and the spit which divides it from the Baltic Sea

- Location within West Pomeranian Voivodeship
- Location: northern coast of Poland
- Coordinates: 54.2733°N 16.1506°E
- Type: natural brackish lake.
- Basin countries: Poland
- Max. length: 10.1 kilometres (6.3 mi)
- Max. width: 3.4 kilometres (2.1 mi)
- Surface area: 22 km^{2} (8.5 mi^{2})
- Max. depth: 3.9 metres (13 ft)
- Surface elevation: 0 m (0 ft)

Jamno (/ˈjæmnoʊ/ YAM-noh; German: Jamunder See) is a lake in West Pomeranian Voivodeship, Poland. It is divided from the Baltic Sea by a spit, on which lie the resorts of Mielno and Unieście.

Jamno covers an area of over 22 square kilometres (8.5 sq mi); its maximum length is 10.1 kilometres (6.3 mi) and its maximum breadth is 3.4 kilometres (2.1 mi). Its greatest depth is 3.9 metres (13 ft). The lake is popularly used for sailing.

An examination of this lake from 2007 shows it is a brackish coastal lagoon that at that time was heavily polluted by sewage from the nearby city of Koszalin.
