= Manowo =

- Village
- Location within Poland
- Coordinates: 54°8′N 16°17′E
- Country: Poland
- Voivodeship: West Pomeranian
- County: Koszalin
- Gmina: Manowo
- Population: 760

Manowo [maˈnɔvɔ] (German: Manow) is a village in Koszalin County, West Pomeranian Voivodeship, in north-western Poland. It is the seat of the gmina (administrative district) called Gmina Manowo. It lies approximately 9 km (6 mi) south-east of Koszalin and 138 km (86 mi) north-east of the regional capital Szczecin.

It has the only Dino in Gmina Manowo and the only non-local shop in Gmina Manowo, other than the Stokrotka in Rosnowo.

For the history of the region, see History of Pomerania.

The village is home to a population of 760 residents.
