= Buchholz (surname) =

Buchholz, also spelt Bucholz and Buchholtz, is a German surname.

== Surname ==
Notable people with the surname include:

- Barbara Buchholz (1959–2012), German musician and composer
- Bernd Klaus Buchholz (born 1961), German politician and lawyer
- Bob Buchholz (born 1957), American voice actor in anime films
- Butch Buchholz (born 1940), American former tennis player
- Carl August Buchholz (1796–1884), German organ builder
- Christian Friedrich Bucholz (1770–1818), German pharmaceutical chemist
- Christine Buchholz (born 1971), German politician, and Die Linke (The Left) member of the Bundestag
- Clay Buchholz (born 1984), American baseball pitcher
- Cliff Buchholz (born 1943), American tennis player
- Daniel Buchholz, German art dealer
- Detlev Buchholz (born 1944), German theoretical physicist
- Emily A. Buchholtz, American paleontologist
- Erich Buchholz (1891–1972), German painter
- Francis Buchholz (1954–2026), German rock n' roll bass player
- Fryderyk Buchholtz (1792–1837), German organ builder
- Fyodor Buchholz (1857–1942), Russian-Soviet painter
- Gerhard T. Buchholz (1898–1970), German screenwriter, director and producer
- Hans-Ulrich Buchholz (1944–2011), German rower
- Helen Buchholtz (1877–1953), Luxembourgian composer
- Horst Buchholz (1933–2003), German actor
- Janina Buchholtz-Bukolska (1893–1969), Polish psychologist and translator
- John Buchholz (born 1979), American rugby union player
- Johann Simon Buchholz (1758–1825), German organ builder
- John Theodore Buchholz (1888–1951), American botanist
- Justin Buchholz (born 1983), American MMA artist
- Karl Buchholz (1849–1889), German painter
- Karl Buchholz (1901–1992), German art dealer
- Kurt Bucholz (1950–2006), American politician
- Ludwig Heinrich Buchholtz (1740–1811), Prussian diplomat
- Mary Bucholtz (born 1966), American linguist
- Matthias Buchholz (born 1957), German violist
- Max Bucholz (1912–1996), German pilot and flying ace of World War II
- Max Buchholz (1875–1956) (in German), engineer (who invented the Buchholz relay)
- Merritt Bucholz (born 1966), American architect
- Nikolay Buchholtz (1881–1943), Russian scientist
- Oda Buchholz (1940–2014), German linguist
- Peter Buchholz (1837–1892), German rabbi
- Peter Buchholz (born 1941), South African philologist
- Quint Buchholz (born 1957), German painter, illustrator and author
- Reinhold Wilhelm Buchholz (1837–1876), German zoologist
- Rob Bucholz (born 1961), Canadian curler
- Robert Buchholz (1954–1994), American singer, pianist and composer
- Sabrina Buchholz (born 1980), German biathlete
- Scott Buchholz (born 1968), Australian politician
- Taylor Buchholz (born 1981), American baseball player
- Thomas Buchholz (born 1961), German composer and music educator
- Todd G. Buchholz (born 1961), American economic policy commentator
- Werner Buchholz (born 1948), German historian
- Werner Buchholz (1922–2019), American computer scientist who coined the term "byte"
- Werner Buchholz (born 1948), German historian
- Wilhelm Heinrich Sebastian Bucholz (1734–1798), German chemist and pharmacist
- Garth Von Buchholz, Canadian author
