= Peter Buchholz =

Peter Buchholz may refer to:

- Peter Buchholz (philologist) (born 1941), South African philologist
- Peter Buchholz (rabbi) (1837–1892), German rabbi
