= Kościerza =

- Settlement
- Location within Poland
- Coordinates: 54°9′16″N 16°26′00″E
- Country: Poland
- Voivodeship: West Pomeranian
- County: Koszalin
- Gmina: Sianów

Kościerza [kɔɕˈt͡ɕɛʐa] is a settlement in the administrative district of Gmina Sianów, within Koszalin County, West Pomeranian Voivodeship, in north-western Poland. It lies approximately 12 km (7 mi) south-east of Sianów, 16 km (10 mi) east of Koszalin, and 146 km (91 mi) north-east of the regional capital Szczecin.

Until 1653, the village was part of Duchy of Pomerania. It was part of Brandenburg, then Germany, until the end of World War II. For the post-war history of the region, see History of Pomerania.
