= Bielkowo, Koszalin County =

Bielkowo
- Village
- Location within Poland
- Coordinates: 54°18′51″N 16°18′16″E
- Country: Poland
- Voivodeship: West Pomeranian
- County: Koszalin
- Gmina: Sianów
- Population: 269
- Website: http://www.bielkowo.eu

Bielkowo [bjɛlˈkɔvɔ] (German Beelkow) is a village in the administrative district of Gmina Sianów, within Koszalin County, West Pomeranian Voivodeship, in north-western Poland. It lies approximately 10 km (6 mi) north of Sianów, 17 km (11 mi) north-east of Koszalin, and 151 km (94 mi) north-east of the regional capital Szczecin.

Until 1653, the village was part of Duchy of Pomerania. It was part of Brandenburg, then Germany, until the end of World War II. For the post-war history of the region, see History of Pomerania.

The village has a population of 269.
