= Heribert von Larisch =

Historical German general

- Born: 18 July 1894; Freiburg im Breisgau, German Empire
- Died: 16 May 1972 (aged 77); Hamburg, West Germany
- Military career
- Allegiance: German Empire; Weimar Republic; Nazi Germany (1933–1945)
- Branch: Reichsheer; German Army (Wehrmacht)
- Service years: 1914–1920; 1929–1945
- Rank: Generalleutnant
- Commands: 78th Infantry Division; 129th Infantry Division
- Conflicts: World War I World War II
- Awards: Knight's Cross of the Iron Cross
- Other work: Author, landowner

Heribert von Larisch (18 July 1894 – 16 May 1972) was a German general during World War II. He was a recipient of the Knight's Cross of the Iron Cross.

Born into an aristocratic family, Larisch served during World War I as a troop officer during the war and was discharged from the army in 1920. He spent several years as landowner in Pomerania, and was re-employed by the Landesschutz, an unofficial branch of the army. He became an active officer again in 1933. During the early years of World War II he commanded units on inactive fronts or in occupational duties. From 1943 on he served as a field commander at the Eastern Front. After the war, he lived in Hamburg, West Germany until his death in 1972.

== Early years and World War I ==
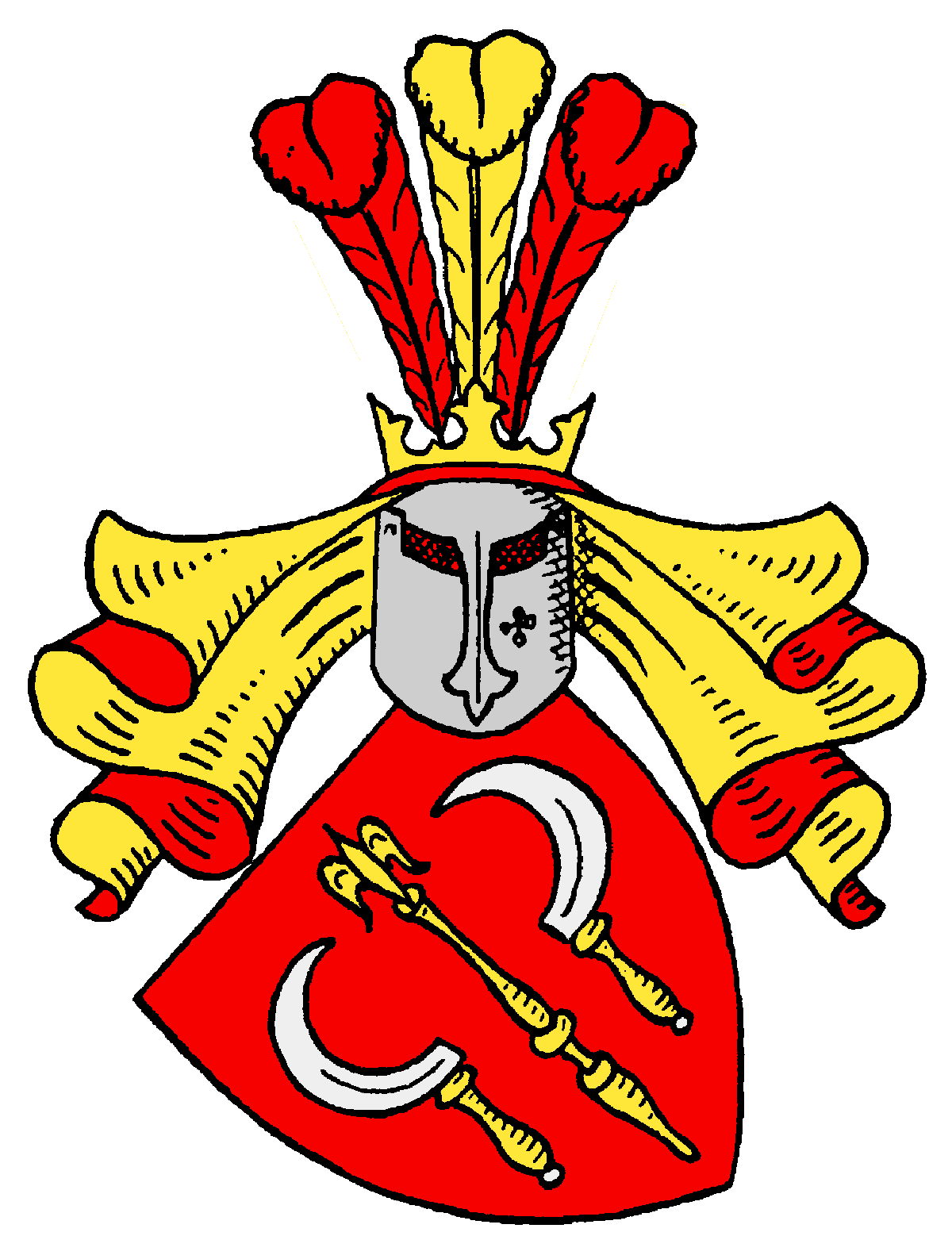
Coat of arms of the Larisch family

Larisch was born in 1894 in Freiburg im Breisgau as the first son of a military officer. Both of his parents were members of the German nobility. After successfully completing his high school studies (Abitur), 19-year-old Larisch joined the army. Thanks to his noble birth and being from a military family, in February 1914, Larisch was accepted into the Prussian Army.

Shortly after the outbreak of World War I on 28 July 1914, Larisch was mobilized on 2 August 1914 and received a hastened commission to Leutnant in September of that year. He spent the majority of the war with the 18th Dragoon Regiment, serving as platoon and squadron commander. In January 1918 he was transferred to the 359th Infantry Regiment to assume the command of a company; in that position, he was promoted to Oberleutnant (1st Lieutenant) in May 1918. In August, he became Ordonnanzoffizier (Batman) at the staff of I Reserve Corps. He was still serving in that position when the German Empire capitulated on 11 November 1918.

== Interwar period ==
=== In the Weimar Republic ===
While still in the army service, Larisch enrolled in the University of Rostock in February 1920 in order to study law; however, he never completed his studies. Larisch wasn't selected for the downsized, 1,000-man officer corps of the Reichswehr and was discharged.

During the war, on 18 June 1917, he married Ellen Fanny Wanda Natalie Helene, née Edle von Xylander (1895–1974), the daughter of Adolf Ritter und Edler von Xylander, a nobleman and Oberstleutnant (Lieutenant Colonel). Larisch's mother-in-law, who had divorced Xylander in 1914 to marry the officer Eduard Ermekeil (31 October 1864 – 18 November 1941) in 1916, came from a family of Pomeranian landowners. Among others, they owned the estates of Latzig, as well as the nearby estates of Zirchow B and Alt–Zowen in the Pomeranian District of Schlawe (Kreis Schlawe). Ellen Ermekeil (Larisch's mother-in-law) became administrator of the estate of Zirchow B in 1921. After his discharge, Larisch settled at Zirchow, along with his wife and his daughter Irmgard (1918–1998).

Larisch occupied himself with the administration of the estate in Zirchow B. During the 1920s, he and his wife had four more children: Siegrid (born 1921), Friederun (born in 1922), Karin (born in 1924) and Dankwart (born in 1925). In addition, Larisch occupied himself with the history of his Regiment during the war. The result of his work, Das 2. Großherzogl. Mecklenburg. Dragoner-Reg. Nr 18 im Weltkriege 1914–1918 (The Grand Duchy of Mecklenburg 2nd Dragoner Regiment No. 18 in the World War 1914–1918), was published in 1924. In 1928, he took over the estate of Zirchow B.

=== National Socialism ===
Seeking to circumvent the Treaty of Versailles and enlarge the size of the army strength, the leadership of the new army (Reichswehr), worked from 1926 on the development of a secret army, formed on existing paramilitary border guard organizations, which received training and equipment unofficially. Those formations were part of the Landesschutzorganisation (Land Protection Organization, or LO), and their main duty was the border protection, the training of the LO troops, and to an extent the maintaining of the civilian order. Naturally, the Reichswehr wished to utilize veteran officers who were discharged from the Reichswehr in 1920, but, since officially the Reichswehr was limited to 1,000 active officers, the officers of the LO were classified as "civilian employees of the Reichswehr" on paper, and were commonly known as L–Offiziere (short for Landesschutzoffiziere, or Land Protection Officers). Larisch entered the Landesschutz on 1 July 1929, as an Oberleutnant (L). He was employed by the Wehrkreis (Military District) II (Mecklenburg and Pomerania, with HQ in Stettin), appointed as the District Administrator for the area of Schlochau and Bublitz, adjacent to the family estates.

Larisch spent the following years in that rather quiet position. On 1 February 1932 he was transferred to the Command Office in Neustettin (also in Pomerania), where he witnessed Adolf Hitler's rise to power one year later: on 31 January 1933, he became Chancellor of Germany. In the following years, disregarding the confining Versailles Treaty, the Nazi regime intensified the German re-armament (Aufrüstung) and the size of the military. On 1 October 1933, Larisch was transferred from the Landesschutzen officers to the active officers of the Reichswehr, and was simultaneously promoted to Hauptmann (Captain). Evidently, Larisch was earmarked for active troop command, given that he was still 42 years old, and was given a troop assignment, the command of a company in the 4th Infantry Regiment (4. Infanterie–Regiment), headquartered in Kolberg, Pomerania. He retained the same position as company commander when the regiment was restructured in the frame of the expansion of the Reichswehr — which was renamed to Wehrmacht in 1935 — from 1 October 1934 with a new designation, Infantry Regiment "Kolberg" (Infanterie–Regiment Kolberg). One year later, he was posted as instructor at the prestigious Infantry School in Döberitz (Infanterieschule Döberitz) near Berlin. He remained there until July 1936, when he was transferred to 94th Infantry Regiment (94. Infanterie–Regiment), which was then under formation in Pomerania, again as a company commander. Shortly thereafter he was promoted to Major and in early October 1937 he was transferred to another Infantry School, this time to Hanover in Lower Saxony, as Taktiklehrer (Tactics Instructor). He taught officer classes there for the two following years, until the outbreak of World War II on 1 September 1939.

== World War II ==
Germany invaded Poland on 1 September 1939, marking the start of World War II in Europe. The organization of new divisions escalated in the weeks leading up to the war, and experienced officers were needed to man the newly formed divisions. The 86th Infantry Division was formed in Detmold on 26 August and Larisch took over command of the 1st Battalion of its 167th Infantry Regiment. This unit didn't participate in the Polish Campaign, however, as more accommodated to tactical doctrines officers were chosen to lead from the front, in favour of officers who had resumed their service in the 1930s. The 86th Division occupied a sector of the inactive Western Front. Larisch spent a great part of the Phoney War there, from October 1939 to January 1940, again trusted with training duties, in light of his earlier experience. In this capacity, he oversaw the training of Company and Battalion leaders. It can be assumed that Larisch's superiors held his training skills in high regard, but still deemed him unfit for field service, as he was transferred away from the front and posted as a Tactics Instructor for Company commanders in the city of Königsbrück in Upper Lusatia on 10 January. Simultaneously, he was named commander of the 3rd Battalion of the 440th Infantry Regiment, which was being under formation in Königsbrück. In February, he was promoted to Oberstleutnant (Colonel). In May 1940, his tenure as instructor ended, and he occupied himself exclusively with the command of his battalion. The quality of the units' training in Königsbrück prompted the American military attaché to write to his superiors that he was "impressed" of the German tactics in the army manoeuvres there.

Larisch remained battalion commander throughout 1940 — his unit didn't participate in the battle of France — but, after the successful Balkan campaign, he was elevated to commander of the 440th Infantry Regiment in July 1941 and, in October, he was promoted to Oberst (Colonel). At that time, his regiment was posted in Greece, charged with occupational duties, and the 164th Infantry Regiment was merged with the 713th Infantry Division (713. Infanterie–Division) to form the Fortress Division "Crete" (Festungsdivision Kreta). In July 1942, the more combat-effective parts of the 16th Infantry Division were transported to North Africa to fight with Erwin Rommel's Afrika Korps. Larisch, still deemed unfit for active combat duty, remained in Greece, and from October to November 1942 he commanded one of the units of the Festungsdivision Kreta that were left behind, the 1st Fortress Brigade (Festungsbrigade 1) with HQ in Thessaloniki. On 23 November 1942, the staff of the unit was transferred to the north and became the German Railway Security Staff Croatia (Deutscher Eisenbahn–Sicherungsstab Kroatien). In this capacity, Larisch was responsible for the protection of the essential railroad transport in the puppet Independent State of Croatia, from acts of sabotage by the partisan movement active there. Larisch held this position in 1943; whether his units were implicated in war crimes is unknown.

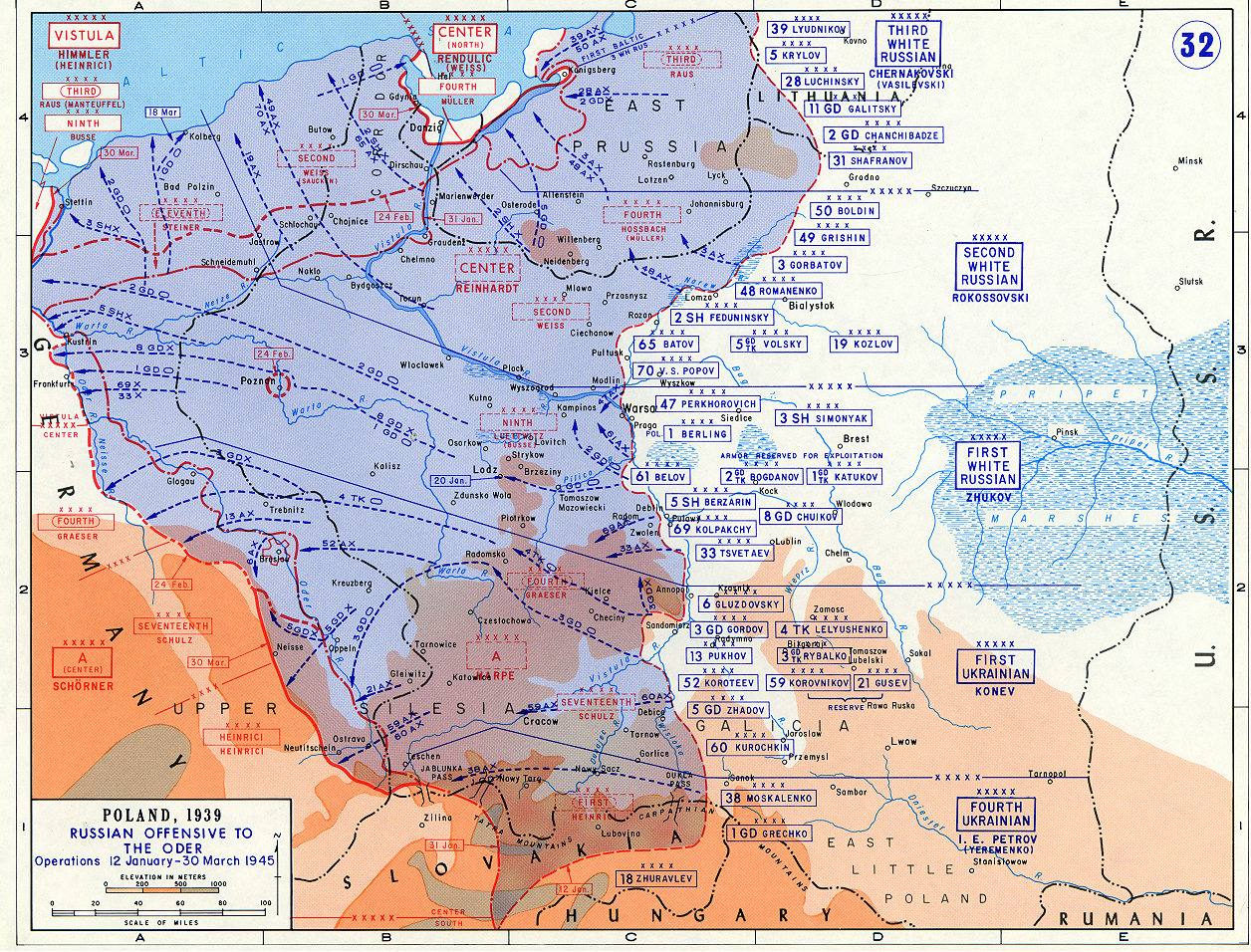
Operations at the Eastern Front, January to March 1945. The defensive line, which Larisch's 129th Infantry Division defended, lies along the river Narew, north of Warsaw, a tributary of Vistula river.

By 1943, Larisch had completed 10 years of troop service, but hadn't yet received a combat assignment. Presumably, he had earned sufficiently good evaluations from his superiors to be considered as a future divisional leader, so, in the summer of 1943, he took part in a one-month divisional leaders course in Berlin. He returned to Croatia in August and, on 1 November 1943, he was given the command of the 78th Sturm Division, one of the strongest, best-equipped and most effective combat units of the Eastern Front. When Larisch took over the command, the division was engaged in heavy fighting with the Red Army, as the Soviets attempted to capture the vital Moscow–Minsk highway, connecting Smolensk to Orsha. The battles lasted throughout the whole winter, and the division was able to form a defensive line and complete, for the time being, its objective.

On 15 February 1944, Larisch became commander of the 129th Infantry Division (129. Infanterie-Division), and was promoted to Generalmajor (Major General) on 1 April 1944. When, in June 1944, the Soviets launched a massive offensive (Operation Bagration), the 129th Infantry Division initially escaped total decimation, like many of the units of Army Group Center, but suffered heavy losses during the fighting in Belorussia. Arguably, Larisch's finest moment came in late summer 1944, when his division was defending the Narew river against the Soviet assault. The German units had set up strong defenses along the river, including trenches, barbed wire, obstacles and minefields, and manage to prevent the Soviets from breaking through. This defensive success was met with visible enthusiasm from Larisch's superiors: on 1 September 1944, he was decorated with the German Cross in Gold. In addition, he was promoted to Generalleutnant (Lieutenant General) on 1 October, a few weeks later, and in late December he was awarded with the Knight's Cross of the Iron Cross, one of Nazi Germany's highest and most prestigious military decorations.

=== Late war ===
The defensive line at Narew was overrun during another large-scale Soviet offensive in January 1945. While the winter had caused the marshes to freeze, making the terrain impermeable to attacks, this line was smashed and the German units were forced to retreat. By then, the 129th Infantry Division had suffered such heavy losses that it effectively ceased to exist as combat formation; Larisch gave up command of what remained of his division on 15 February 1945.

For the remainder of the war, Larisch was posted as commander of Infantry School Döberitz. Anticipating the Soviet assault on Berlin, the school had been moved to Grafenwöhr in the Upper Palatinate. He remained in that position until 24 April, when he was placed in the "Leader's Reserve" (Führerreserve).

Larisch continued to direct the regimental commanders course that had started in March. By late April 1945, the course continued to take place in Krün, a municipality in Southern Bavaria, adjacent to Tyrol. When Hitler's suicide became known on 30 April, the course came to an end. Before relieving the officers of their duties, Larisch assembled them in the local schoolhouse. His parting words were: "What you have learned in the past weeks was certainly not in vain, for just a few years from now, there will be a new German Army!"

== Post–war ==
After the war ended with the unconditional surrender of Germany on 8 May 1945, Larisch was able to evade capture for more than a month, but was arrested by American troops on 15 June 1945. He spent the next two years as a prisoner of war and was released on 1 July 1947, a few weeks shy of his 53rd birthday.

Upon returning to Germany, Larisch and his wife settled in Hamburg in northern West Germany. With the exception of his only son, who went missing in action on 1 July 1944 in the northern sector of the Eastern Front, all of his immediate family had survived the war. His Pomeranian estates were annexed by Poland. Thus, the family lived in strained conditions for some time; his daughter, Karin, a veterinarian, emigrated with her family to the United States of America in the 1950s.

Larisch spent his last years quietly in retirement. He served as chairman of the Officers' Association (Offiziersverein) of his old regiment (the 18th Dragoon Regiment). Larisch died on 16 May 1972 at the age of 77.

== Awards ==
- Knight's Cross of the Iron Cross on 26 December 1944 as Generalleutnant and commander of the 129. Infanterie Division

== Works ==
- Das 2. Grossherzogl. Mecklenburg. Dragoner–Regiment Nr. 18 im Weltkriege 1914–1918 (102nd volume of Erinnerungsblätter Deutscher Regimenter). Oldenburg in Oldenburg, Germany: Gerhard Stalling, 1924.

Military offices
Preceded by Generalleutnant Hans Traut	Commander of 78. Sturm–Division; 1 November 1943 – 15 February 1944	Succeeded by General der Infanterie Siegfried Rasp
Preceded by Generalmajor Karl Fabiunke	Commander of 129. Infanterie–Division; 15 February 1944 – 11 February 1945	Succeeded by Generalmajor Bernhard Ueberschär
Preceded by Generalmajor Heinrich Wittkopf	Commander of Infanterie–Schule Döberitz; 15 March 1945 – 24 April 1945	Succeeded by none dissolved
