= Przytok, West Pomeranian Voivodeship =

Przytok
- Settlement
- Location within Poland
- Coordinates: 54°13′0″N 16°24′34″E
- Country: Poland
- Voivodeship: West Pomeranian
- County: Koszalin
- Gmina: Sianów

Przytok [ˈpʂɨtɔk] is a settlement in the administrative district of Gmina Sianów, within Koszalin County, West Pomeranian Voivodeship, in north-western Poland. It lies approximately 8 km (5 mi) east of Sianów, 16 km (10 mi) east of Koszalin, and 150 km (93 mi) north-east of the regional capital Szczecin.
