= Suszka, West Pomeranian Voivodeship =

Suszka
- Settlement
- Location within Poland
- Coordinates: 54°13′43″N 16°30′52″E
- Country: Poland
- Voivodeship: West Pomeranian
- County: Koszalin
- Gmina: Sianów

Suszka [ˈsuʂka] is a settlement in the administrative district of Gmina Sianów, within Koszalin County, West Pomeranian Voivodeship, in north-western Poland. It lies approximately 15 km (9 mi) east of Sianów, 23 km (14 mi) east of Koszalin, and 156 km (97 mi) north-east of the regional capital Szczecin.

For the history of the region, see History of Pomerania.
