= Kędzierzyn, West Pomeranian Voivodeship =

Kędzierzyn
- Village
- Location within Poland
- Coordinates: 54°13′40″N 16°13′42″E
- Country: Poland
- Voivodeship: West Pomeranian
- County: Koszalin
- Gmina: Sianów
- Population: 80

Kędzierzyn [kɛnˈd͡ʑɛʐɨn] is a village in the administrative district of Gmina Sianów, within Koszalin County, West Pomeranian Voivodeship, in north-western Poland. It lies approximately 5 km (3 mi) west of Sianów, 6 km (4 mi) north-east of Koszalin, and 141 km (88 mi) north-east of the regional capital Szczecin.

The village has a population of 80.
