= Mokre, Koszalin County =

Mokre
- Village
- Location within Poland
- Coordinates: 54°10′17″N 16°24′26″E
- Country: Poland
- Voivodeship: West Pomeranian
- County: Koszalin
- Gmina: Sianów

Mokre [ˈmɔkrɛ] is a village in the administrative district of Gmina Sianów, within Koszalin County, West Pomeranian Voivodeship, in north-western Poland. It lies approximately 10 km (6 mi) south-east of Sianów, 15 km (9 mi) east of Koszalin, and 147 km (91 mi) north-east of the regional capital Szczecin.
