= Grabówko, West Pomeranian Voivodeship =

Grabówko
- Village
- Location within Poland
- Coordinates: 54°17′24″N 16°25′3″E
- Country: Poland
- Voivodeship: West Pomeranian
- County: Koszalin
- Gmina: Sianów

Grabówko [ɡraˈbufkɔ] is a village in the administrative district of Gmina Sianów, within Koszalin County, West Pomeranian Voivodeship, in north-western Poland. It lies approximately 11 km (7 mi) north-east of Sianów, 20 km (12 mi) north-east of Koszalin, and 155 km (96 mi) north-east of the regional capital Szczecin.
