= Wierciszewo, West Pomeranian Voivodeship =

Wierciszewo
- Village
- Location within Poland
- Coordinates: 54°17′0″N 16°18′34″E
- Country: Poland
- Voivodeship: West Pomeranian
- County: Koszalin
- Gmina: Sianów
- Population: 356

Wierciszewo [vjɛrt͡ɕiˈʂɛvɔ] (German Wandhagen) is a village in the administrative district of Gmina Sianów, within Koszalin County, West Pomeranian Voivodeship, in north-western Poland. It lies approximately 6 km (4 mi) north of Sianów, 14 km (9 mi) north-east of Koszalin, and 149 km (93 mi) north-east of the regional capital Szczecin.

For the history of the region, see History of Pomerania.

The village has a population of 356.
