= Wonieść, West Pomeranian Voivodeship =

Wonieść
- Settlement
- Location within Poland
- Coordinates: 54°10′14″N 16°21′58″E
- Country: Poland
- Voivodeship: West Pomeranian
- County: Koszalin
- Gmina: Sianów

Wonieść [ˈvɔɲɛɕt͡ɕ] is a settlement in the administrative district of Gmina Sianów, within Koszalin County, West Pomeranian Voivodeship, in north-western Poland. It lies approximately 8 km (5 mi) south-east of Sianów, 12 km (7 mi) east of Koszalin, and 145 km (90 mi) north-east of the regional capital Szczecin.

For the history of the region, see History of Pomerania.
