= Rzepkowo =

- Village
- Location within Poland
- Coordinates: 54°17′16″N 16°15′25″E
- Country: Poland
- Voivodeship: West Pomeranian
- County: Koszalin
- Gmina: Sianów

Rzepkowo [ʐɛpˈkɔvɔ] is a village in the administrative district of Gmina Sianów, within Koszalin County, West Pomeranian Voivodeship, in north-western Poland. It lies approximately 7 km (4 mi) north-west of Sianów, 13 km (8 mi) north-east of Koszalin, and 147 km (91 mi) north-east of the regional capital Szczecin.
