= Trawica =

- Settlement
- Location within Poland
- Coordinates: 54°14′29″N 16°20′53″E
- Country: Poland
- Voivodeship: West Pomeranian
- County: Koszalin
- Gmina: Sianów

Trawica [traˈvit͡sa] is a settlement in the administrative district of Gmina Sianów, within Koszalin County, West Pomeranian Voivodeship, in north-western Poland. It lies approximately 4 km (2 mi) east of Sianów, 13 km (8 mi) north-east of Koszalin, and 148 km (92 mi) north-east of the regional capital Szczecin.

For the history of the region, see History of Pomerania.
