= Kołzin =

- Settlement
- Location within Poland
- Coordinates: 54°16′11″N 16°19′26″E
- Country: Poland
- Voivodeship: West Pomeranian
- County: Koszalin
- Gmina: Sianów

Kołzin [ˈkɔu̯ʑin] is a settlement in the administrative district of Gmina Sianów, within Koszalin County, West Pomeranian Voivodeship, in north-western Poland. It lies approximately 5 km (3 mi) north of Sianów, 14 km (9 mi) north-east of Koszalin, and 149 km (93 mi) north-east of the regional capital Szczecin.
