= Osieki, West Pomeranian Voivodeship =

Osieki
- Village
- Location within Poland
- Coordinates: 54°17′4″N 16°13′6″E
- Country: Poland
- Voivodeship: West Pomeranian
- County: Koszalin
- Gmina: Sianów
- Population: 444

Osieki (Polish pronunciation: [ɔˈɕɛki]; German: Wusseken) is a village in the administrative district of Gmina Sianów, within Koszalin County, West Pomeranian Voivodeship, in north-western Poland. It lies approximately 8 km (5 mi) northwest of Sianów, 12 km (7 mi) north of Koszalin, and 145 km (90 mi) northeast of the regional capital Szczecin.

The village has a population of 444.
