= Sierakowo Sławieńskie =

- Village
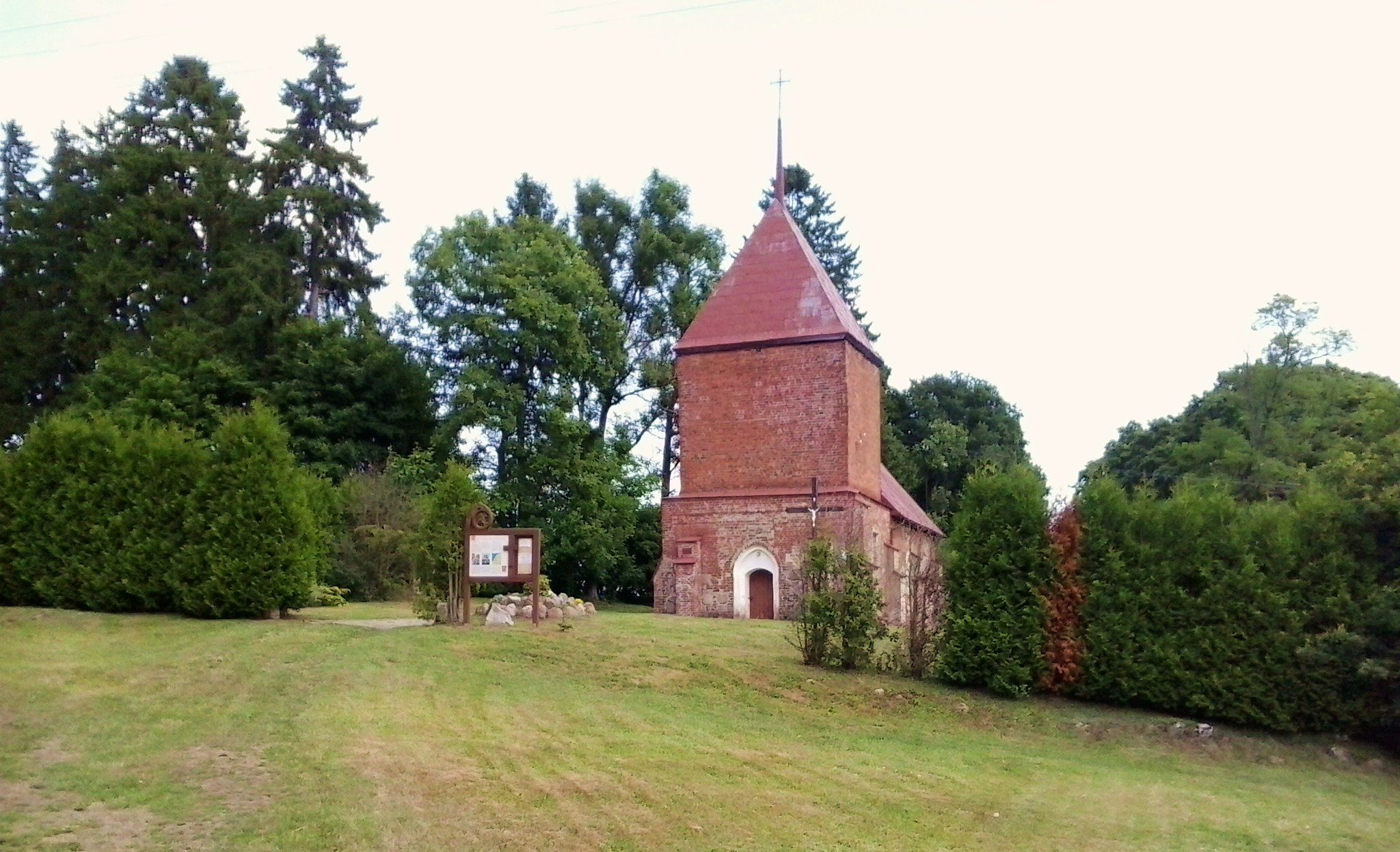
- Church of Our Lady of the Rosary

- Location within Poland
- Coordinates: 54°13′28″N 16°31′18″E
- Country: Poland
- Voivodeship: West Pomeranian
- County: Koszalin
- Gmina: Sianów

Population
  - Total: 510

Sierakowo Sławieńskie [ɕɛraˈkɔvɔ swaˈvjɛɲskʲɛ] (German: Zirchow) is a village in the administrative district of Gmina Sianów, within Koszalin County, West Pomeranian Voivodeship, in north-western Poland. It lies approximately 15 km (9 mi) east of Sianów, 23 km (14 mi) east of Koszalin, and 156 km (97 mi) north-east of the regional capital Szczecin.

The village has a population of 510.
