= Sucha Koszalińska =

- Village
- Location within Poland
- Coordinates: 54°15′34″N 16°16′1″E
- Country: Poland
- Voivodeship: West Pomeranian
- County: Koszalin
- Gmina: Sianów

Sucha Koszalińska [ˈsuxa kɔʂaˈliɲska] (German Zuchen) is a village in the administrative district of Gmina Sianów, within Koszalin County, West Pomeranian Voivodeship, in north-western Poland. It lies approximately 4 km (2 mi) north-west of Sianów, 11 km (7 mi) north-east of Koszalin, and 145 km (90 mi) north-east of the regional capital Szczecin.

For the history of the region, see History of Pomerania.
