= Sieciemin =

- Village
- Location within Poland
- Coordinates: 54°14′44″N 16°24′54″E
- Country: Poland
- Voivodeship: West Pomeranian
- County: Koszalin
- Gmina: Sianów

Sieciemin [ɕɛˈt͡ɕɛmin] (German Zitzmin) is a village in the administrative district of Gmina Sianów, within Koszalin County, West Pomeranian Voivodeship, in north-western Poland. It lies approximately 8 km (5 mi) east of Sianów, 17 km (11 mi) north-east of Koszalin, and 152 km (94 mi) north-east of the regional capital Szczecin.
