= Krzykacz, West Pomeranian Voivodeship =

Krzykacz
- Settlement
- Location within Poland
- Coordinates: 54°14′17″N 16°22′48″E
- Country: Poland
- Voivodeship: West Pomeranian
- County: Koszalin
- Gmina: Sianów

Krzykacz [ˈkʂɨkat͡ʂ] is a settlement in the administrative district of Gmina Sianów, within Koszalin County, West Pomeranian Voivodeship, in north-western Poland. It lies approximately 6 km (4 mi) east of Sianów, 15 km (9 mi) north-east of Koszalin, and 150 km (93 mi) north-east of the regional capital Szczecin.
