= Kleszcze =

Kleszcze may refer to the following places:

- Kleszcze, Podlaskie Voivodeship (north-east Poland)
- Kleszcze, Koszalin County in West Pomeranian Voivodeship (north-west Poland)
- Kleszcze, Stargard County in West Pomeranian Voivodeship (north-west Poland)
