= Gorzebądz, Koszalin County =

Gorzebądz
- Village
- Location within Poland
- Coordinates: 54°13′N 16°15′E
- Country: Poland
- Voivodeship: West Pomeranian
- County: Koszalin
- Gmina: Sianów

Gorzebądz [ɡɔˈʐɛbɔnt͡s] is a village in the administrative district of Gmina Sianów, within Koszalin County, West Pomeranian Voivodeship, in north-western Poland. It lies approximately 4 km (2 mi) south-west of Sianów, 6 km (4 mi) north-east of Koszalin, and 141 km (88 mi) north-east of the regional capital Szczecin.
