= Gracz, West Pomeranian Voivodeship =

Gracz
- Settlement
- Location within Poland
- Coordinates: 54°15′2″N 16°21′13″E
- Country: Poland
- Voivodeship: West Pomeranian
- County: Koszalin
- Gmina: Sianów

Gracz [ɡrat͡ʂ] is a settlement in the administrative district of Gmina Sianów, within Koszalin County, West Pomeranian Voivodeship, in north-western Poland. It lies approximately 5 km (3 mi) north-east of Sianów, 14 km (9 mi) north-east of Koszalin, and 149 km (93 mi) north-east of the regional capital Szczecin.
