= Płonka, West Pomeranian Voivodeship =

Płonka
- Settlement
- Location within Poland
- Coordinates: 54°16′14″N 16°21′29″E
- Country: Poland
- Voivodeship: West Pomeranian
- County: Koszalin
- Gmina: Sianów

Płonka [ˈpwɔnka] is a settlement in the administrative district of Gmina Sianów, within Koszalin County, West Pomeranian Voivodeship, in north-western Poland. It lies approximately 6 km (4 mi) north-east of Sianów, 15 km (9 mi) north-east of Koszalin, and 151 km (94 mi) north-east of the regional capital Szczecin.
