= Dąbrowa, Koszalin County =

Dąbrowa
- Village
- Location within Poland
- Coordinates: 54°16′33″N 16°23′37″E
- Country: Poland
- Voivodeship: West Pomeranian
- County: Koszalin
- Gmina: Sianów

Dąbrowa [dɔmˈbrɔva] (German: Damerow) is a village in the administrative district of Gmina Sianów, within Koszalin County, West Pomeranian Voivodeship, in north-western Poland. It lies approximately 9 km (6 mi) north-east of Sianów, 18 km (11 mi) north-east of Koszalin, and 153 km (95 mi) north-east of the regional capital Szczecin.
