= Skwierzynka =

- Village
- Location within Poland
- Coordinates: 54°13′50″N 16°12′7″E
- Country: Poland
- Voivodeship: West Pomeranian
- County: Koszalin
- Gmina: Sianów

Skwierzynka [skfjɛˈʐɨnka] is a village in the administrative district of Gmina Sianów, within Koszalin County, West Pomeranian Voivodeship, in north-western Poland. It lies approximately 7 km (4 mi) west of Sianów, 6 km (4 mi) north of Koszalin, and 140 km (87 mi) north-east of the regional capital Szczecin.

For the history of the region, see History of Pomerania.
