= Sowieński Młyn =

- Settlement
- Location within Poland
- Coordinates: 54°12′8″N 16°30′12″E
- Country: Poland
- Voivodeship: West Pomeranian
- County: Koszalin
- Gmina: Sianów
- Population: 25

Sowieński Młyn [sɔˈvjɛɲski ˈmwɨn] is a settlement in the administrative district of Gmina Sianów, within Koszalin County, West Pomeranian Voivodeship, in north-western Poland. It lies approximately 14 km (9 mi) east of Sianów, 21 km (13 mi) east of Koszalin, and 154 km (96 mi) north-east of the regional capital Szczecin.

For the history of the region, see History of Pomerania.

The settlement has a population of 25.
