= Szczeglino =

- Village
- Location within Poland
- Coordinates: 54°10′52″N 16°22′57″E
- Country: Poland
- Voivodeship: West Pomeranian
- County: Koszalin
- Gmina: Sianów

Szczeglino [ʂt͡ʂɛˈɡlinɔ] (German Steglin) is a village in the administrative district of Gmina Sianów, within Koszalin County, West Pomeranian Voivodeship, in north-western Poland. It lies approximately 8 km (5 mi) south-east of Sianów, 13 km (8 mi) east of Koszalin, and 146 km (91 mi) north-east of the regional capital Szczecin.

For the history of the region, see History of Pomerania.
