= Maszkowo, Koszalin County =

Maszkowo
- Village
- Location within Poland
- Coordinates: 54°10′59″N 16°18′29″E
- Country: Poland
- Voivodeship: West Pomeranian
- County: Koszalin
- Gmina: Sianów

Maszkowo [maʂˈkɔvɔ] is a village in the administrative district of Gmina Sianów, within Koszalin County, West Pomeranian Voivodeship, in north-western Poland. It lies approximately 6 km (4 mi) south of Sianów, 9 km (6 mi) east of Koszalin, and 142 km (88 mi) north-east of the regional capital Szczecin.
