= Ratajki =

- Village
- Location within Poland
- Coordinates: 54°12′32″N 16°27′55″E
- Country: Poland
- Voivodeship: West Pomeranian
- County: Koszalin
- Gmina: Sianów

Ratajki [raˈtai̯ki] (German: Ratteick) is a village in the administrative district of Gmina Sianów, within Koszalin County, West Pomeranian Voivodeship, in north-western Poland. It lies approximately 12 km (7 mi) east of Sianów, 19 km (12 mi) east of Koszalin, and 152 km (94 mi) north-east of the regional capital Szczecin.
