= Węgorzewo Koszalińskie =

- Village
- Location within Poland
- Coordinates: 54°11′46″N 16°21′26″E
- Country: Poland
- Voivodeship: West Pomeranian
- County: Koszalin
- Gmina: Sianów
- Population: 299

Węgorzewo Koszalińskie [vɛnɡɔˈʐɛvɔ kɔʂaˈliɲskʲɛ] (formerly German Vangerow) is a village in the administrative district of Gmina Sianów, within Koszalin County, West Pomeranian Voivodeship, in north-western Poland. It lies approximately 6 km (4 mi) south-east of Sianów, 12 km (7 mi) east of Koszalin, and 146 km (91 mi) north-east of the regional capital Szczecin.

For the history of the region, see History of Pomerania.

The village has a population of 299.
