= Borowiec, Koszalin County =

Borowiec
- Settlement
- Location within Poland
- Coordinates: 54°12′2″N 16°27′4″E
- Country: Poland
- Voivodeship: West Pomeranian
- County: Koszalin
- Gmina: Sianów

Borowiec [bɔˈrɔvjɛt͡s] is a settlement in the administrative district of Gmina Sianów, within Koszalin County, West Pomeranian Voivodeship, in north-western Poland. It lies approximately 11 km (7 mi) east of Sianów, 18 km (11 mi) east of Koszalin, and 151 km (94 mi) north-east of the regional capital Szczecin.
