= Sierakówko, West Pomeranian Voivodeship =

Sierakówko
- Settlement
- Location within Poland
- Coordinates: 54°12′44″N 16°30′47″E
- Country: Poland
- Voivodeship: West Pomeranian
- County: Koszalin
- Gmina: Sianów

Sierakówko [ɕɛraˈkufkɔ] is a settlement in the administrative district of Gmina Sianów, within Koszalin County, West Pomeranian Voivodeship, in north-western Poland. It lies approximately 15 km (9 mi) east of Sianów, 22 km (14 mi) east of Koszalin, and 155 km (96 mi) north-east of the regional capital Szczecin.
