= Kleszcze, Koszalin County =

Kleszcze
- Village
- Location within Poland
- Coordinates: 54°16′9″N 16°14′20″E
- Country: Poland
- Voivodeship: West Pomeranian
- County: Koszalin
- Gmina: Sianów

Kleszcze [ˈklɛʂt͡ʂɛ] is a village in the administrative district of Gmina Sianów, within Koszalin County, West Pomeranian Voivodeship, in north-western Poland. It lies approximately 6 km (4 mi) north-west of Sianów, 11 km (7 mi) north of Koszalin, and 145 km (90 mi) north-east of the regional capital Szczecin.
