= Gmina Sianów =

Gmina Sianów Sianów Commune
- Gmina
- Flag Coat of arms
- Interactive map of Gmina Sianów
- Coordinates (Sianów): 54°13′49″N 16°17′51″E
- Country: Poland
- Voivodeship: West Pomeranian
- County: Koszalin County
- Seat: Sianów

Area
  - Total: 226.78 km^{2} (87.56 sq mi)

Population (2006)
  - Total: 13,251
  - Density: 58.431/km^{2} (151.34/sq mi)
  - Urban: 6,543
  - Rural: 6,708
- Website: http://www.sianow.pl/

Gmina Sianów is an urban-rural gmina (administrative district) in Koszalin County, West Pomeranian Voivodeship, in north-western Poland. Its seat is the town of Sianów, which lies approximately 10 kilometres (6 mi) north-east of Koszalin and 145 km (90 mi) north-east of the regional capital Szczecin.

The gmina covers an area of 226.78 square kilometres (87.6 sq mi), and as of 2006 its total population is 13,251 (out of which the population of Sianów amounts to 6,543, and the population of the rural part of the gmina is 6,708).

== Villages ==
Apart from the town of Sianów, Gmina Sianów contains the villages and settlements of Bielkowo, Borowiec, Dąbrowa, Gorzebądz, Grabówko, Gracz, Iwięcino, Karnieszewice, Kędzierzyn, Kleszcze, Kłos, Kołzin, Kościerza, Krzykacz, Maszkowo, Mokre, Osieki, Płonka, Przytok, Ratajki, Rzepkowo, Sieciemin, Siecieminek, Sierakówko, Sierakowo Sławieńskie, Skibienko, Skibno, Skwierzynka, Sowieński Młyn, Sowno, Sucha Koszalińska, Suszka, Szczeglino, Szczeglino Nowe, Trawica, Węgorzewo Koszalińskie, Wierciszewo and Wonieść.

== Neighbouring gminas ==
Gmina Sianów is bordered by the city of Koszalin and by the gminas of Będzino, Darłowo, Malechowo, Manowo, Mielno and Polanów.
