= Skibno =

- Village
- Location within Poland
- Coordinates: 54°14′34″N 16°17′51″E
- Country: Poland
- Voivodeship: West Pomeranian
- County: Koszalin
- Gmina: Sianów

Skibno [ˈskibnɔ] (German: Schübben) is a village in the administrative district of Gmina Sianów, within Koszalin County, West Pomeranian Voivodeship, in north-western Poland. It lies approximately 2 km (1 mi) north of Sianów, 10 km (6 mi) north-east of Koszalin, and 146 km (91 mi) north-east of the regional capital Szczecin.

For the history of the region, see History of Pomerania.
