= Sowno, Koszalin County =

Sowno
- Village
- Location within Poland
- Coordinates: 54°11′0″N 16°31′0″E
- Country: Poland
- Voivodeship: West Pomeranian
- County: Koszalin
- Gmina: Sianów

Sowno (Polish pronunciation: [ˈsɔvnɔ]; German: Alt Zowen) is a village in the administrative district of Gmina Sianów, within Koszalin County, West Pomeranian Voivodeship, in north-western Poland. It lies approximately 16 km (10 mi) east of Sianów, 22 km (14 mi) east of Koszalin, and 153 km (95 mi) north-east of the regional capital Szczecin.

For the history of the region, see History of Pomerania.
