= Emily A. Buchholtz =

American paleontologist

Emily A. Buchholtz is a vertebrate paleontologist, interested in morphology, evolution, and development at Wellesley College. She is best known for her published journal of The therian sternum at the lateral somitic frontier: Evolution of a composite structure alongside recognition as an AAAS fellow in 2015 and a current Gordon P. Lang and Althea P. Lang ‘26 Professor Emerita of Biological Sciences.

== Education ==
Emily A. Buchholtz received her B.A. from College of Wooster, her M.A. from University of Wisconsin, and her Ph.D. from George Washington University. She is also an amateur cellist, and has been a member of the Cambridge Symphony Orchestra for 14 years. While retired, Emily A. Buchholtz has multiple projects in progress at Wellesley College.

=== Research ===
Buchholtz studies vertebrate paleontology with an interest in morphology, evolution and development. Her interests are within the patterns of morphological diversity during the embryological development of the individual and during the evolution of lineages over geologic time. Her previous work examined transformations of the column in terrestrial lineages that secondarily adopted aquatic lifestyles: sirenians, ichthyosaurs, and whales. Her more recent work has concentrated on the developmental processes by which the mammalian vertebral column has become progressively more regionalized over evolutionary time. Her most well known published research suggests that "Sternal morphology suggests that the therian sternum is a casestudy of evolutionary tinkering." She is also a current member of the Society of Vertebrate Paleontology.

=== Career ===
Buchholtz was a professor at The Wellesley College for numerous years teaching courses in organismal biology, evolution, comparative physiology and anatomy, and the history of life. She taught as an adjunct professor at The University of Wisconsin - Milwaukee. She is now recognized in the Emeriti faculty of Wellesley College. She worked with the field program at the Milwaukee Public Museum and is an advocate for women in paleontology. She has presented to non-scientific audiences about issues at the interface of science and religion, and presented the Townes Lecture at the 2009 General Synod of the United Church of Christ Buchholtz has also participated in multiple interviews published in science.org, smithsonianmag.com and scientificamerican.com. She has done extensive work with pachycephalosaurians, in which the name Sphaerotholus buchholtzae honored her work.

== Recent and notable publications ==
- Buchholtz EA, Yozgyur ZM, Feldman A, Weaver AA and Gaudin TJ. 2020. The therian sternum at the lateral somitic frontier: Evolution of a composite structure. Journal of Zoology https://doi.org/10.1111/jzo.12809
- Buchholtz, E.A.; Yozgyur, Z.M.; Weaver, A.A.; Gaudin, T.J. 2019. Homology and modularity in the mammalian sternum. Journal of Morphology 280: S47.
- Buchholtz EA 2017. Finding sacral: Developmental evolution of the axial skeleton of odontocetes (Cetacea). Evolution & Development, 19(4-5): 190-204.
- Buchholtz EA 2014. Crossing the frontier: a hypothesis for the origins of meristic constraint in mammalian axial patterning. Zoology 117: 64-69.
- Buchholtz EA, Wayrynen KL, and Lin IW. 2014. Breaking Constraint: Axial Patterning in Trichechus (Mammalia: Sirenia). Evolution & Development 16: 382-393.
- Buchholtz, EA. 2012. Flexibility and constraint: patterning the axial skeleton in mammals, pp. 230–256 in From Clone to Bone: The Synergy of Morphological and Molecular Tools in Paleobiology, R. J. Asher and J.Müller, eds. Cambridge University Press, Cambridge.
- Buchholtz EA, Bailin HG, Laves JT, Yang JT, Chan, M-Y, and Drozd LE. 2012. Fixed cervical count and the origin of the mammalian diaphragm. Evolution & Development 15(5): 399-411.
- Buchholtz EA. 2010. Vertebral and rib anatomy in Caperea marginata: implications for evolutionary patterning of the mammalian vertebral column. Marine Mammal Science 27(2) 382-397.
- Buchholtz EA and Stepien CC. 2009. Anatomical transformation in mammals: developmental origin of aberrant cervical anatomy in tree sloths. Evolution & Development 11(1): 69-79.

== Awards and leadership ==
- AAAS fellow - 2015 Biological Sciences
- Member of the Society of Vertebrate Paleontology
