= Matthias Buchholz =

German violist, chamber musician, and professor

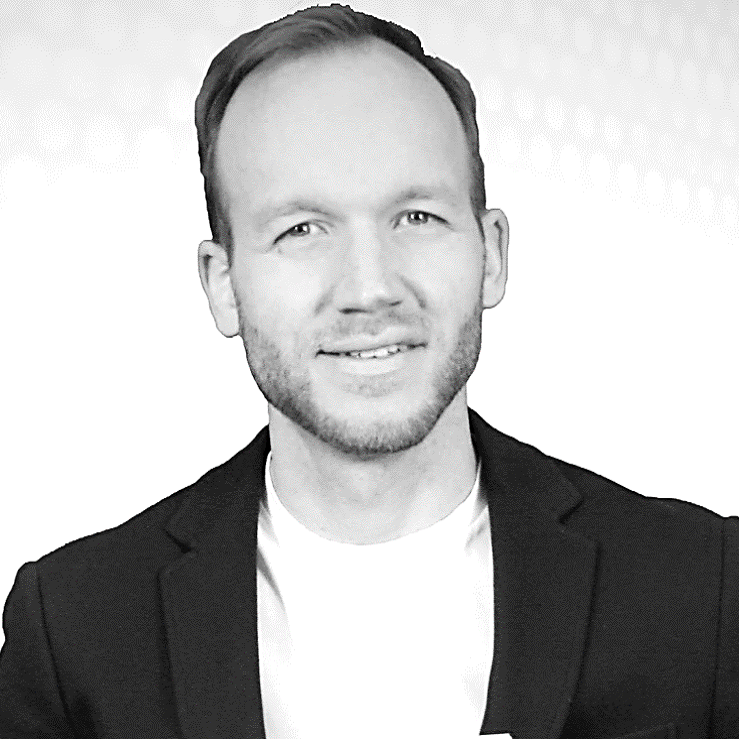
Image of Matthias Buchholz

Matthias Buchholz (born 14 December 1957 in Hamburg) is a German violist, chamber musician, and professor of viola at leading music institutions in Cologne and Geneva.

== Biography ==
Buchholz began his music studies in Hamburg before continuing at the University of Cincinnati, the Detmold Academy of Music, and the Curtis Institute of Music in Philadelphia. He gained recognition as a laureate at international viola competitions in Bonn (1978), Los Angeles (1981), and Budapest (1984).

Since 1976, Buchholz has performed widely as a soloist and chamber musician. He has collaborated with ensembles such as the American String Quartet and the Auryn Quartet, appearing across Europe, North and South America, and Asia. In 1991, he became a member of the Linos Ensemble, contributing to numerous recordings and tours in Europe and Southeast Asia.

Between 2003 and 2008, he co-founded the Heine Quartet. In 2006, the quartet premiered Adagio für Streichquartett, dedicated to Robert Schumann by Aribert Reimann, during the Düsseldorfer Schumannfest.

In 1986, Buchholz was appointed principal violist of the Stuttgart Radio Symphony Orchestra (now SWR Symphonieorchester). Four years later, he became professor of viola at the Hochschule für Musik und Tanz Köln, one of Europe's leading conservatories. In 2013, he joined the Haute école de musique de Genève (HEM) as professor of viola, succeeding Nobuko Imai.

He has given masterclasses in Europe, North America, and Asia, including in Japan, Taiwan, China, and South Korea. He was also a member of the Hwaum Chamber Orchestra in Seoul.

Buchholz regularly appears at chamber music festivals such as Avignon, Cologne, Berlin, Marlboro, Hitzacker, Lyon, Schleswig–Holstein, Ottawa, Salzburg, and Mondsee.

He lives in Cologne and has three children.

== Selected recordings ==
- Schumann: Märchenbilder – Linos Ensemble (CPO Records, 2003)
- Brahms: String Quintets Op. 88 & Op. 111 – Linos Ensemble (GENUIN classics, 2010)
- Hindemith: Complete Viola Works – Solo & Chamber (Hänssler Classic, 2015)
- Mozart: String Quintets with Auryn Quartet (Tacet Records, 2018)

== Notable students ==
- [Name], principal viola, [orchestra name]
- [Name], professor of viola, [institution name]
- [Name], soloist and chamber musician
