= Nikolay Buchholtz =

Russian engineer (1881–1943)

- Born: Nikolay Nikolayevich Buchholtz; July 22, 1881; Ryazan, Russian Empire
- Died: December 14, 1943 (aged 62); Moscow, Soviet Union
- Occupation: Specialist in the field of analytical mechanics

Nikolay Nikolayevich Buchholtz (Russian: Николай Николаевич Бухгольц; 22 July 1881 — 14 December 1943) was a Soviet and Russian scientist and a specialist in the field of analytical mechanics. He was a Major-General of the Engineering and Aviation Service, Professor, Doctor of Physical and Mathematical Sciences, and a Laureate of the Stalin Prize.

== Biography ==
Nikolay Nikolayevich Buchholtz was born on 22 July 1881 in Ryazan. In 1914 he graduated from the Physics and Mathematics Faculty of Moscow University. He was Head of the Department of Theoretical Mechanics of Moscow Power Engineering Institute in 1930–1933. From 1933 to 1938, he was the Head of the Department of Elasticity Theory of Moscow State University.

From 1938 to 1943 he was the acting head of the Department of Theoretical Mechanics of Moscow State University (when the previous head of this department, Professor Aleksandr Nekrasov was imprisoned together with Andrei Tupolev). He also worked at the Zhukovsky Air Force Engineering Academy.

Now he in the first place is remembered as the author of Basic course of theoretical mechanics textbook, which was first published in 1932 and for many years had been the primary book on the topic of theoretical mechanics for Soviet students.

He lived in Moscow, in Plotnikov Lane, 20. He was a parishioner and altarpiece of the St. Nicholas Church of the Carpenters in Moscow. Nikolay Buchholtz died on 13 December 1943 and was buried at Novodevichy Cemetery in Moscow.
