= Robert Buchholz =

American singer, pianist and composer (1954–1994)

Robert Buchholz (1954-1994) was an American singer, pianist and composer.

Buchholz was born in Shelby, Nebraska. A graduate of the University of Nebraska–Lincoln, he continued his graduate work at Ball State University, studying under mentorship of Richard Rodney Bennett and Maury Yeston. Known as Buck, after graduation, Buchholz performed in many venues including; The Four Seasons Restaurant, the Rose Room of Algonquin Hotel, and the Duplex. He also composed and arranged music for Charles M. Schulz's Peanuts and had appeared in Greetings From Washington, D.C. documentary. He died of AIDS at Cabrini Medical Center in Manhattan, New York.
