= Garth Von Buchholz =

Canadian author and educator

Garth von Buchholz
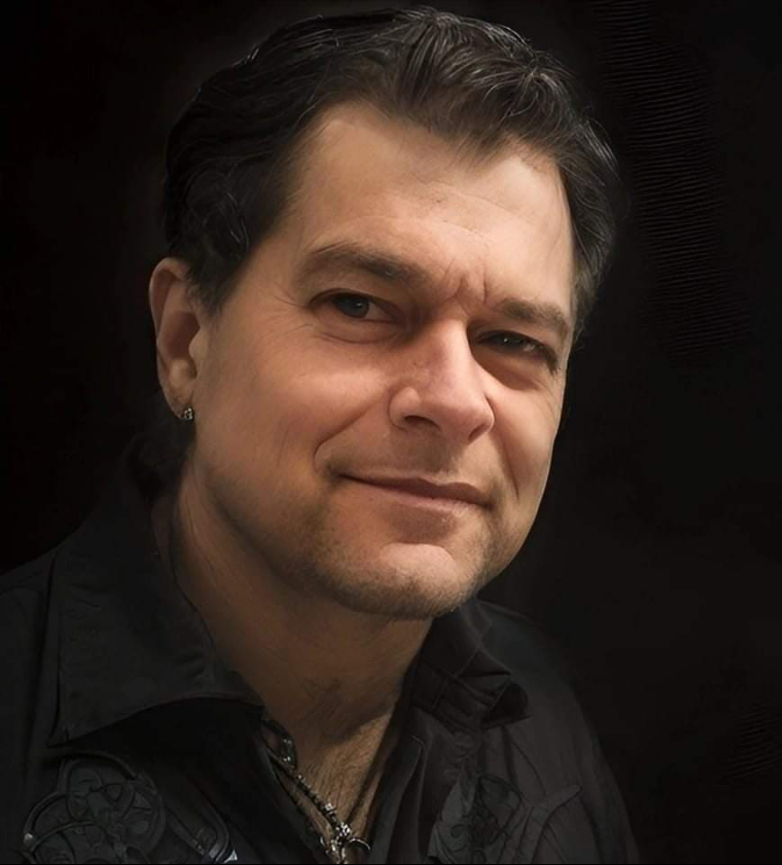
- Born: Winnipeg, Manitoba, Canada
- Occupations: educator, technologist, digital strategist, researcher
- Website: globalisland.ai

Garth von Buchholz is a Canadian educator, technologist, digital strategist, author, and researcher. He was born in Winnipeg, Manitoba, and raised in Winnipeg, Montreal, Quebec and Vancouver, British Columbia. He lives with his family in Victoria, British Columbia. Von Buchholz received his undergraduate degree at the University of Winnipeg and completed his graduate studies in educational technology at the University of British Columbia in 2024. He currently works in government as a senior user experience (UX) designer and is the principal of Global Island AI, an applied AI education and research firm. He was also a founding member of the BC+AI Ecosystem from 2025-2026.

Von Buchholz began his career in print publishing as a writer and editor in 1988, and later launched a new career in web publishing and digital content strategy in the mid-1990s. He was certified as a Usability Analyst by Human Factors International in 2005 and has worked as a digital communications manager for Investors Group (IGM Financial) and as the first corporate web manager for the City of Winnipeg.

In 2010 he was listed as one of the Top 25 Content Strategists (#16) at the LavaCon technology conference in San Diego, California.

From 2017 to 2020, he taught a four-week course on social media strategy at Royal Roads University in Victoria, British Columbia, Canada.

As an author, his works include Start-Up: Setting Up a New Media Business in Canada (2008) and several non-fiction books, such as The Encyclopedia of Manitoba (2007). His plays include Land of Milk and Honey, which was professionally workshopped in 1994 by the Manitoba Association of Playwrights at Prairie Theatre Exchange. His poetry and short fiction have been published in various print and online journals.

In addition to his literary writing, von Buchholz has written numerous stories and features as a professional journalist for several newspapers and magazines, such as Maclean's, Prairie Fire, The Globe and Mail and Dance Magazine. From 1998 to 2000, he wrote a weekly newspaper and website column titled Internet Today for the Winnipeg Free Press and Thomson New Media. Internet Today was one of the first weekly news columns in Canada that chronicled the growth of the Internet.

Von Buchholz was also the dance critic for the Winnipeg Free Press from 1990 to 2004, where he also covered theater, films, music, art and books. He has reviewed books for the New York Journal of Books in New York City.

In 2009, he produced the International Edgar Allan Poe Society, a popular online resource celebrating 19th century author Edgar Allan Poe and from 2012 to 2017 he created artistic photography for the Ballerina Project Canada.

His cultural volunteer work includes serving as a past board member for Ballet Victoria, Canadian Culture Online (Culture.ca), the University of Winnipeg's Global College, and Arts and Cultural Industries of Manitoba Inc.

== Publications ==
- Global Island AI (Blogger, 2024-2027)
- 157 Tips for Improving eLearning Design (Contributor, 2017)
- Start-Up: Setting Up a New Media Business in Canada and Teachers' Guide (Author, 2008)
- Anthologies, Chapbooks, Magazines, Newspapers and Online Journals (Contributor, 1988–2016)
