= Werner Buchholz (historian) =

German historian

Werner Buchholz (born 25 January 1948) is a German historian, currently a professor for Pomeranian History at the University of Greifswald.

== Biography ==
Buchholz was born in Berlin and studied History, Scandinavian and German studies at the Universities of Bochum, Marburg, Stockholm and at the Åbo Akademi in 1970–78.

He passed his doctorate in 1978 and worked as a teacher in 1979–85. Buchholz was awarded a scholarship of the Deutsche Forschungsgemeinschaft in 1985 and habilitated at the University of Hamburg on the history of public finance and financial administration in Swedish Pomerania (1720–1806) in 1990.

In 1992–94 he worked for the German Foreign Office in Athens and became a Professor for history and regional studies of Pomerania at the university of Greifswald in 1994.

== Publications ==
- Staat und Ständegesellschaft in Schweden zur Zeit des Überganges vom Absolutismus zum Ständeparlamentarismus 1718–1720. Almqvist och Wiksell International, Stockholm 1979, ISBN 91-22-00297-9.
- Geschichte der öffentlichen Finanzen in Europa in Spätmittelalter und Neuzeit: Darstellung, Analyse, Bibliographie. Akademieverlag, Berlin 1996, ISBN 3-05-003056-9.
- Pommern. Deutsche Geschichte im Osten Europas. Siedler, Berlin 1999, ISBN 3-88680-272-8.
- Kindheit und Jugend in der Neuzeit 1500–1990. Steiner, Stuttgart 2000, ISBN 3-515-07259-4.
