= Peter Buchholz (rabbi) =

German rabbi

Rabbi Dr. Peter Buchholz

Personal life
- Born: 2 October 1837 Bomst, Posen, Kingdom of Prussia
- Died: 20 September 1892 (aged 54) Emden, Hanover, German Empire
- Education: Jewish Theological Seminary of Breslau

Religious life
- Religion: Judaism
- Position: Landesrabbiner of Friesland
- Semikhah: 27 June 1863

Peter Buchholz (2 October 1837 – 20 September 1892) was a German rabbi who served from 1875 to 1892 as Landesrabbiner of Friesland.

== Biography ==
Buchholz received his rabbinical ordination on 27 June 1863, and became rabbi of Märkisch-Friedland later that year. There he remained until 1867, in which year he was called to the rabbinate of Stargard, Pomerania. On 2 April 1875 he became Landesrabbiner of Friesland, which position he filled with ability and distinction until his death. After 1882 he also served as Landesrabbiner of the district of Stade.

Buchholz was a good Talmudical scholar and well versed in modern philosophy. He was the author of a small work on the legal and moral relations of the family according to Jewish law, Die Familie in rechtlicher und moralischer Beziehung, nach mosaisch-talmudischer Lehre (Breslau, 1867); and some of his more important speeches and lectures were published by him or by his friends. He also wrote a number of articles on historical and other academic subjects in the Jewish periodicals of Germany, of which his "Historischer Ueberbliek über die mannigfachen Codifieationen des Halachastoffes" (Monatsschrift, 1864, pp. 201–241) and "R. Asarja Figa und seine Predigtsammlung 'Bina le-Ittim'" (Beilage zur Isr. Wochenschrift, 1872, nos. 4–9) are probably the most important.

== Publications ==
Buchholz's publications include the following:

- "Historischer Ueberbliek über die mannigfachen Codifieationen des Halachastoffes" [Historical Survey of the Many Codifications of Halachic Texts]. Frankl'sche Monatsschrift. 13: 201–217, 241–259. 1864.
- "Die modernen Romaneiers und die Juden" [Modern Novelists and the Jews]. Zeitschrift des Judenthums. 1865–1866.
- "Ma'amar Mordekhai". Ha-Maggid (in Hebrew). 15 (11).
- Die Familie in rechtlicher und moralischer Beziehung, nach mosaisch-talmudischer Lehre [The Family from Legal and Moral Perspectives, According to Mosaic-Talmudic Teachings]. Breslau: Sehletter'sche Buchhandlung. 1867.
- Bericht über die Religionsschule zu Stargard in Pommern, enthaltend folgende Abhandlungen: a) Cheder und Religionsschule. b) Die Religionsschule als Bildungsanstalt für künftige Gemeindeglieder. e) Die Religionsschule und die Euen [Report on the Religious School at Stargard in Pomerania].
- "Zur Charakteristik der Debatten über die confessionslose Schule im preussischen Abgeordnetenhaus" [On the Character of the Debates on Non-Denominational Schools in the Prussian House of Representatives]. Zeitung des Judenthums: 25. 1869.
- Reden, gehalten bei der Einweihung der neuen Synagoge zu Pyritz, am 15. September 1870 [Speeches delivered at the dedication of the new synagogue at Pyritz, 15 September 1870]. Berlin: Friedländer'sche Buchhandlung.
- Das moderne Risches [The Modern Risches]. Israel. Wochenschrift. Jahrg. 1870. p. 129.
- "Das deutsche Volk und die Juden" [The German People and the Jews]. Israel. Wochenschrift. Jahrg. (29): 30–31. 1871.
- Rede, gehalten bei der Einweihung der neuen Synagoge zu Bomst., am 6. Sept. 1871 [Speech delivered at the dedication of the new synagogue at Bomst, 6 September 1871]. Glogau: Eduard Mosse.
- "Ein alter bibliographischer Irrthum, betreffend Verwandtschaft des Mordechai ben Hillel mit R. Elieser ben Nathan" [an old bibliographical error concerning the relationship of Mordechai ben Hillel to R. Elieser ben Nathan]. Frankl-Graetz'sche Monatsschrift: 424. 1871.
- "Die beiden Isaac aus Dampiere" [The Two Isaacs of Dampiere]. Daselbst. Jahrgang: 417. 1872.
- "R. Asarja Figa und seine Predigtsammlung 'Bina le-Ittim'". Literar. Beilage zur Isr. Wochensch (4–9). 1872.
- Ueber häusliche Erziehung. Vortrag, gehalten im Bildungs-Verein zu Stargard in Pommern, am 14. Jänner 1874 [On Education in the Home]. Weber’sche Buchhandlung.
- Streitschrift gegen Pastor Hafermann [Polemic against Pastor Hafermann]. Emden: Hahn. 1876.
- "Bemerkungen zu Hausrath's 'Neutestamentliche Zeitgeschichte'". Rahm. Jüd. Literatur-Blatt (28–31). 1878.
