= Peter Buchholz (philologist) =

South African philologist

- Born: 1941 (age 84–85); Pretoria, South Africa

Academic background
- Education: University of Kiel

Academic work
- Discipline: Philology
- Sub-discipline: Germanic philology
- Institutions: University of South Africa
- Main interests: Early Germanic religion and literature

Peter Buchholz (born 1941) is a South African philologist who is Professor Emeritus at the University of South Africa. He specializes in Germanic studies.

== Biography ==
Peter Buchholz was born in Pretoria, South Africa in 1941. He gained his habilitation in Germanic Philology at the University of Kiel in 1977. Buchholz has taught at the universities of Saarland, Kiel, Berkeley, and Sorbonne. In 1981, Bucholz was appointed Professor at the Department of Modern European Languages at the University of South Africa. He retired as Professor Emeritus in 2003. Bucholz has published a large number of scholarly works on Old Norse religion and literature.

== See also ==
- Jan de Vries
- Otto Höfler
- Edgar C. Polomé
- Georges Dumézil
- Gabriel Turville-Petre
- Rudolf Simek
- John Lindow
- Hilda Ellis Davidson

== Selected works ==
- Möglichkeiten und Grenzen einer germanischen Religionsgeschichte, 1966
- Bibliographie zur alteuropäischen Religionsgeschichte, 1954-1964
- Literatur zu den antiken Rand- und Nachfolgekulturen im außermediterranen Europa unter besonderer Berücksichtigung der nichtchristlichen Religionen, 1967
- Schamanistische Züge in der altisländischen Überlieferung, 1968
- A Bibliographical Introduction to Mediaeval Scandinavia, 1972
- Vorzeitkunde. Mündliches Erzählen und Überliefern im mittelalterlichen Skandinavien nach dem Zeugnis von Fornaldarsaga und eddischer Dichtung, 1980

== Sources ==
- "Peter Buchholz, Prof. Dr". German Academic Exchange Service (in German).
- Klaniczay, Gäbor; Pócs, Éva, eds. (2005). "Peter Buchholz". Communicating with the Spirits. Demons, Spirits, Witches. Vol. 1. Central European University Press. p. 264. ISBN 963-7326-13-8.
