= History of Pomerania (1945–present) =

History of Pomerania (1945–present) covers the history of Pomerania during World War II aftermath, the Communist and since 1989 Democratic era.

During this period, the bulk of Pomerania formed part of Poland, whereas most of Hither Pomerania formed part of East Germany, since 1990 in reunified Germany, merged with Mecklenburg into the state of Mecklenburg-Vorpommern, and a small portion of in the eastern part of the Vistula Spit around the abandoned village of Polski formed part of Russia.

With the consolidation of Communism in East Germany and People's Republic of Poland, Pomerania became part of the communist Eastern Bloc. In the 1980s, the Solidarność movement in Poland that started in the city of Gdańsk and the Wende movement in East Germany forced the Communists out of power and led to the establishment of democracy in both the Polish and German parts of Pomerania.

The name Pomerania comes from Slavic po more, which means "land by the sea".

== Post World War II ==
=== Soviet occupation ===
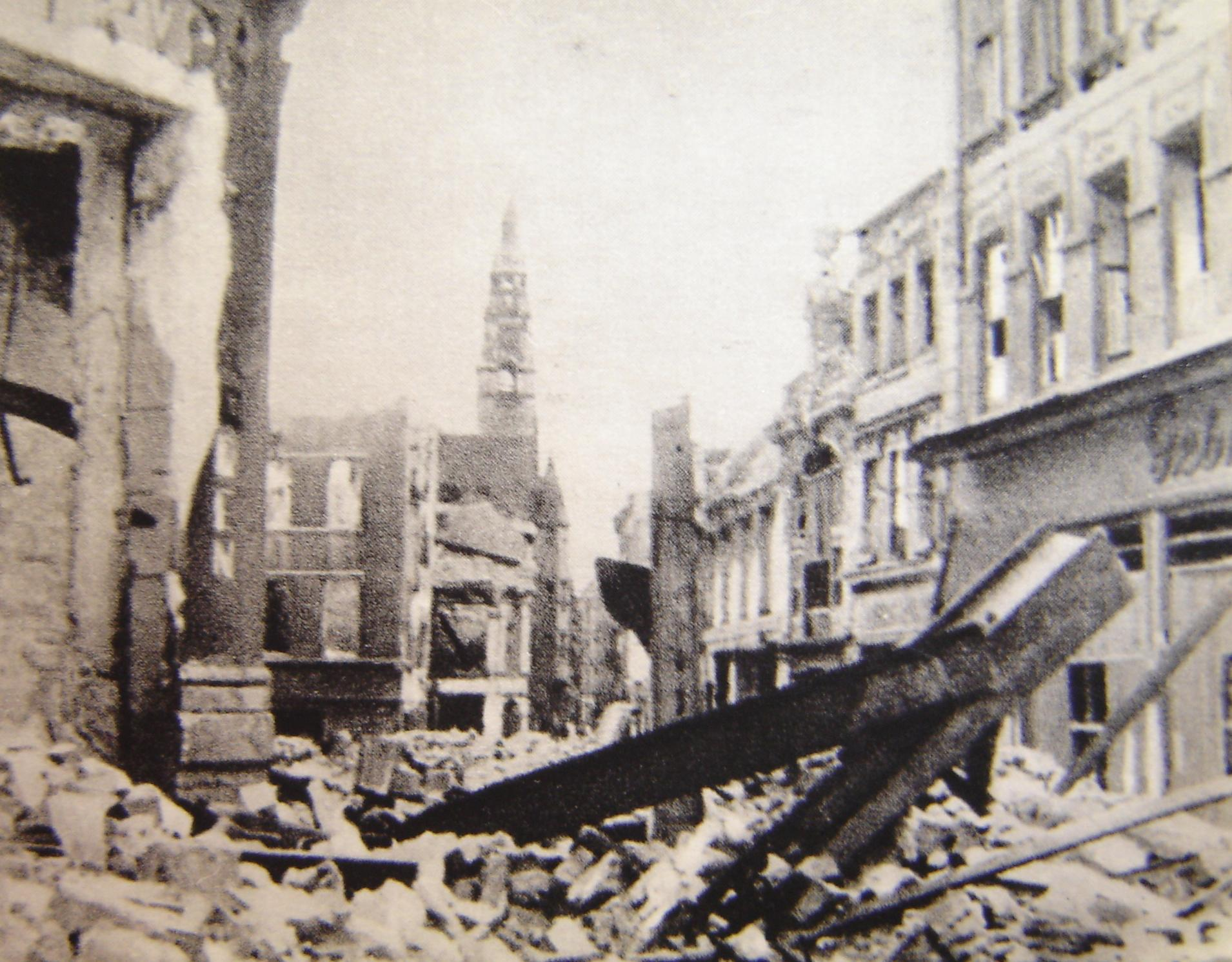
Szczecin in 1945

Soviet occupation of Pomerania had started just after the East Pomeranian Offensive, at the time of the northern campaigns of the Battle of Berlin by the Red Army and First Polish Army, in March and April 1945.

The Soviet's administrative installation basically followed the existing previous German administrative structures. Every-day life, however, was dictated according to Soviet decrees. Outside of civilian administration, this newly assembled local Soviet administration aimed to secure the hinterland regions, just beyond the frontline. In so doing, German property was referred to as "post-German". Items that could be carried were transported to the Soviet Union. This included largely domestic household furniture, instruments such as pianos, and textiles such as carpets. In some instances, the livestock and some machinery were sent to Russia as well. Most significantly, the industrial and manufacturing buildings and their shipyards were literally all deconstructed. Likewise, they too were simply transported to the Soviet Union.

Vast areas of Farther Pomerania were vacated as the ethnic German population had fled the advancing Red Army. This was primarily the case with the areas around the Noteć and Oder rivers. For example, in the town of Arnswalde (now Choszczno) with a previous population of 14,000 only a few dozen German civilians remained. In other areas, a heterogeneous population remained, consisting of Pomeranians as well as stranded refugees from areas further east and evacuees from the industrial centers. For example, there were 330,000 Germans in the counties of Stolp (Słupsk), Schlawe (Sławno), Köslin (Koszalin), and Belgard (Białogard).

The ethnic German population was ordered to participate in the acquisition and transportation of Soviet war loot, and to live in assigned to them neighbourhoods of the towns. Some were also employed by the Soviet authorities in industry or its deconstruction, in agriculture, and in the clean-up of the wartime destruction, and were paid a low salary.

There were numerous examples of mistreatment of the ethnic German populations by the occupying Soviets including: manhunts, arrests and deportations for slave labor, holdups, forays, and often rapes.

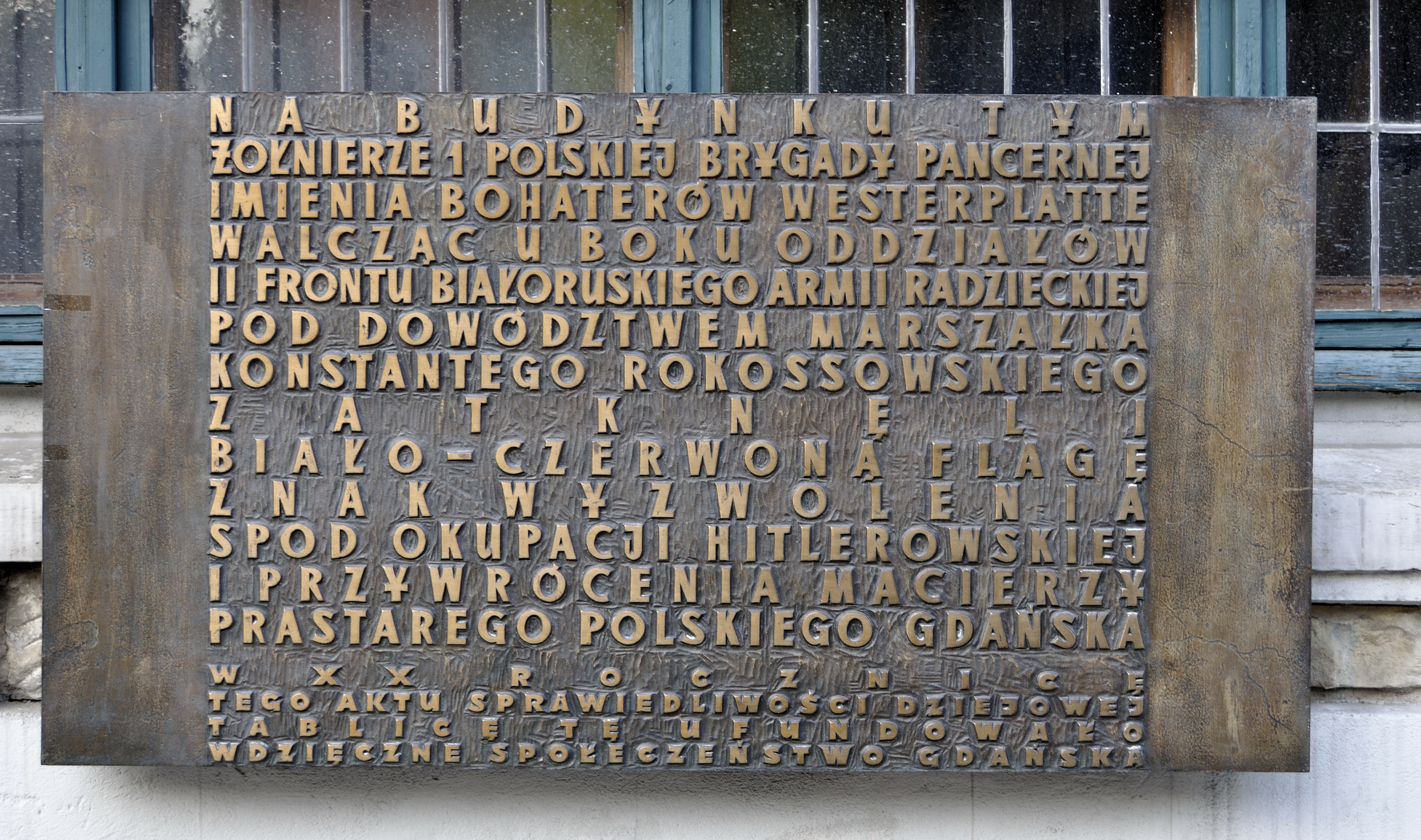
Plaque commemorating the return of Gdańsk to Poland

=== Formation of Polish communist administration in Farther Pomerania ===
First Polish communist officials arrived in Farther Pomerania in April 1945. The provisional government of Poland on March 14 had created the Polish administrative district of Pomerania, which included Farther Pomerania and the northern Neumark. This was based on a decision of the Soviet state council for defense in February to place some eastern territories of Germany under Polish administration, and a subsequent order of the military council of the First Belorussian Front in early March requiring a solely Polish civilian administration in the territories that were handed over and also required the Soviet military to assist in the Polish administration's establishment.

The Polish plenipotentiary for the new Pomeranian district since April 11 was colonel Leonard Borkowicz. Borkowicz and the starosts had a very limited knowledge of the area they were to govern, and were sent in only with an official attestation of their position, sketches of the counties, 500 zlotys, and alcohol to use as valuta. Their primary objective was the preparation of the area for Polish settlement. Subordinate to Borkowicz were forty county assignees (starosts).

The Polish officials were regarded no more than auxiliary personnel by the Soviet military administration, which was in charge of most of industry, bakeries, most of the farmland, and fishery. The Polish administrators concentrated on reinstating electricity, gas, and water supply and on stockpiling groceries for the expected Polish settlers. Conflicts arose when they tried to charge the Soviets for power, gas, or water.< Also they failed to have the Soviet authorities inhibit the forays of Red Army soldiers and officers. Overall Soviet attitude toward the Polish administrators ranged from providing aid to neglect.

=== Deportations of Germans before the Potsdam Agreement ===
In two weeks of June 1945, the Polish Army under the Soviet command deported 110,000 ethnic Germans from the areas adjacent to the eastern bank of the Oder river, and the counties of Stargard, Łobez, Pyrzyce, and Choszczno, all in Farther Pomerania.

Many German civilians were deported to labor camps like Vorkuta in the Soviet Union, where a large number of them perished or were later reported missing.

== Border shift and consequences ==
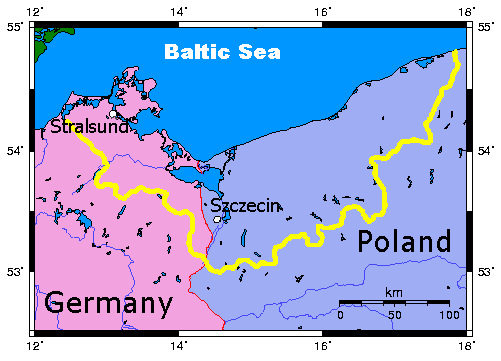
Pre-war Province of Pomerania (yellow) superimposed on post-war Germany (red) and Poland (blue)

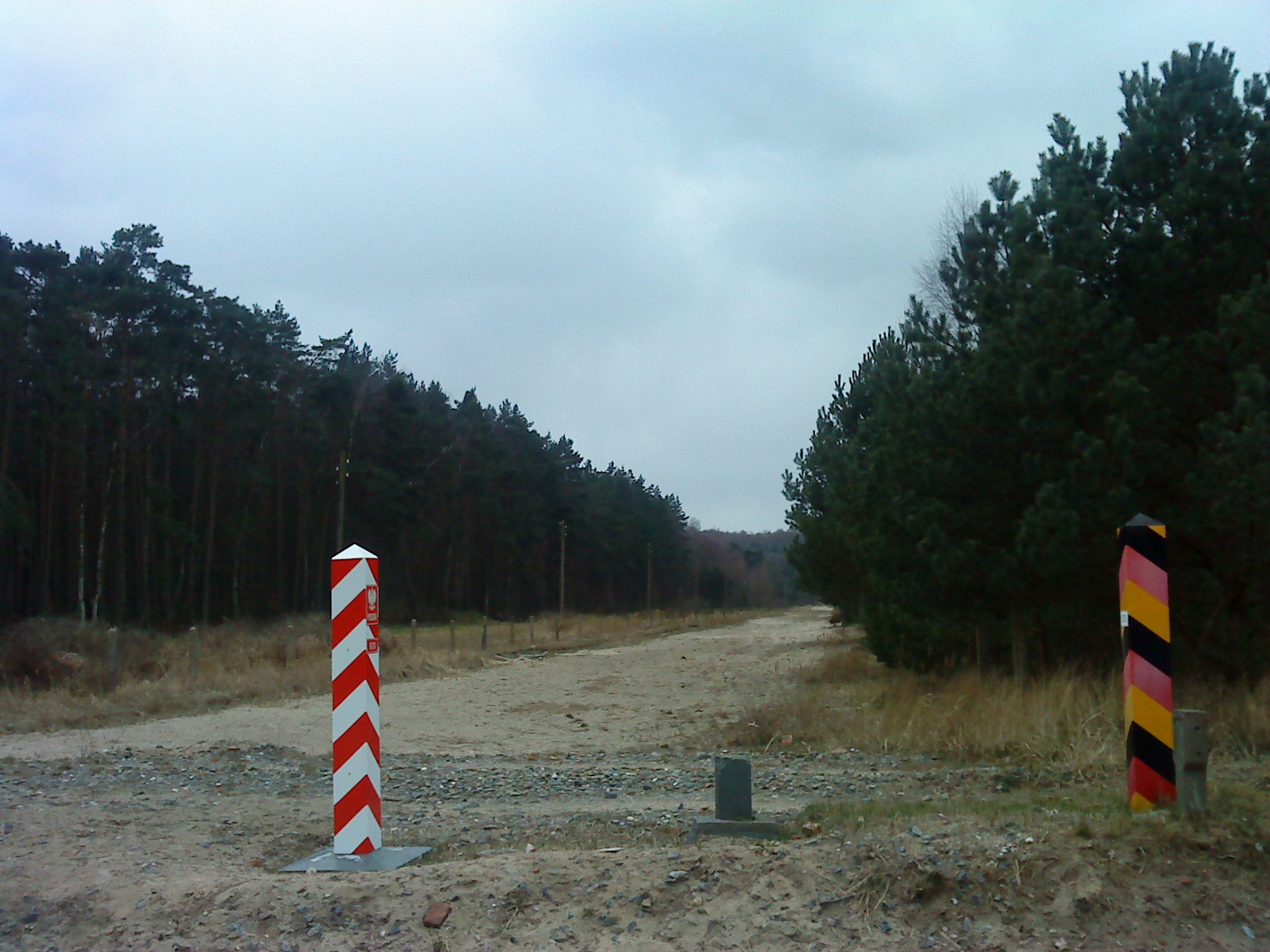
Oder-Neisse line, Usedom

In the Potsdam Agreement, the allies decided to move the Polish-German border west to the Oder-Neisse line, pending a final peace conference with Germany. Since a peace conference never took place, the provisions of the Agreement effectively defined the new border. Most of the remaining German population was expelled. In case of Pomerania, the entire pre-war Polish part of Pomerania remained part of Poland, and the Free City of Danzig and most of the pre-war German province of Pomerania, including the city of Swinemünde (Świnoujście), also became part of Poland, and a small portion of Gdańsk Pomerania in the eastern part of the Vistula Spit around the abandoned village of Polski passed to the Soviet Union, now part of Russia. In addition, a strip of land 20 km west of Szczecin, and a small part of the Usedom island also became part of Poland in order to facilitate the growth of these cities. The remainder of Pomerania west of Szczecin and the Oder River was joined with Mecklenburg and formed Mecklenburg-Vorpommern.

In Potsdam, the border was defined as leaving the Oder river at a bridge some three kilometers west of Gryfino and from that point running north as a straight line to the church of Ahlbeck. On September 21, 1945, the Polish plenipotentiary Borkowicz and the Polish president of Szczecin, Piotr Zaremba, adjusted the border in the Treaty of Schwerin. The border now started at a point in the Bay of Pomerania 3 miles (5.5 kilometers) off the shore, from which it ran south through the Szczecin Lagoon and left Camminke on the East German and Papart on the Polish side.

In January 1951, the border was again adjusted. The potable water reservoir of Świnoujście, which was on the German side since the Treaty of Schwerin, and the islands of the Oder River were assigned to Poland, and a small part of Usedom to East Germany. Also, the border within the Pomeranian Bay was extended to 6 miles.

=== Polish part of Pomerania - Szczecin Voivodship ===
The Soviet Army kept proving grounds and naval bases in Pomerania; the areas were excluded from Polish jurisdiction until 1992. Russia used the area to store nuclear warheads.

In the summer of 1945, the Soviets started to dissolve their administrative institutions in Pomerania. In 14 towns, the civilian administration was handed over to Polish officials.

In October, the counties of Stettin and Swinemünde were handed over to Polish administration. The areas on the Oder's left bank (Police area) stayed under Soviet control until 1946. There, a provisional Soviet county was set up on order of marshal Zhukov, where 25,000 Germans had to completely deconstruct an industrial facility used to produce synthetic fuels. Also the Szczecin port stayed directly under Soviet control, and was only handed over to Poland from February 1946 to September 1947, officially only in May 1954. The Oder waterway was handed over to Poland in September 1946. Farmland and estates were handed over until 1949 - in February 1946, half of the farmland was still Soviet property.

The Red Army started to increase the withdrawal of troops from the Polish part of Pomerania in the fall of 1945.

==== Polonization ====
With its eastern territories (the Kresy) annexed by the Soviet Union, Poland was effectively moved westwards and its area reduced by almost 20% (from 389,000 km^{2} to 312,000 km^{2}). With the establishment of the People's Republic of Poland followed sweeping changes in population, a "repatriation" of millions that resulted in what Geoffrey Hosking describes as "the biggest population exchange in European history." Germans, Ukrainians and others who were not perceived as Polish were shuffled out of the new boundaries, while the Poles east of the Curzon line were shuffled in. The picture of the new western and northern territories being recovered Piast territory was used to forge Polish settlers and "repatriates" arriving there into a coherent community loyal to the new regime.

Largely excepted from the expulsions of Germans were the "autochthons", close to three million ethnically Slavic inhabitants of Pomerania, the Kashubians and Slovincians, of whom however many did not identify with Polish nationality. The Polish government aimed to retain as many "autochthons" as possible for propaganda purposes, as their presence on former German soil was used to indicate the intrinsic "Polishness" of the area and justify its incorporation into the Polish state as "recovered" territories. "Verification" and "national rehabilitation" processes were set up to reveal a "dormant Polishness" and to determine which were redeemable as Polish citizens; few were actually expelled The "autochthons" not only disliked the subjective and often arbitrary verification process, but they also faced discrimination even after completing it, such as the Polonization of their names.

===== Treatment and expulsion of Germans after the Potsdam Agreement =====
The remaining Germans were to be expelled from the now Polish areas of Pomerania. The major staging area from which the Germans were deployed to post-war Germany was the Stettin-Scheune railway station. The station became notorious due to the frequent raids by armed gangs, composed of German, Polish and Russian deserters, who raped and looted those who were leaving. Germans were either transported by ship from Stettin to Lübeck or sent in trains to the British occupation zone.

In one month-long period, lasting from November 20 to December 21, 1945, 290,000 Germans were expelled; a subsequent, lengthier movement from February 1946 to October 1947 saw the expulsion of 760,000 more. Germans deported in the latter period, which has been named "Jaskolka" (swallow), were prioritized in five groups according to the risks they were perceived to represent or the value they offered, with those termed "obstructive" the first to go.

According to Piskorski, expellees were often not even allowed to carry household articles with them, and the few items they managed to take along were often robbed on the way. Piskorski notes that the Germans who were not yet expelled were legally "considered troublesome foreigners, temporarily residing in Poland" and were both disallowed communication devices like telephones or radios and restricted in their movements.

According to Werner Buchholz, during the Soviet capture of Farther Pomerania and the subsequent expulsions of Germans until 1950, 498,000 people from the part of the province east of the Oder-Neisse line died, making up for 26,4% of the former population. Of the 498,000 dead, 375,000 were civilians, and 123,000 were Wehrmacht soldiers. Low estimates give a million expellees from the then Polish part of the province in 1945 and the following years. Only 7,100 km2 remained with East Germany, about a fourth of the province's size before 1938 and a fifth of the size thereafter.

In 1949, the refugees from West Prussia and the Province of Pomerania established the non-profit Landsmannschaft Westpreußen and Landsmannschaft Pommern, respectively, to represent West Prussians and Pomeranians in the Federal Republic of Germany.

===== Removal of German population and heritage =====
The Recovered Territories after the assignment to Poland still hosted a substantial ethnic German population. This had to be changed quickly, as the territories' legal status was uncertain at the end of the war, and left room for different interpretations even after the Potsdam Agreement. The Polish administration set up a "Ministry for the Recovered Territories", headed by communist prime minister Władysław Gomułka. A "Bureau for Repatriation" was to supervise and organize the expulsions and resettlements.

The expulsion of the remaining Germans in the first post-war years presaged a broader campaign to remove the footprints of centuries of German history and culture. All German place names were replaced with historical Polish or Polonized medieval Slavic ones. If no Slavic name existed, then either the German name was translated or Polish assigned. The German language was banned, and many German monuments, graveyards, buildings etc. were demolished. Objects of art were moved to other parts of the country. Since Poles were predominantly Roman Catholic most Protestant churches were converted into Catholic ones. Official communist propaganda spread all-round anti-German sentiment, which was shared by many of the opposition as well as many in the Catholic Church.

A Polish law of May 1945 declared German property "abandoned". Only a decision of March 1946 declared it "state property" and prohibited further removal by the public. Many institutions in Central Poland ordered art, furniture, machines, bureau equipment, cars and construction material from the regional authorities. Over years, bricks were sent to Warsaw.

===== Resettlement =====
People from all over Poland moved in to replace the former German population in a process parallel to the expulsions. The settlers can be grouped according to their background:

- settlers from Central Poland moving voluntarily (the majority) more than half a million in 1950.
- Poles that had been freed from forced labor in Nazi Germany and Poles from other European countries, about 47,000 people.
- so-called "repatriants": Poles expelled from the areas east of the new Polish-Soviet border were preferably settled in the new western territories, where they made up 26% of the population (up to two million)
- non-Poles forcibly resettled during Operation Vistula in 1947. Large numbers of Ukrainians were forced to move from south-eastern Poland under a 1947 Polish government operation aimed at dispersing, and therefore assimilating, those Ukrainians who had not been expelled eastward already, throughout the newly acquired territories. Belarusians living around the area around Białystok were also pressured into relocating to Pomerania for the same reasons. This scattering of members of non-Polish ethnic groups throughout the country was an attempt by the Polish authorities to dissolve the unique ethnic identity of groups like the Ukrainians, Belarusians and Lemkos, and broke the proximity and communication necessary for strong communities to form. 53,000 people were forced to settle in the Szczecin Voivodship in 1947.
- Jewish Holocaust-survivors, most of them "repatriates" from the East, creating Jewish cooperatives and institutions – the largest community was founded in Szczecin. About 30,000 Jews from the Soviet Union settled in the Szczecin Voivodship, but most emigrated soon after. Most had left Poland by 1968 due to communist governmental antisemitic campaign, with the first mass flight of Jews from Poland taking place as a consequence of postwar anti-Jewish violence culminating in the Kielce pogrom in 1946.
- Poles repatriated from Harbin, China
- since the 1950s, Greeks, Macedonians, and Romani people settled in the Szczecin Voivodship, with the Romani first sticking to their nomadic way of life.

Polish and Soviet newspapers and officials encouraged Poles to relocate to the west – "the land of opportunity". These new territories were described as a place where opulent villas abandoned by fleeing Germans. In fact, the areas were devastated by the war, most of the infrastructure largely destroyed, suffering high crime rates and looting by criminal gangs. It took years for civil order to be established.

The newly created society, first binational and multi-cultural, quickly became subject to homogenisation decreed by the state. This new Pomeranian society was tied to the Polish one, and failed to develop a local or regional identity.

===== Demography =====
In the fall of 1945, 230,000 Poles had settled in the Szczecin Voivodship, and more than 400,000 Germans remained.

In the spring of 1946, Polish and German population were about equal in number.

By the end of 1947, 900,000 Poles and 59,000 Germans lived in the Szczecin Voivodship.

=== German part of Pomerania ===
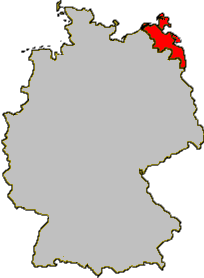
Western part of the former Province of Pomerania (Vorpommern, red) in modern Germany

In May 1945, the armies of the Soviet Union and the western allies met east of Schwerin. Following the Potsdam Agreement, the western allies handed over the western part of Mecklenburg to the Soviets. Mecklenburg-Vorpommern was established on July 9, 1945, per order Nr. 5 of Red Army marshal Zhukov, head of the Soviet administration (SMAD), as the Province of Mecklenburg and West Pomerania (sapadnoi Pomeranii).

The post-war period was characterized by the extreme difficulties arising from the need of housing and feeding the occupation forces as well as the refugees, while simultaneously state and private property was carried to the Soviet Union.

Furthermore, many of the towns had suffered severe war damages.

==== Demographic changes ====
During and after the war, the make-up of Mecklenburg and Vorpommern's population changed due to wartime losses and the influx of evacuees (mainly from the Berlin and Hamburg metropolitan areas that were subject to air raids) and people who fled and were expelled from the former eastern territories of Germany east of the Oder-Neisse line, which became the eastern border of Mecklenburg Vorpommern. After the war, the population had doubled with more than 40% of the population being refugees.

Before the war, Mecklenburg and Western Pomerania had a population of 1,278,700, of whom many perished during the war and another share moved west in the course of the Red Army's advance. In October 1945, the authorities counted 820,000 refugees in Mecklenburg-Vorpommern, of whom a number of 30,000 and 40,000 moved about without destination.

Before the war, the about 7,100 km^{2} of Vorpommern that would remain German were inhabited by about half a million people. After the war, 85,000 of these were either dead, had fled or were imprisoned. In 1946, the influx of 305,000 refugees raised the population to 719,000.

In 1946, the refugees in Vorpommern made up for 42,4% of the population. In the Stralsund and Grimmen counties, half of the population were refugees. The towns of Stralsund and Greifswald had the lowest rates of refugees.

More than half of the refugees in Vorpommern were expellees from the former eastern parts of the Province of Pomerania, the other ones were from any other former eastern territory. In 1947, some 1,426,000 refugees were counted in Mecklenburg-Vorpommern, 1 million of which was from post-war Poland. Most of them were settled in rural communities, but also the towns' population increased, most notably in Schwerin from 65,000 (1939) to 99,518 (January 1947), in Wismar from 29,463 to 44,173, and in Greifswald from 29,488 to 43,897.

In 1949, out of Mecklenburg-Vorpommern's population of 2,126,000, refugees accounted for 922,088. Yet, many people - both refugees and pre-war locals - moved towards the western allies' occupation zones, causing the number of inhabitants to decrease within the following decades.

==== Land reform ====
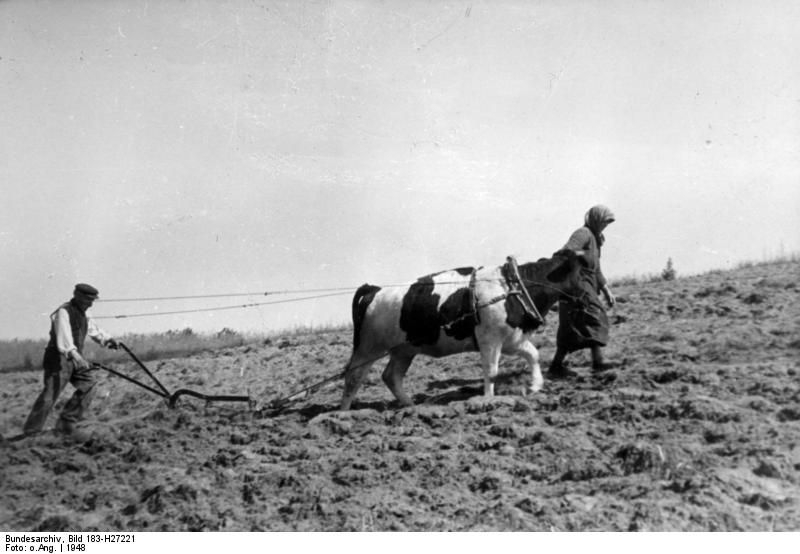
Peasant ploughing his newly assigned soil with an ox, 1948

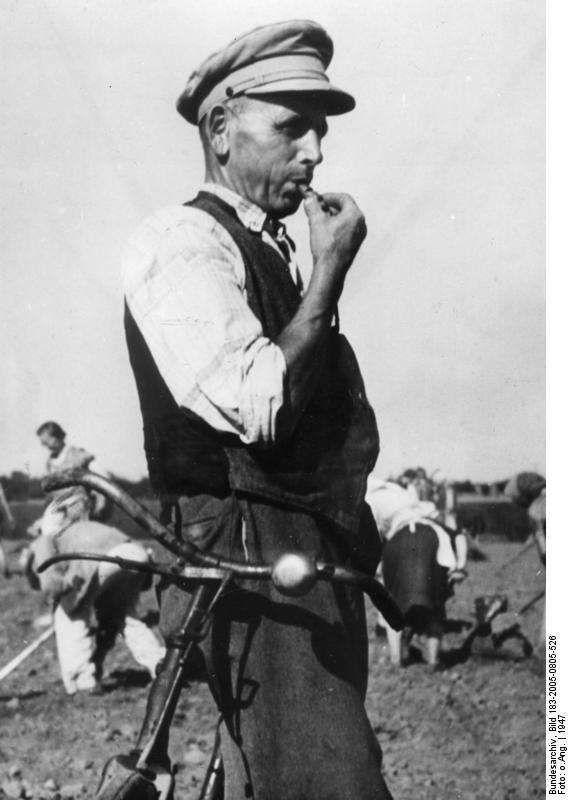
An official ("Feldwart", center) supervising foraging women on an already harvested field, 1947

Following the land reform of 1945/46, all farms larger than 100 ha were seized by the administration. Two thirds of the seized farms, making up for 54% of the overall seized farmland, were distributed among the refugees, who had become the majority in many rural communities. The remaining large farms not distributed among the population were run by the administration as so-called "People-owned farm" (Volkseigenes Gut, VEG).

After the reform, one out of two refugees was assigned to an own small farm.

The new partitions of land were usually of a size of five hectares.

==== Administration ====
On June 5, 1946, a law enacted by the Soviets led to the constitution of a provisional German administration (Beratende Versammlung) under Soviet supervision on June 29, 1946. After the unfree elections of October 20, 1946, a Landtag replaced the Beratende Versammlung and worked out the constitution of January 16, 1947, for the Land Mecklenburg-Vorpommern.

On March 1, 1947, the state's name was shortened to Land Mecklenburg following a Soviet order. Earlier attempts by local politicians like Otto Kortüm, mayor of Stralsund, to have the Pomeranian part of the new state organized in a separate administrative subdivision such as "Regierungsbezirk Stralsund, or to have a representative of the state's administration in Greifswald had all failed."

==== Parties ====
In April 1946, the social-democratic party (SPD) party was forced by the communists and the SMAD (Soviet administration) to merge with the communist party (KPD), resulting in the creation of the SED, which in the following years would act on Moscow's behalf.

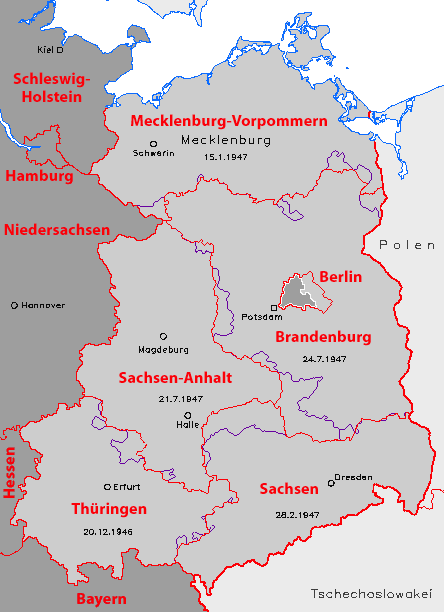
Mecklenburg-Vorpommern within East Germany, black: 1947 border, red: 1990 border

Mecklenburg-Vorpommern dissolved (northern districts Rostock, Schwerin, Neubrandenburg, 1947-1990

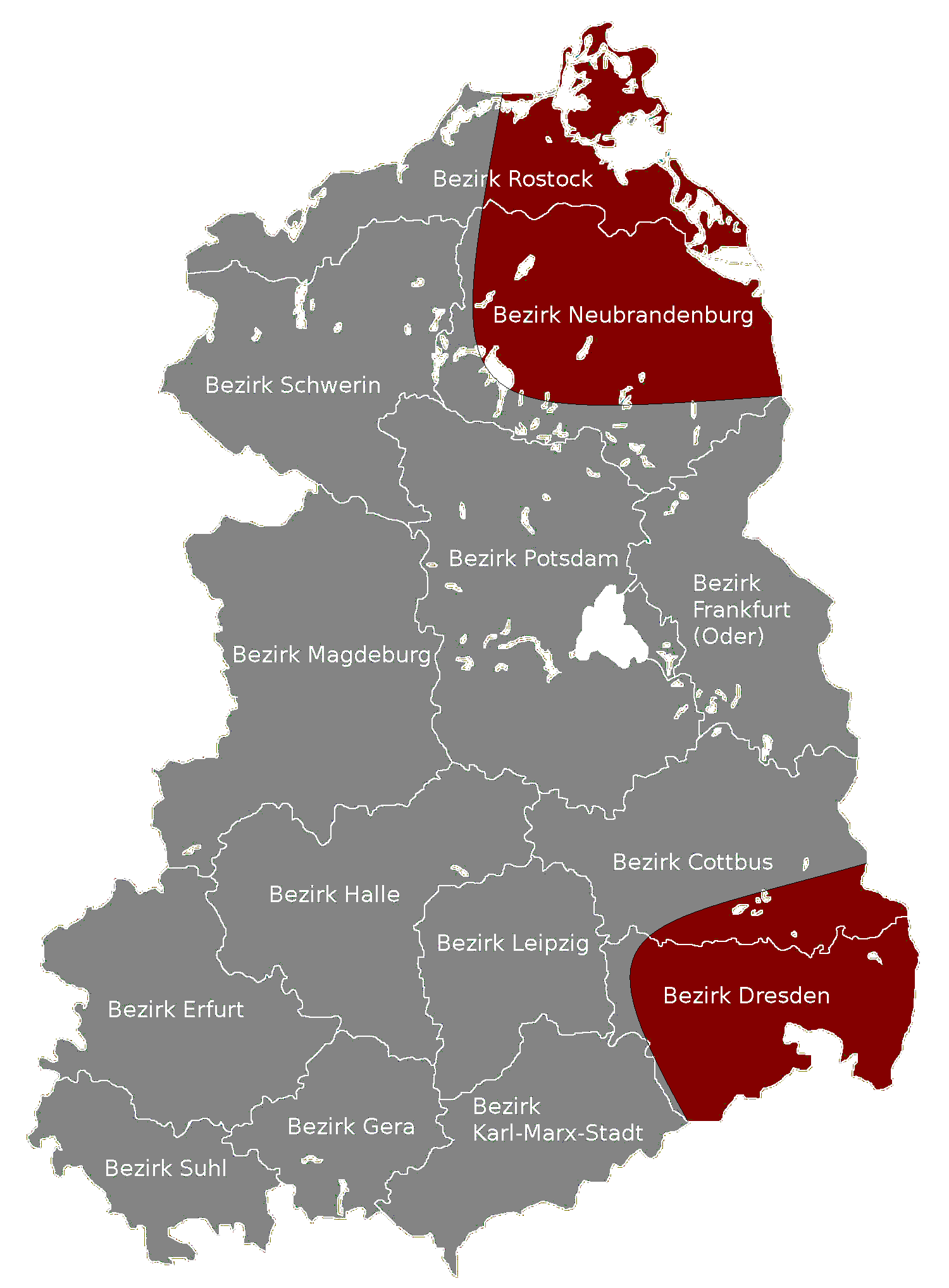
In most of German Pomerania, it was not possible to receive West German TV programs (red area), thus referred to as "Tal der Ahnungslosen" ("Valley of the Clueless")

== Communist era ==
=== Polish part of Pomerania ===
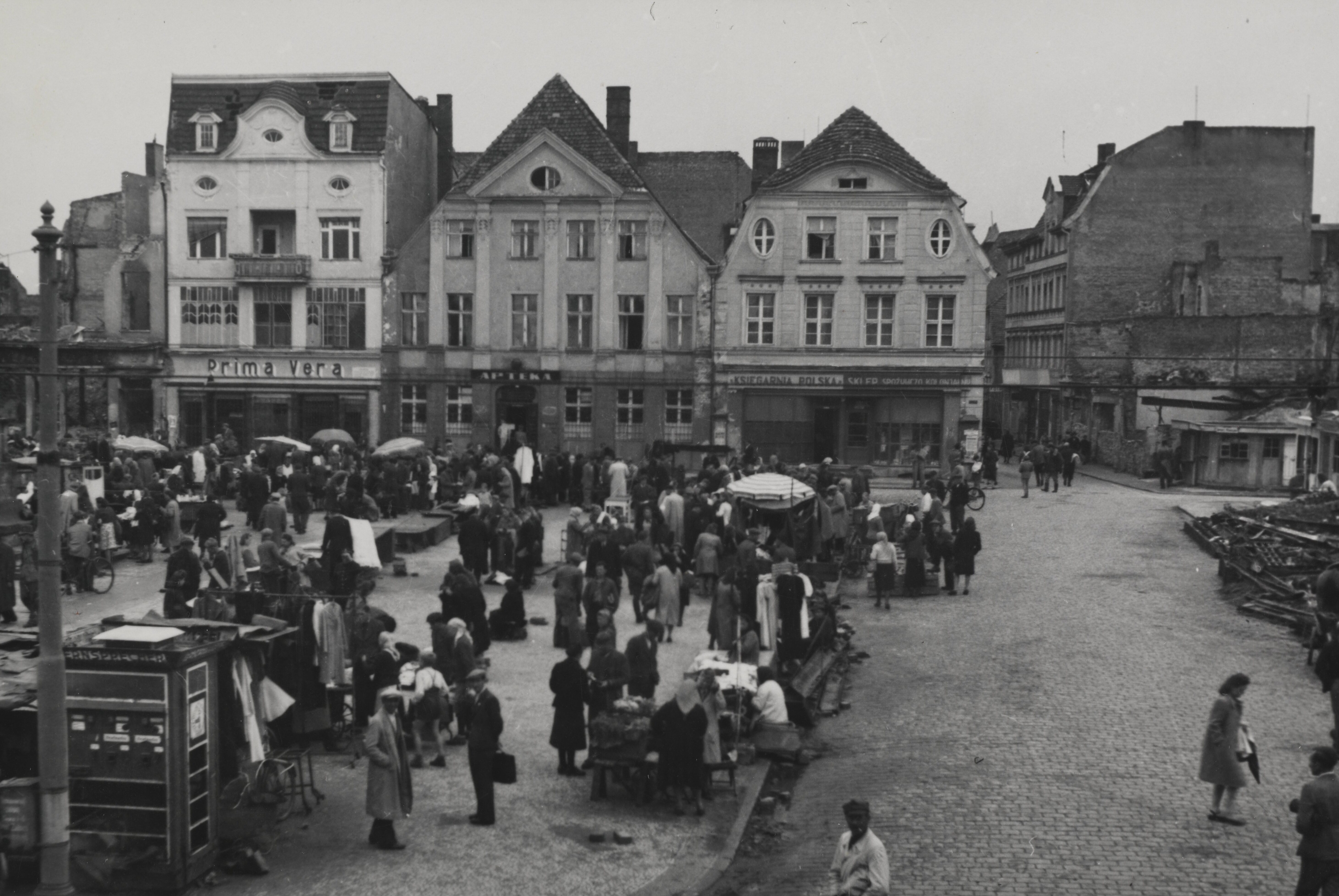
Słupsk, Poland, 1945

The situation changed for the worse in 1948, when all countries of the Eastern Bloc had to adopt Soviet economic principles. Private shops were banned and most farmers were forced to join agricultural cooperatives, managed by local communists.

In 1953 Poland was forced to accept the end of war reparations, which previously were solely placed on East Germany, while West Germany enjoyed the benefits of the Marshall Plan. In 1956 Poland was on the verge of a Soviet invasion, but the crisis was solved and the Polish government's communism developed a more human face with Władysław Gomułka as the head of politburo. Poland developed the ports of Pomerania and restored the destroyed shipyards of Gdańsk, Gdynia and Szczecin.

These were organised as two harbour complexes: one of Szczecin port with Swinoujscie avanport and the other was Gdańsk-Gdynia set of ports. Gdańsk and Gdynia, along with the spa of Sopot located between them, became one metropolitan area called Tricity and populated by more than 1,000,000 inhabitants.

Szczecin Shipyard workers' strike against the communist government authorities, 1980

In 1970, after putting an end to the uncertain border issue with West Germany under Willy Brandt, the massive unrest in the coastal cities marked the end of Władysław Gomułka's rule. The new leader, Edward Gierek, wanted to modernize the country by the wide use of western credits. Although the policy failed, Poland became one of the main world players in the shipyard industry. Polish open sea fishing scientists discovered new species of fish for the fishing industry. Unfortunately, countries with direct access to the open seas declared 200 mile (370 km) economic zones that finally put the end to the Polish fishing industry. Shipyards also came under growing pressure from the subsidized Japanese and Korean enterprises.

During 1970, Poland built also the Northern Harbour in rebuilt Gdańsk, which allowed the country independent access to oil from OPEC countries. The new oil refinery had been built in Gdańsk, and an oil pipeline connected both with main Polish pipeline in Płock.

The West Pomeranian Voivodeship's rural countryside from 1945 until 1989 remained underdeveloped and often neglected, as the pre-1945 German structures of Prussian-style nobility leading and steering agricultural cultivation had been destroyed by expulsion and communism.

==== Reorganisation of Catholic Church in Polish Pomerania ====
According to the Prussian Concordat of 1929 Pope Pius XI assigned all of then German Pomerania either to the new Catholic Diocese of Berlin (est. on 13 August 1930) or to the new Territorial Prelature of Schneidemühl (Piła), also comprising the Pomeranian districts of Bütow (Bytów) and Lauenburg in Pommern (Lębork). Diocese and prelature became part of the new East German Ecclesiastical Province as suffragans of the prior exempt Diocese of Breslau (Wrocław) simultaneously elevated to archdiocese.

After World War II, Berlin's diocesan territory east of the Oder-Neiße line (East Brandenburg and central and Farther Pomerania) – with 33 parishes and chapels of ease – came under Polish control. Most of the Catholic parishioners and priests there had either fled the invading Soviet Red Army or were subsequently expelled by Polish authorities.

Cardinal August Hlond demanded the diocesan territory east of the new border for the creation of new Catholic dioceses, he appointed a diocesan administrator for Berlin's eastern diocesan territory seated in Gorzów Wielkopolski. Pope Pius XII refused to acknowledge these claims. But most of the churches and ecclesiastical premises of the Pomerania ecclesiastical province of the Evangelical Church of the old-Prussian Union within now Polish Pomerania were taken by newly established Catholic congregations, since the Poles who had been transferred to the area via the Soviet demands of the Potsdam Agreement were predominantly Roman Catholic.

In 1951, when the Holy See - similar to West Germany - still asserted that Farther Pomerania would be returned to Germany at a near date, the Pope appointed Teodor Bensch (1903–1958), titular bishop of Tabuda, as auxiliary bishop responsible for the Polish part of the diocese of Berlin and the Prelature of Schneidemühl. His office was titled Apostolic Administration of Cammin, Lebus and the Prelature of Schneidemühl (Polish: Administracja Apostolska Kamieńska, Lubuska i Prałatury Pilskiej). This name referred to the prelature and Catholic bishoprics such as Cammin and Lebus, which existed prior the Protestant Reformation.

On 27 June 1972, however, - in response to West Germany's change in Ostpolitik and the Treaty of Warsaw - Pope Paul VI redrew the diocesan boundaries along the post-war political borders. The Apostolic constitution Episcoporum Poloniae coetus disentangled the Polish Pomeranian diocesan area of Berlin, becoming the new westerly Diocese of Szczecin-Kamień and the easterly Diocese of Koszalin-Kołobrzeg).

=== East German part of Pomerania ===
The part of Pomerania west of the Oder Neisse line was attached to Mecklenburg by a SMAD order of 1946 to form the Land of Mecklenburg-Vorpommern. This Land was renamed Mecklenburg in 1947, became a constituent state of the German Democratic Republic (East Germany) in 1949 and was dissolved by the GDR government in 1952, when the East Berlin government abandoned "states" in favour of districts (German: Bezirke). The area of Western Pomerania was split into the eastern Kreis districts of the newly established Bezirk administrative GDR subdivisions Bezirk Rostock and Bezirk Neubrandenburg, Gartz (Oder) joined Bezirk Frankfurt (Oder). The administrative changes also made the historical border between Mecklenburg and Pomerania vanish from the maps.

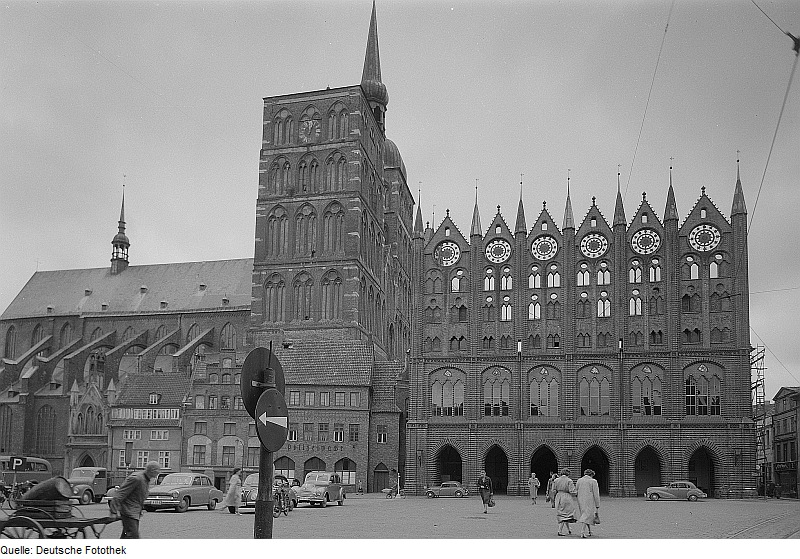
Stralsund, East Germany, 1963

The Pomeranian counties had already undergone changes in 1950: Randow county, recreated in 1945, was dissolved, the southern parts with Gartz (Oder) joined Brandenburg. Thus, Western Pomerania lost the last link with the Oder river, the historical eastern border. Ueckermünde county was renamed Pasewalk county and 22 Brandenburgian communities were merged in. The Pomeranian town Damgarten was fused with the Mecklenburgian town Ribnitz to Ribnitz-Damgarten, thus Western Pomerania's historical western border (Recknitz river, flowing between Ribnitz and Damgarten) vanished from the administrative maps.

In 1952, another county reform made other parts of the historical Mecklenburgian and Pomeranian frontier vanish from the maps. The name "Pomerania" was now only used by the Pomeranian Evangelical Church, which had to change this name in "Evangelical Church Greifswald" in 1968.

Throughout the 1950s, small farms including those created in the previous land reform were forced to group to Socialist-style LPG units. In 1986, 90 LPGs ran close to 90% of the farmland, in addition there were the state estates (VEG, "Volkseigenes Gut"). An LPG had an average size of 4,700, a VEG 5,000 hectares. Agriculture was characterized by huge fields up to a hundred hectares, the use of large machines and an industrial way to work. Fertilizer was in many cases applied by planes.

In Aktion Rose, private property of housing was turned over to the state. From this stock, various state organizations ran the GDR's seaside resort, serving 75% of the East German Baltic coast tourists.

The East German policy of industrialization led to the establishment of a nuclear power plant in Lubmin near Greifswald, the Stralsund Volkswerft shipyard, and the Sassnitz ferry terminal directly linking Western Pomerania to the Soviet Union via Klaipėda. The Volkswerft was the main industry of Western Pomerania with 8,000 employees. One third of the Soviet fish trawlers were built in Stralsund. Another shipyard set up during the Communist era was the Peenewerft in Wolgast, where East German navy ships were built. In Greifswald, industry constructing electronic supplies for the shipyards was settled, employing 4,000 people.

== Democratic era ==
=== Polish part of Pomerania ===
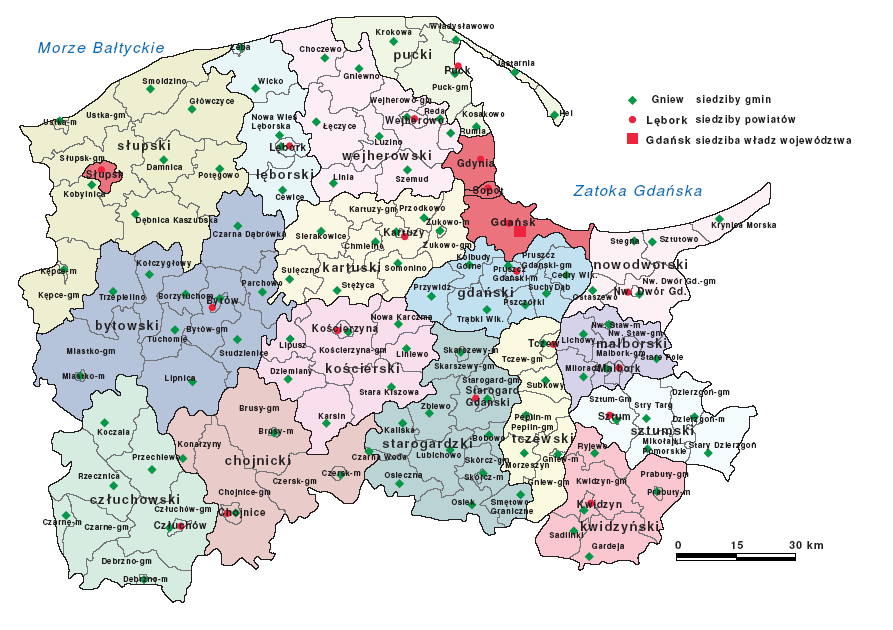
Pomeranian Voivodeship, established in 1999, comprising Eastern Pomerania and the right bank of the Vistula river

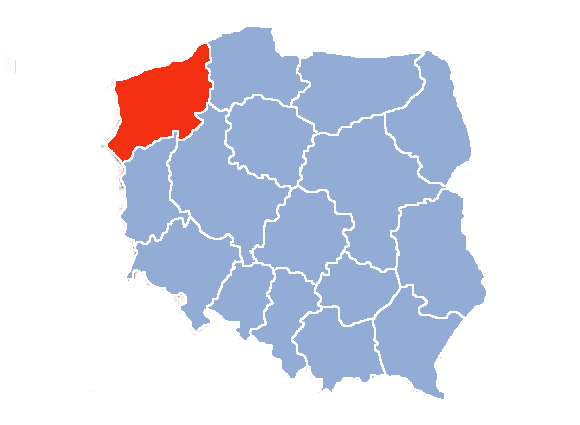
West Pomeranian Voivodeship, established in 1999, compromising most of pre-1945 German Province of Pomerania.

In 1980, Polish Pomeranian coastal cities played a leading role in the anti-communist movement. On 30 August 1980, first of the four August Agreements, which led to the first legalisation of the trade union Solidarity, was signed in Szczecin. Soon Gdańsk became the place of birth for Solidarity and the capital for the Solidarity trade union. In 1989 it was found that the border treaty with the Communist German Democratic Republic had one mistake, concerning the naval border. Subsequently, a new treaty was signed.

In recent history, Polish Pomerania co-hosted various major international sports competitions, including the EuroBasket 2009, 2011 FIVB Volleyball World League, UEFA Euro 2012, 2013 Men's European Volleyball Championship, 2014 FIVB Volleyball Men's World Championship, 2016 European Men's Handball Championship, 2017 Men's European Volleyball Championship, 2021 Men's European Volleyball Championship, 2022 FIVB Volleyball Women's World Championship, 2023 World Men's Handball Championship and 2023 FIVB Volleyball Men's Nations League.

=== German part of Pomerania ===
In October 1990, after the GDR regime was overthrown by the peaceful Wende revolution of 1989, Mecklenburg-Vorpommern was reconstituted and joined the Federal Republic of Germany, with Vorpommern being a constituent region of the Bundesland with a special status, but not an administrative one. Since then, the region suffers from a population drain as mostly young people migrate to the West due to high unemployment rates.

=== Pomerania euroregion ===
The Pomerania euroregion was set up in 1995 as one of the euroregions, thought to connect regions divided between states of the European Union. The name EUROREGION POMERANIA is taken from the region of Pomerania, yet the euroregion is of a different shape than the historical region. It comprises German Western Pomerania and Uckermark, Polish Zachodniopomorskie, and Scania in Sweden.

== Sources ==
- Werner Buchholz et al., Pommern, Siedler, 1999/2002, ISBN 3-88680-780-0, 576 pages; this book is part of the Deutsche Geschichte im Osten Europas series and primarily covers the history of the Duchy of Pomerania and Province of Pomerania from the 12th century to 1945, and Western Pomerania after 1945.
- Jan Maria Piskorski et al. (Werner Buchholz, Jörg Hackmann, Alina Hutnikiewicz, Norbert Kersken, Hans-Werner Rautenberg, Wlodzimierz Stepinski, Zygmunt Szultka, Bogdan Wachowiak, Edward Wlodarczyk), Pommern im Wandel der Zeiten, Zamek Ksiazat Pomorskich, 1999, ISBN 83-906184-8-6 OCLC 43087092. This book is a co-edition of several German and Polish experts on Pomeranian history and covers the history of Pomerania, except for Pomerelia, from the earliest appearance of humans in the area until the end of the second millennium. It is also available in a Polish version, ISBN 83-910291-0-7.
