= Sianów =

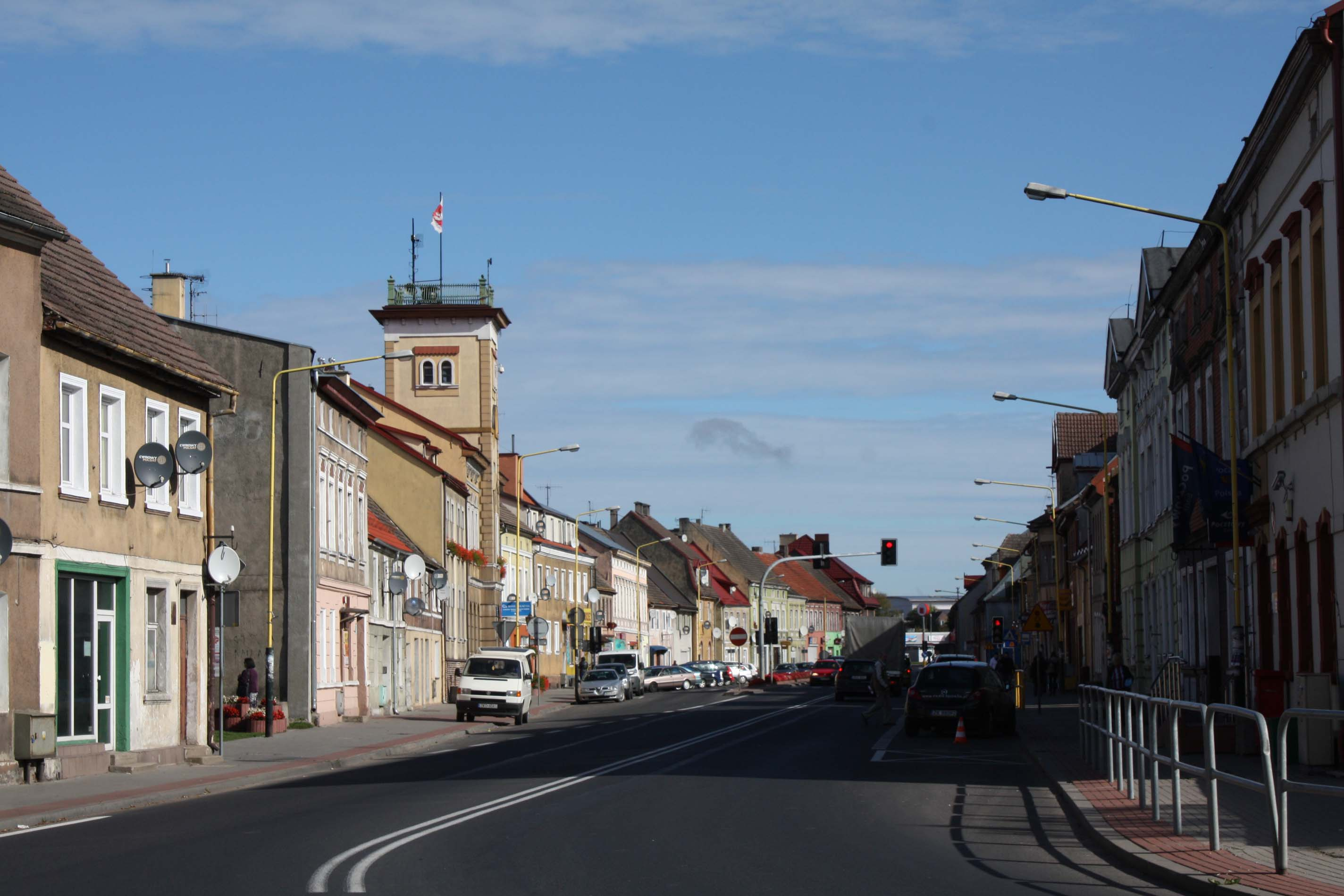
- Town center

- Flag Coat of arms

- Location within Poland
- Coordinates: 54°13′49″N 16°17′51″E
- Country: Poland
- Voivodeship: West Pomeranian
- County: Koszalin
- Gmina: Sianów
- Town rights: 1343

Area
  - Total: 15.93 km^{2} (6.15 sq mi)

Population (2010)
  - Total: 6,555
  - Density: 411.5/km^{2} (1,066/sq mi)
- Time zone: UTC+1 (CET)
  - Summer (DST): UTC+2 (CEST)
- Postal code: 76-004
- Vehicle registration: ZKO
- Website: http://www.sianow.pl

Sianów (Polish pronunciation: [ˈɕanuf]; German: Zanow) is a town in northern Poland, in West Pomeranian Voivodeship, in Koszalin County. It is the seat of Gmina Sianów. It has 6,555 inhabitants (2010).

Sianów is a member of Cittaslow.

== History ==
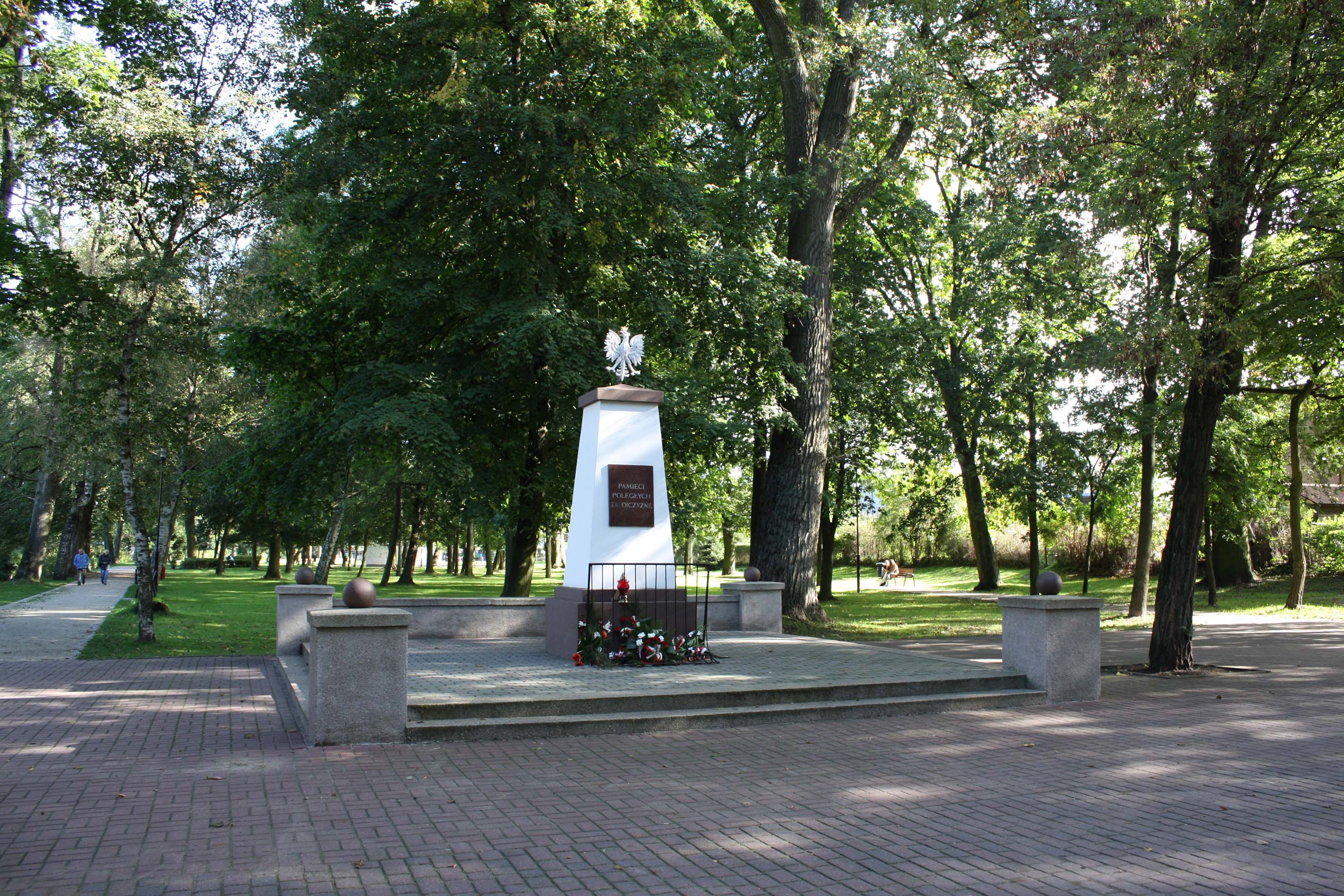
Memorial for the fallen for Poland at the Municipal Park

The territory became part of the emerging Polish state under its first ruler Mieszko I by c. 967. At various times, Sianów was part of the eastern and western duchies of Pomerania, formed as a result of the medieval fragmentation of Poland into smaller duchies. It was possibly a possession of the East Pomeranian Swienca family. It was granted town rights in 1343. In 1353, the town was possibly purchased by the Bishop of Kamień, however, the actual status is not known, as in 1372 it was noted as a ducal possession and in 1386 as a diocesan possession. In 1480, during his stay at the local castle, Duke Bogislaw X was attacked and captured by the rebellious townspeople from nearby Koszalin.

The town remained part of the district of Darłowo, from which it was separated in 1623 by Duke Boguslaw XIV. Following the annexation by Brandenburg, the town was in dispute with the regional administration over its administrative status as it was reintegrated into the Darłowo district, and deprived of its voting rights in regional assemblies and of its local judiciary. In 1743, Sianów purchased the lake between Sianów and Skibno. During the Napoleonic Wars, some 11,000 soldiers passed through the town, including of the Polish Legions. In 1833, some 100 former Polish insurgents built the road connecting Sianów and Koszalin, part of the longer road connecting Gdańsk and Szczecin. In 1877, a road connecting Sianów with the railway station in nearby Skibno was built. Four annual fairs were held in the town in the late 19th century.

During World War II, Nazi Germany operated a forced labour subcamp of the Stalag II-B prisoner-of-war camp in the town. In March 1945, liberated forced labourer August Turzyński became the mayor of Sianów.

== Transport ==
The S6 expressway bypasses Sianów to the north. Exit 26 of the S6 expressway allows for quick access to Koszalin and Sławno. Upon the opening of the S6 expressway in December 2025, national road 6 (which formerly ran through Sianów) was re-numbered as minor road 112. The nearest railway station to Sianów is Skibno (3km to the north-east).

== Demographics ==
Historical population

Year	Pop.	±%
1871	2,200	—
1880	2,517	+14.4%
1890	2,857	+13.5%
1900	2,763	−3.3%
1910	2,573	−6.9%

Year	Pop.	±%
1925	2,655	+3.2%
1939	3,050	+14.9%
1950	1,828	−40.1%
1960	3,422	+87.2%
2010	6,555	+91.6%

== Notable people ==
- Edward Żentara (1956–2011), Polish actor, appearing in more than 50 films and television shows between 1978 and 2010.
