= Andrzej Rzymkowski =

Polish architect and professor

Andrzej Maria Rzymkowski (born 21 June 1911 in Kraków, d. 30 June 1986 in Koszalin) was a Polish architect and professor at the Wrocław University of Science and Technology, Tadeusz Kościuszko University of Technology and the Koszalin University of Technology.

He was son of Jan and Ludwika née Zoerner. He had a sister - Maria.

Rzymkowski graduated in 1939 at the Lwów Polytechnic. In 1950 he became Doctor of Engineering at the Warsaw University of Technology.

== Publications ==
- Budynki dla zwierząt gospodarskich (1954, 2nd edition 1958, 3rd edition 1963)
- Planowanie i budownictwo osiedli wiejskich (1954, 2nd edition 1956)
- Planowanie przestrzenne w górach (1966, 2nd edition 1967)
- Ruralistyka. Planowanie obszarów rolniczych i budownictwo wiejskie (1972)
- Modernizacja budynków dla trzody chlewnej (1973)
- Takie sobie ziemskie sprawy. Człowiek i jego środowisko (1973)
- Planowanie i budownictwo osiedli wiejskich (1954, editor)
- Budynki dla zwierząt inwentarskich (1957, editor)
- Metody planistyczne dla określenia zasięgu kultur rolnych w terenach górskich (1964, editor)
- Nasze i wspólne (1975)
- Szkice z natury (1976)
- Konfrontacje koszalińskie (1979)
- Moje powroty (1981)
