= Berdnikov =

Berdnikov (Russian: Бердников) is a Russian masculine surname, its feminine counterpart is Berdnikova. It may refer to:

- Aleksei Berdnikov (born 1996), Russian football player
- Alexander Berdnikov (born 1953), Russian politician
- Roman Berdnikov (born 1974), Russian general
- Roman Berdnikov (born 1992), Russian ice hockey player
- Sergei Berdnikov (born 1971), Russian ice hockey left winger
- Vadim Berdnikov (born 1987), Russian ice hockey player
- Vladimir Berdnikov (born 1946), Russian painter and glass artist
