= Flag of Koszalin =

Polish municipal flag

Koszalin
- Proportion: 5:8
- Adopted: 10 February 1959

The flag, that serves as the symbol of the city of Koszalin, West Pomeranian Voivodeship, in north-western Poland, is divided horizontally into two equally-sized stripes, white on the top, and blue on the bottom. It was established in 1959.

== Design ==
The flag of the city of Koszalin is divided horizontally into two equally-sized stripes, white on the top, and blue on the bottom. The flag proportions have the aspect ratio of its height to its width equal 5:8.

== History ==
The flag was established by the City Council on 10 February 1959, making it one of the oldest city flags of Poland. Originally, the flag proportions were not specified, but later, they were set at 5:8.
