= Hans Richert =

German politician

Hans Richert (21 December 1869 – 25 September 1940) was a German school reformer, teacher, headmaster and philosopher.

== Life and achievements ==
Richert was born in Koszalin/Pommern. During his studies Richert became a member of the Verein Deutscher Studenten Greifswald. In 1920 he published the book "Die Deutsche Bildungseinheit und die höhere Schule", which was the basis of a Prussian school reform (Richertsche Gymnasialreform). On 18 September 1923 he was appointed Ministerialrat. In 1924/25 he played a decisive role in the reform of the secondary school system. His name is connected with the new "German Secondary School", which focused on the mother tongue instead of the old languages. The "cultural studies subjects" German, history, civics, religion and geography were considered by him to be common to all secondary schools. In 1933, disappointed by the Nazi cultural policy, he handed in his resignation. He was a member and leading politician for education of the German People's Party. From 1919 to 1921 he was a member of the Preußische Landesversammlung.

Richert died in Berlin at age 70.

== Publications ==
- Hegels Religionsphilosophie : in ihren Grundzügen dargestellt und beurteilt. Gruenauer, Bromberg 1900 (Digitized)
- Kant: Gedenkrede zu Kants 100jhg. Todestage am 19. Febr. 1904. Bromberg 1905.
- Philosophie. Eine Einführung in die Wissenschaft, ihr Wesen u. ihre Probleme. Leipzig 1908.
- Handbuch für den evangelischen Religionsunterricht erwachsener Schüler. 1911.
- Das deutsche Bildungsideal und die moderne Weltanschauung. Posen 1916.
- Psychologie und Pädagogik der Entwicklungsjahre. Berlin 1917.
- Die Stellung des Christentums im neuen Deutschland. Posen 1919.
- Schopenhauer. Seine Persönlichkeit, seine Lehre, seine Bedeutung. Leipzig 1920.
- Weltanschauung : Ein Führer für Suchende. Leipzig/Berlin 1922.
- Die Ober- und Aufbauschule. Leipzig 1923.
- Richtlinien für die Lehrpläne der höheren Schulen Preußens. Berlin 1927.
- Königliches Realgymnasium Zu Bromberg. Beilage Zum Jahresbericht Ostern 1900. Nachdruck 2010.
