= Koszalin =

- City county
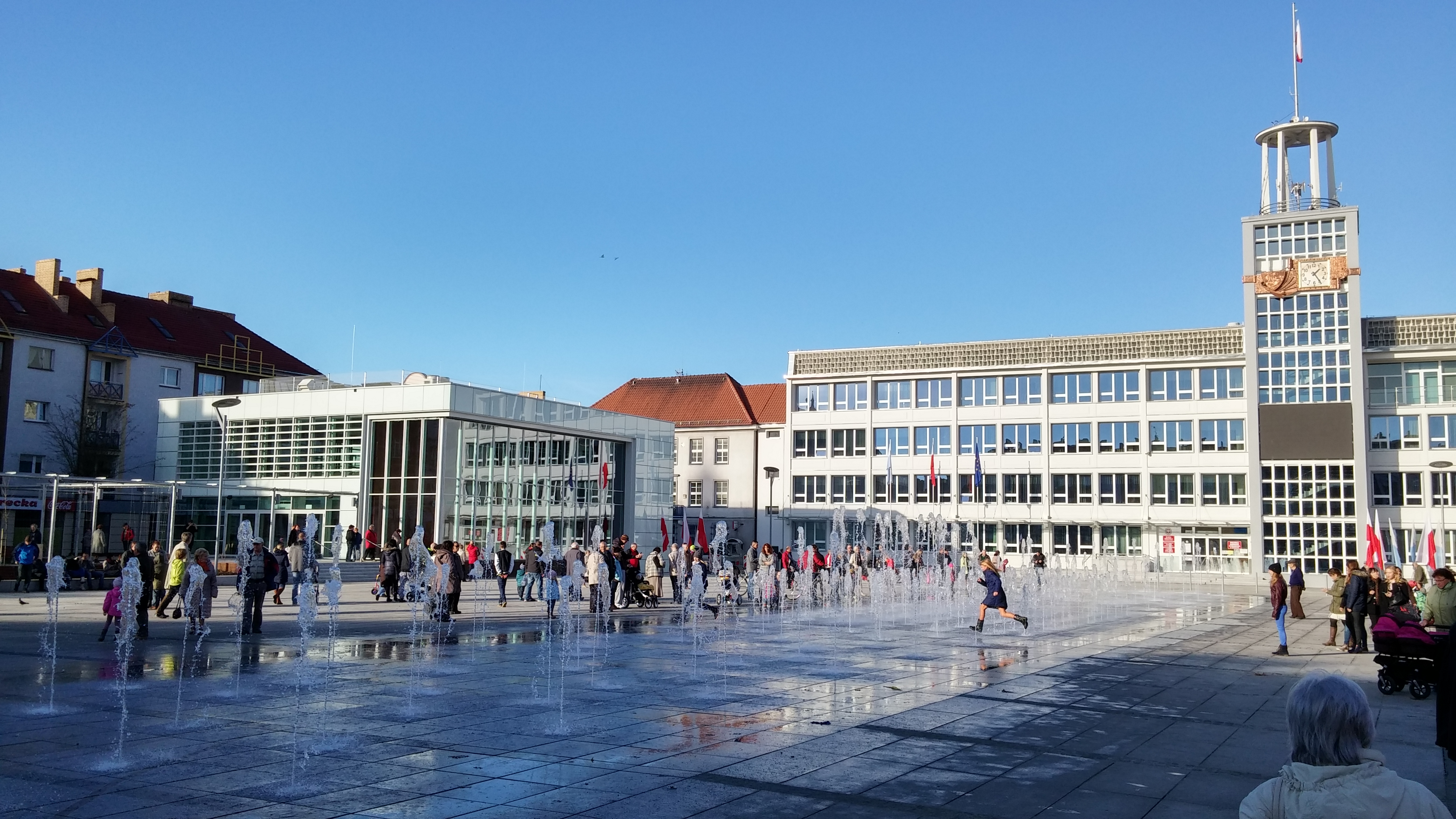
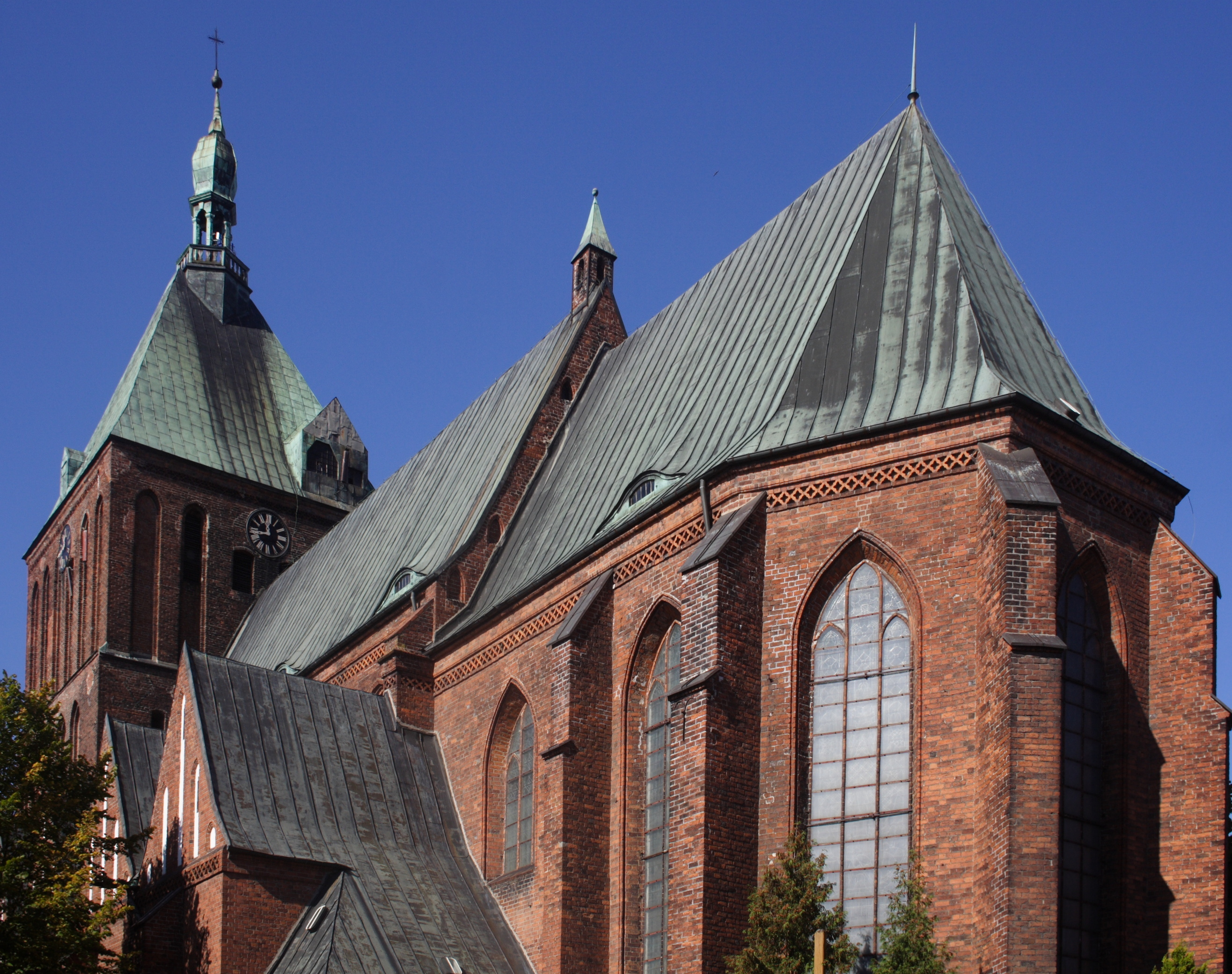
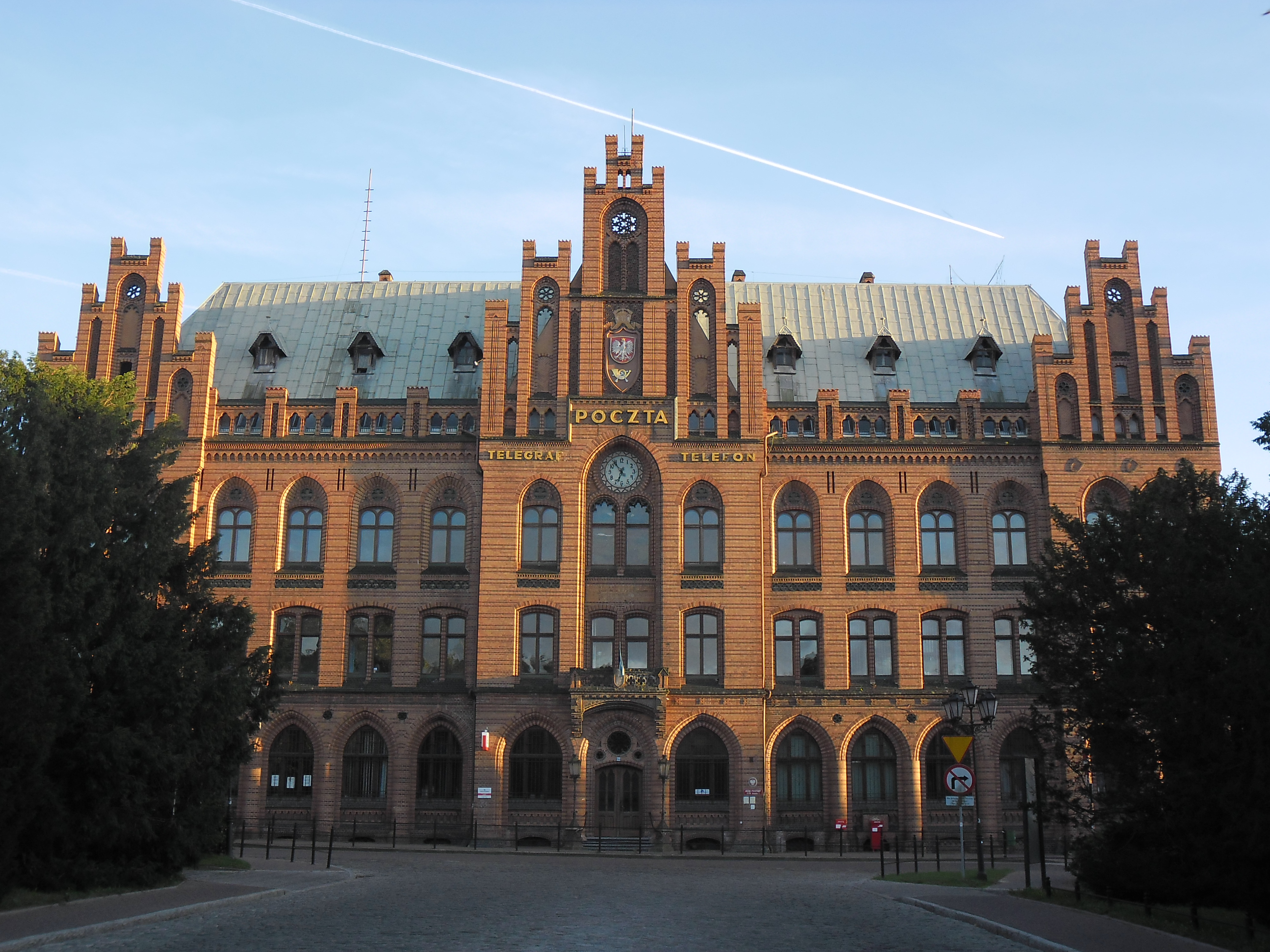
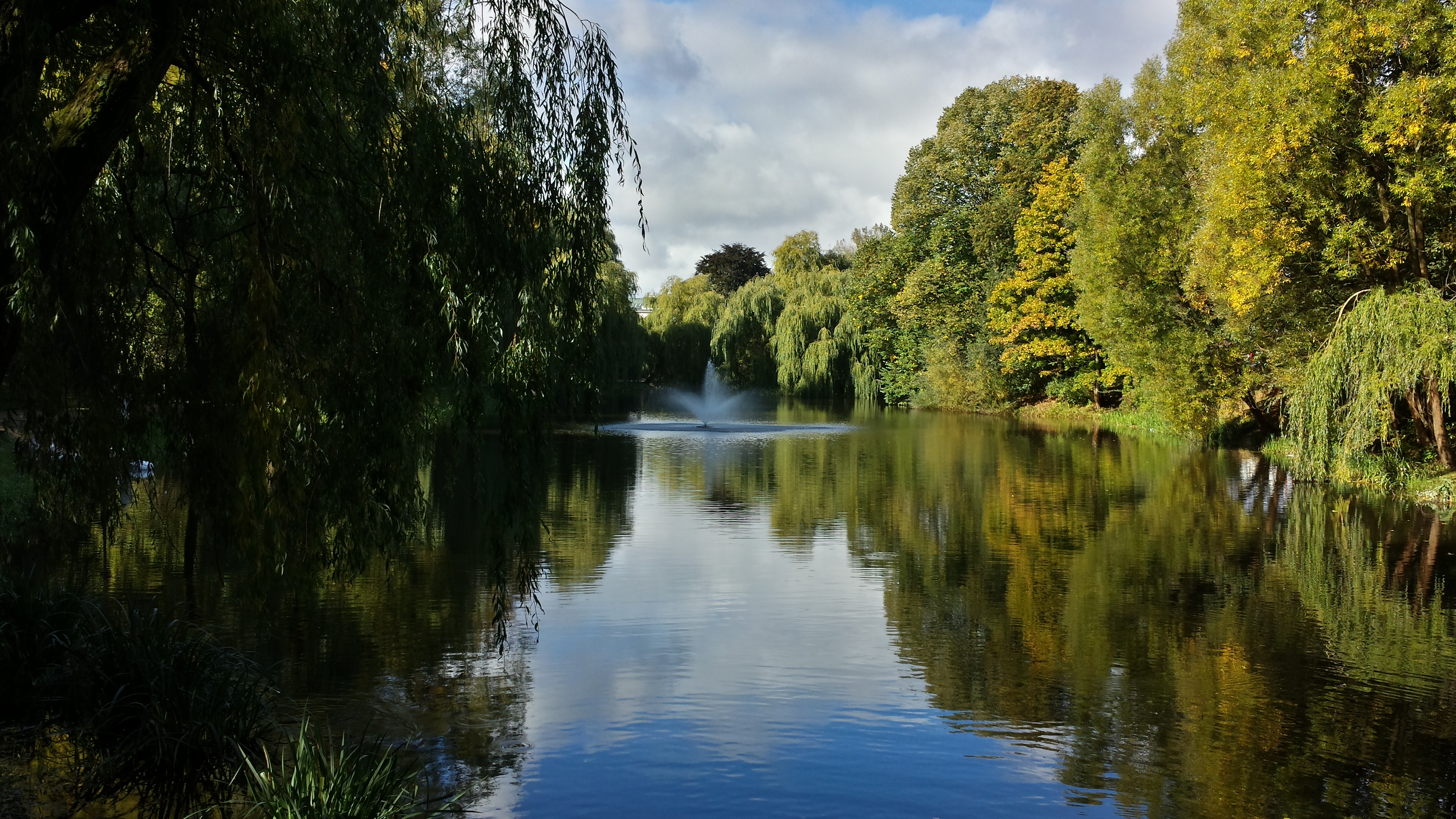
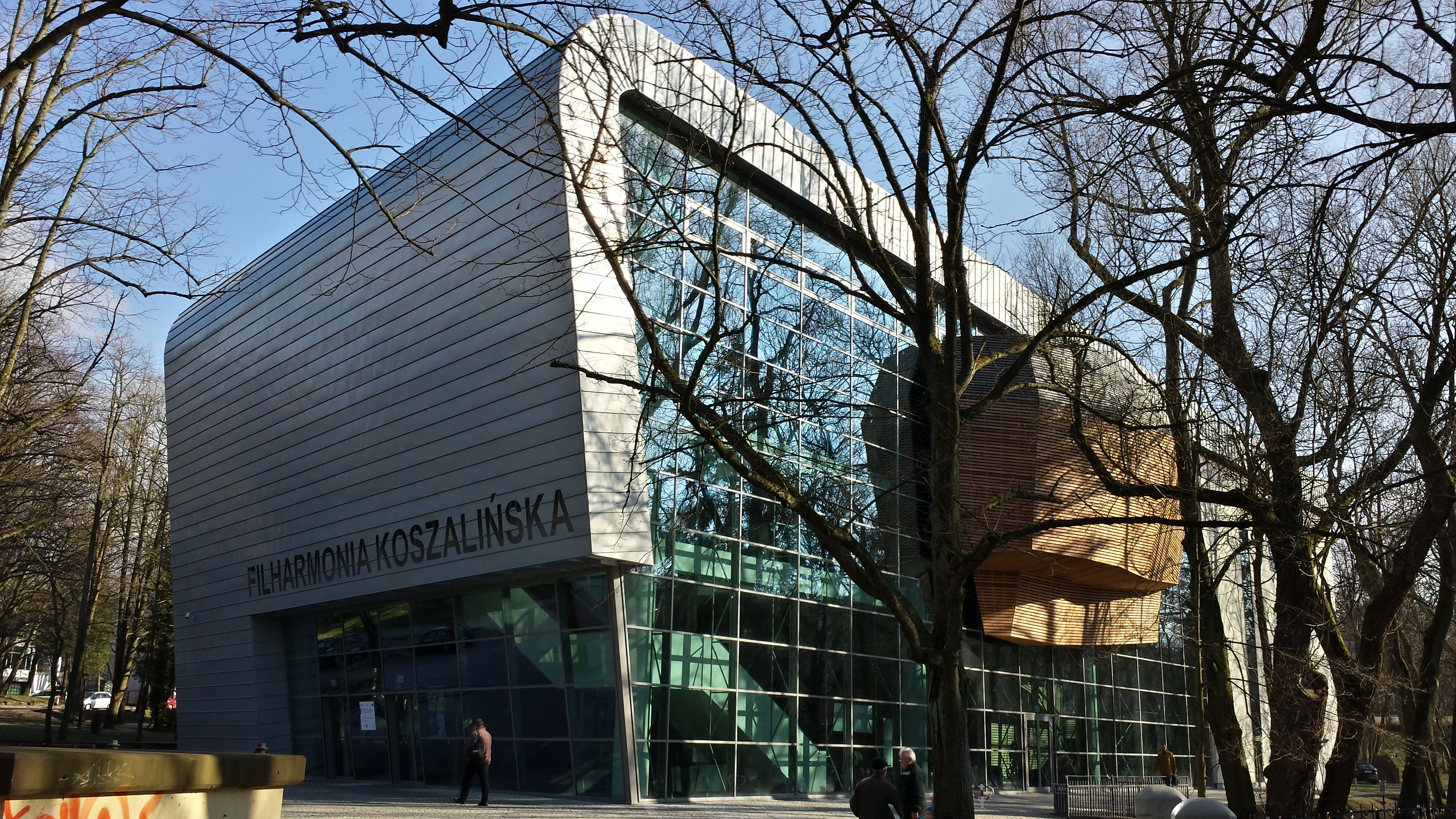
- Market Square Koszalin Cathedral Main Post Office Park of the Dukes of Pomerania Koszalin Philharmonic

- Flag Coat of arms
- Motto: Center of Pomerania (Polish: Centrum Pomorza)
- Location within Poland
- Coordinates: 54°11′28″N 16°10′38″E
- Country: Poland
- Voivodeship: (West Pomeranian Voivodeship) West Pomeranian
- County: city county
- Established: 11th century
- Town rights: 1266

Government
  - Mayor: Tomasz Sobieraj (KO)

Area
  - Total: 115.5 km^{2} (44.6 sq mi)
- Elevation: 32 m (105 ft)

Population (31 December 2021)
  - Total: 104,994 ▼ (37th)
  - Density: 909.0/km^{2} (2,354/sq mi)
- Time zone: UTC+1 (CET)
  - Summer (DST): UTC+2 (CEST)
- Postal code: 75-900, 75-902, 75-007, 75-016
- Area code: +48 94
- Vehicle registration: ZK
- Climate: Cfb
- Website: www.koszalin.pl

Koszalin (Polish: [kɔˈʂalin]; Kashubian: Kòszalëno; German: Köslin, pronounced [kœsˈliːn]) is a city in northwestern Poland, in West Pomerania. It is located 12 kilometres (7 miles) south of the Baltic Sea coast, and intersected by the river Dzierżęcinka. Koszalin is also a county-status city and capital of Koszalin County of West Pomeranian Voivodeship.

Founded in the Middle Ages, Koszalin was a seaport until the 17th century, and one of the main cities of Central Pomerania (along with Kołobrzeg and Słupsk). From 1950 to 1998 it was the administrative capital of Central Pomerania, as the Koszalin Voivodeship, and remains its largest city. Located on the main highway and railroad between the Tricity and Szczecin, Koszalin is an important regional industrial, cultural and educational center. It is home to the Koszalin University of Technology, Polish Air Force Training Center and the Polish Border Guard Academy. Its Gothic Cathedral serves as the seat of the Roman Catholic Diocese of Koszalin–Kołobrzeg. Koszalin is the host city of an annual festival of choirs of the Polish diaspora from various parts of the world.

== History ==
Human settlement in Koszalin dates back to prehistoric times. Various traces of human settlement of the Funnelbeaker, Globular Amphora and Lusatian cultures and from ancient Roman times and Early Middle Ages were discovered during archaeological excavations.

=== Middle Ages ===
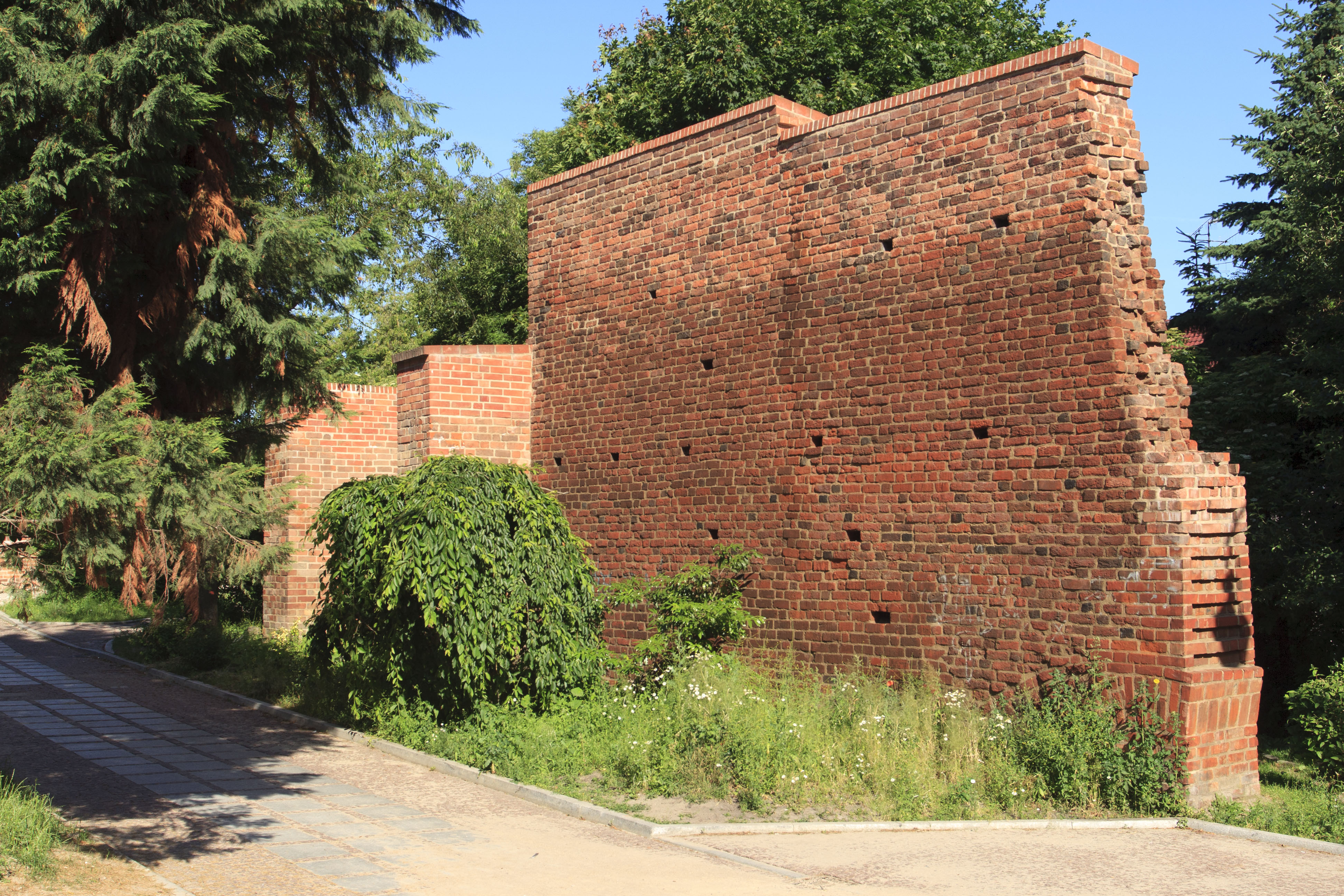
Medieval city walls

The territory became part of the emerging Polish state under Mieszko I around 967. According to the Medieval Chronicle of Greater Poland (Kronika Wielkopolska) Koszalin was one of the Pomeranian cities captured and subjugated by Duke Bolesław III Wrymouth of Poland in 1107 (other towns included Kołobrzeg, Kamień and Wolin). Afterwards, in the 12th century the area became part of the Griffin-ruled Duchy of Pomerania, a vassal state of Poland, which separated from Poland after the fragmentation of Poland into smaller duchies, and became a vassal of Denmark in 1185 and a part of the Holy Roman Empire from 1227.

In 1214, Bogislaw II, Duke of Pomerania, made a donation of a village known as Koszalice/Cossalitz by Chełmska Hill in Kołobrzeg Land to the Norbertine monastery in Białoboki near Trzebiatów. New, mostly German, settlers from outside of Pomerania were invited to settle the territory. In 1248, the eastern part of Kołobrzeg Land, including the village, was transferred by Duke Barnim I to the Roman Catholic Diocese of Kammin.

On 23 May 1266, Kammin bishop Hermann von Gleichen granted a charter to the village, granting it Lübeck law, local government, autonomy and multiple privileges to attract German settlers from the west. When in 1276 the bishops became the sovereign in neighboring Kołobrzeg, they moved their residence there, while the administration of the diocese was done from Koszalin. In 1278 a Cistercian monastery was established, which took care of the local parish church and St. Mary chapel on Chełmska Hill.

The city obtained direct access to the Baltic Sea when it gained the village of Jamno (1331), parts of Lake Jamno, a spit between the lake and the sea and the castle of Unieście in 1353. Thence, it participated in the Baltic Sea trade as a member of the Hanseatic League (from 1386), which led to several conflicts with the competing seaports of at Kołobrzeg and Darłowo. From 1356 until 1417/1422, the city was part of the Duchy of Pomerania-Wolgast. In 1446 Koszalin fought a victorious battle against the nearby rival city of Kołobrzeg. In 1475 a conflict between the city of Koszalin and the Pomeranian duke Bogislaw X broke out, resulting in the kidnapping and temporary imprisonment of the duke in Koszalin.

=== Early Modern Age ===
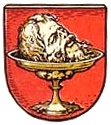
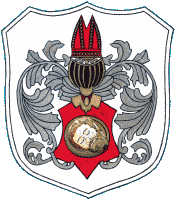
Coats of arms from ca. 1400–1800 and from 1800–1939

As a result of German colonization, the town became mostly German-speaking, putting indigenous Slavic speakers at disadvantage. In 1516 local Germans enforced a ban on buying goods from Slavic speakers. It was also forbidden to accept native Slavs to craft guilds, which indicates ethnic discrimination.

In 1531 riots took place between supporters and opponents of the Protestant Reformation. In 1534 the city became mostly Lutheran under the influence of Johannes Bugenhagen. In 1568, John Frederick, Duke of Pomerania and bishop of Cammin, started constructing a residence, finished by his successor Casimir VI of Pomerania in 1582. After the 1637 death of the last Pomeranian duke, Bogislaw XIV, the city passed to his cousin, Bishop Ernst Bogislaw von Croÿ of Kammin. Occupied by Swedish troops during the Thirty Years' War in 1637, some of the city's inhabitants sought refuge in nearby Poland. The city was granted to Brandenburg-Prussia after the Treaty of Westphalia (1648) and the Treaty of Stettin (1653), and with all of Farther Pomerania became part of the Brandenburgian Pomerania.

Now renamed Cöslin as part of the Kingdom of Prussia, the city was heavily damaged by a fire in 1718, but was rebuilt in the following years. In 1764 on the Chełmska Hill, now located within the city limits, a Pole Jan Gelczewski founded a paper mill that supplied numerous city offices.

=== Late Modern Age ===
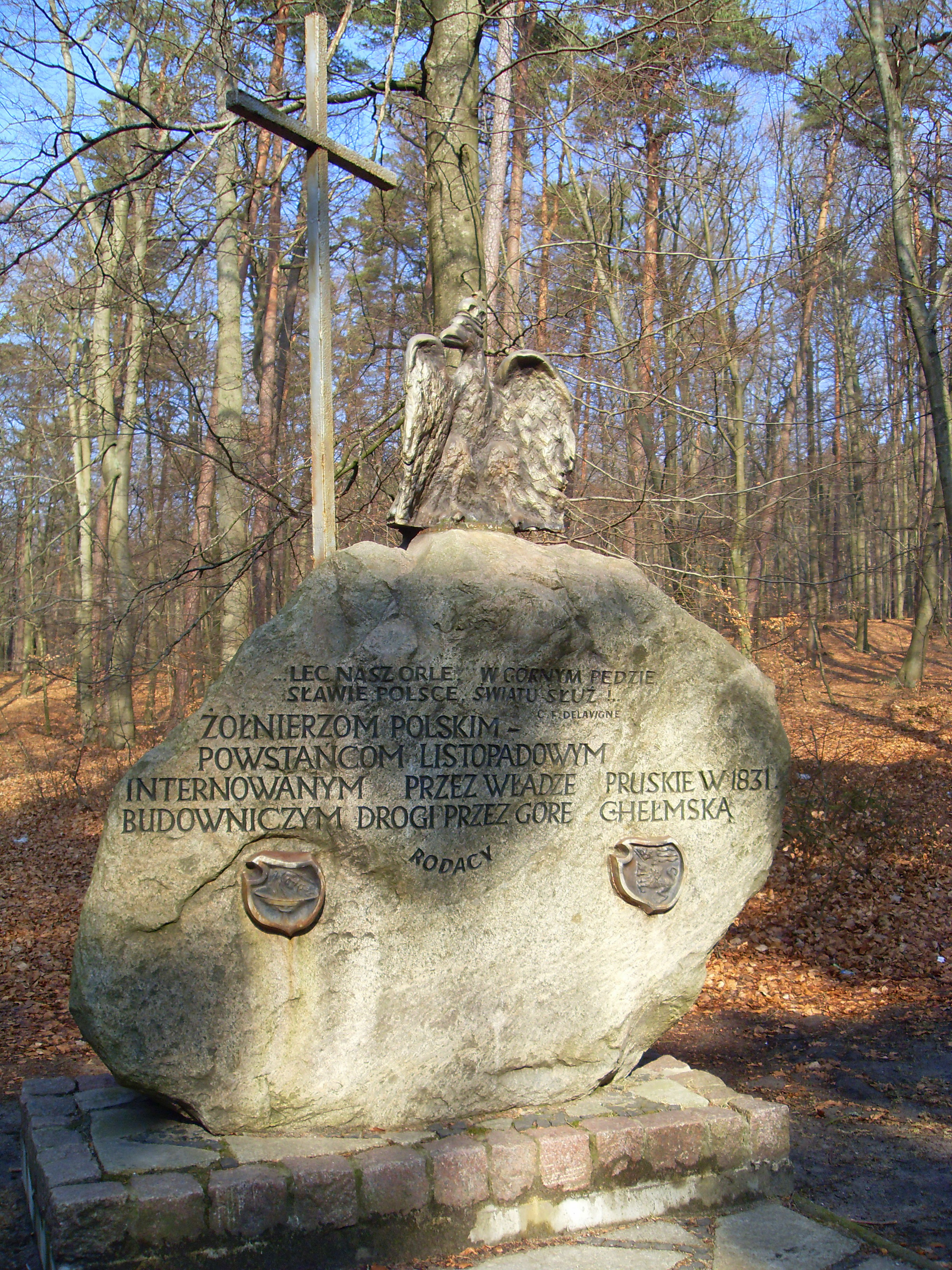
Monument to Polish insurgents from 1831 on Chełmska Hill

The city was occupied by French troops in 1807 after the War of the Fourth Coalition. Following the Napoleonic Wars, it became the capital of Fürstenthum District (county) and Regierungsbezirk Cöslin (government region) within the Province of Pomerania. The Fürstenthum District was dissolved on 1 September 1872 and replaced with the Cöslin District on 13 December. Between 1829 and 1845, a road connecting Cöslin (Koszalin) with Stettin (Szczecin) and Danzig (Gdańsk) was built. Part of this road, from Cöslin (Koszalin) to the nearby town of Sianów, was built in 1833 by around one hundred former Polish insurgents. In 1869, the Saint Joseph church was built by local Poles.

The town became part of the German Empire in 1871 during the unification of Germany. The railroad from Stettin through Cöslin and Stolp (Słupsk) to Danzig was constructed from 1858 to 1878. A military cadet school created by Frederick the Great in 1776 was moved from Kulm (Chełmno) to the city in 1890. The Kösliner Zeitung was as a local newspaper published in Köslin.

After the Nazi Party took power in Germany in 1933, a Gestapo station was established in the city and mass arrests of Nazi opponents were carried out. After the Nazis had closed down Dietrich Bonhoeffer's seminar in Finkenwalde (Zdroje) in 1937, Bonhoeffer chose the town as one of the sites where he illegally continued to educate vicars of the Confessing Church.

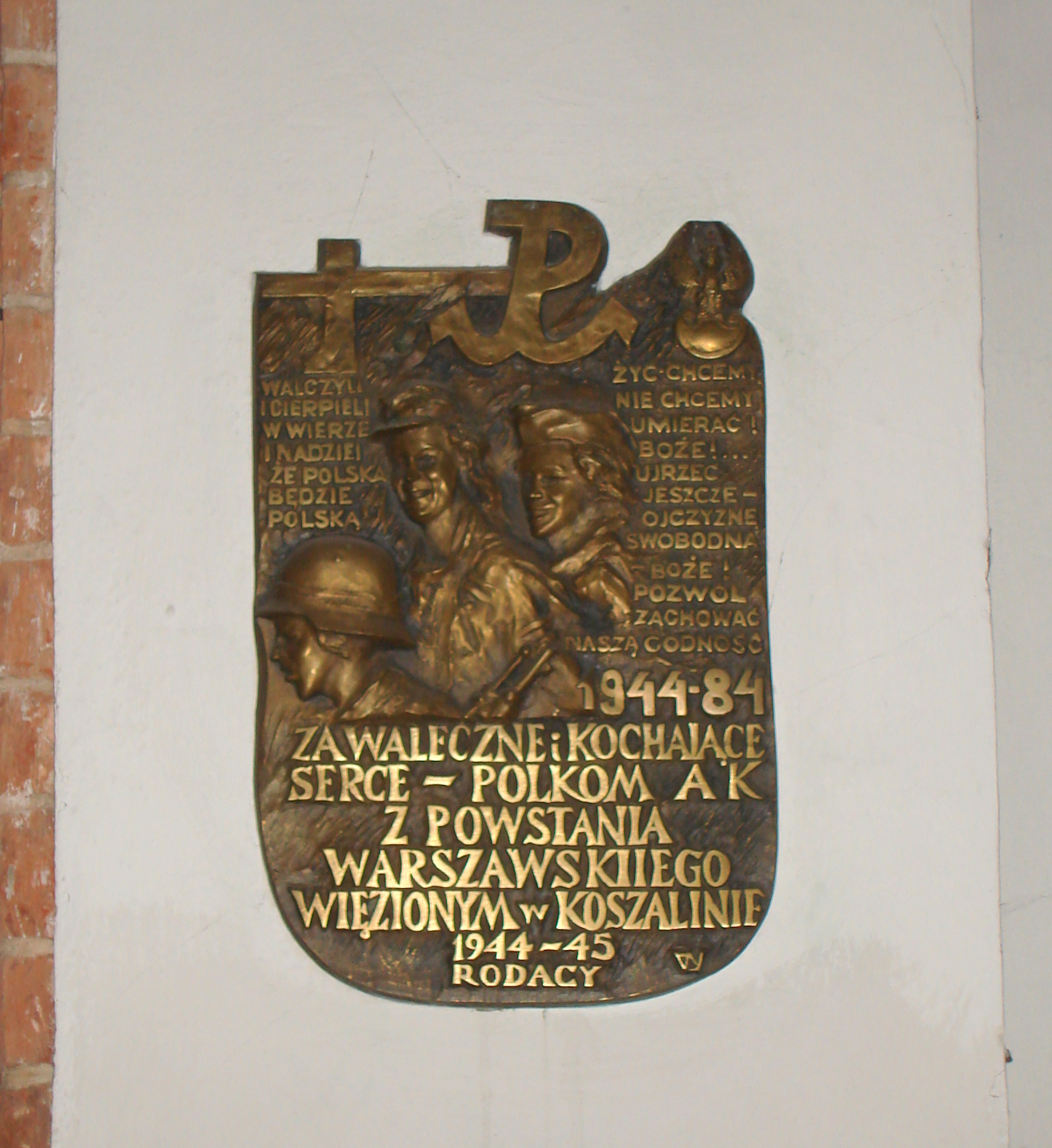
Memorial to Polish women of the resistance movement imprisoned in the city by the Germans during World War II

During the Second World War Köslin was the site of the first school for the "rocket troops" created on orders of Walter Dornberger, the Wehrmacht's head of the V-2 design and development program. The Polish resistance conducted espionage of German activity and distributed Polish underground press in the city. The Nazis brought many prisoners of war and forced labourers to the city, mainly Poles, but also Italians and French. The Germans operated several forced labour camps in the city, including a subcamp of the Stalag II-B POW camp. Polish forced labourers constituted up to 10% of the city's population during the war. Germany also operated a prison in the city, with forced labour subcamps in the region. After crushing the Warsaw Uprising, the Germans brought several transports of Poles from Warsaw to the city, mainly women and children.

=== After World War II ===
On 4 March 1945, the city was captured by the Red Army. Under the border changes forced by the Soviet Union in the post-war Potsdam Agreement, Koszalin became part of Poland as part of the so-called Recovered Territories. The city's German population that had not yet fled was expelled to the remainder of post-war Germany. The city was resettled by Poles and Kashubians, many of whom had been expelled from Polish territory annexed by the Soviets.

As early as March 1945 a Polish police unit was established, consisting of former forced labourers and prisoners of war, however, the Soviets, still present in the city, plundered local industrial factories in April. From May 1945, life in the destroyed city was being organized, the first post-war schools, shops and service premises were established. In 1946, the first public library was opened, whose director was later Maria Pilecka, the sister of Polish national hero Witold Pilecki. In March 1946, the anti-communist Home Army 5th Wilno Brigade was active in Koszalin. In July 1947, the last units of the Soviet Army left Koszalin, and from that time only Polish troops were stationed in the city. In 1953 a local radio station was founded in Koszalin.

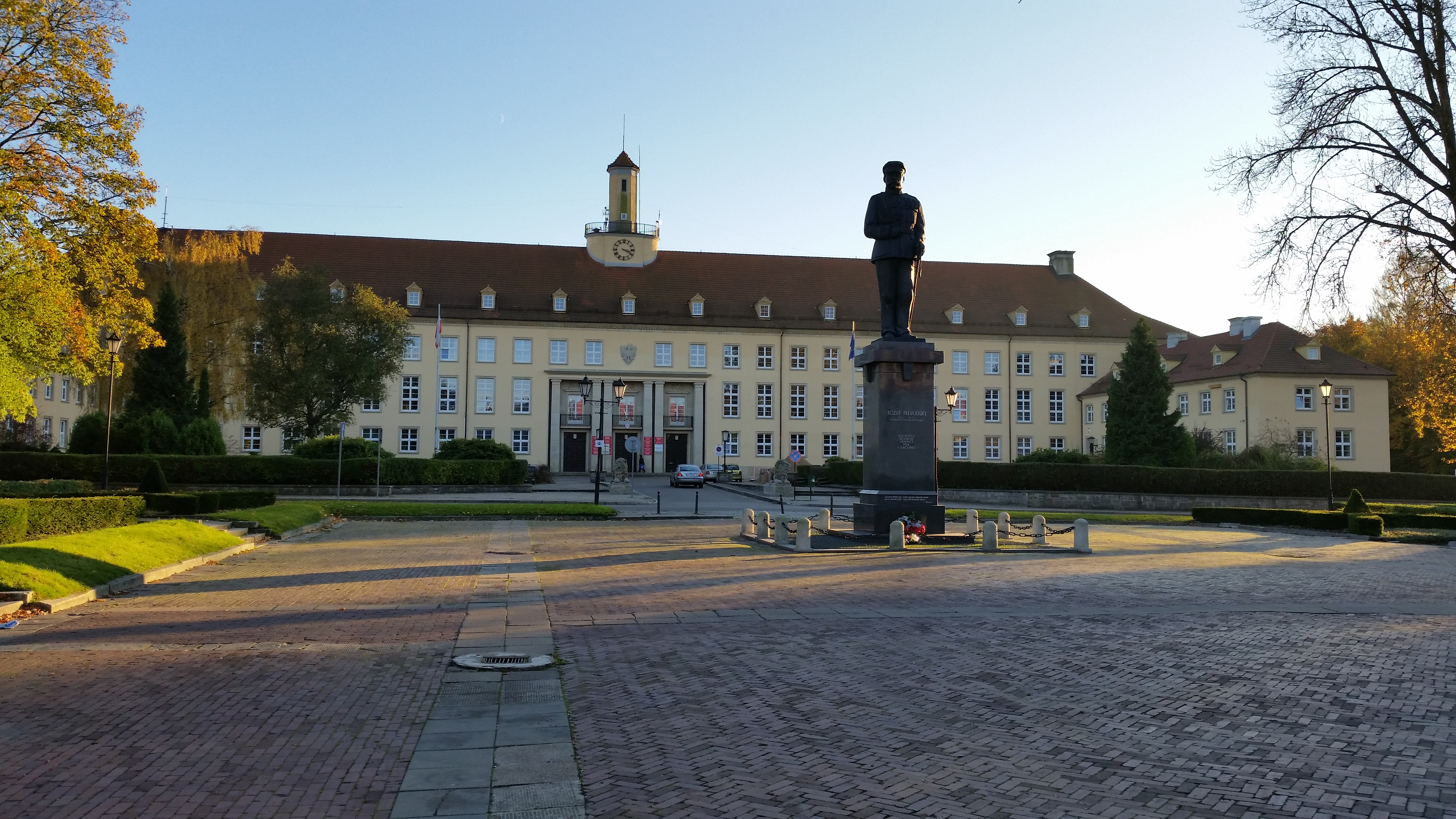
The Victory Square with the statue of Józef Piłsudski and the former Koszalin Voivodeship Office in the background

Initially, Koszalin was the first post-war regional capital of Polish Western Pomerania, before the administration finally moved to Szczecin in February 1946, after which the region was named the Szczecin Voivodeship. In 1950 this voivodeship was divided into a truncated Szczecin Voivodeship and Koszalin Voivodeship. In years 1950-75 Koszalin was the capital of the enlarged Koszalin Voivodeship sometimes called Middle Pomerania due to becoming the fastest growing city in Poland. In years 1975-98 it was the capital of the smaller Koszalin Voivodeship. As a result of the Local Government Reorganization Act (1998) Koszalin became part of the West Pomeranian Voivodeship (effective 1 January 1999) regardless of an earlier proposal for a new Middle Pomeranian Voivodeship covering approximately the area of former Koszalin Voivodeship (1950–75).

In 1991, Koszalin was visited by Pope John Paul II. On the fifth anniversary of his visit, his monument was unveiled in the city center.

== Transport ==
The S6 expressway bypasses Koszalin to the north. Two exits of the expressway serve Koszalin (exits 24 and 23). Upon completion of the S6 expressway to the north of Koszalin national road 6 (which formerly passed through the town) was re-numbered to voivodeship road 112.

Koszalin lies on the main Gdańsk-Szczecin railway line. Minor railway lines connect it to the coastal towns of Kołobrzeg and Mielno.

Long distance coaches link Koszalin to Gdańsk / Szczecin often calling at Sławno, Słupsk and Lębork. Other buses link it to Kołobrzeg, Mielno and other smaller towns.

== Landmarks ==
The city borders on Chełmska Hill (Polish: Góra Chełmska), a site of pagan worship in prehistory, and upon which is now built the tower "sanctuary of the covenant", which was consecrated by Pope John Paul II in 1991, and is currently a pilgrimage site. Also an observation tower is located on the hill. At the entrance to the sanctuary there is a monument dedicated to the Polish November insurgents of 1831, who, imprisoned by Prussian authorities, built a road connecting Koszalin with nearby Sianów.

Koszalin's most distinctive landmark is the Gothic St. Mary's Cathedral, dating from the early 14th century. Positioned in front of the cathedral is a monument commemorating John Paul II's visit to the city.

Other city landmarks include the Park of the Dukes of Pomerania (Park Książąt Pomorskich), the Koszalin Museum, the main post office, the 16th-century Wedding Palace and the Culture Centre 105 (Centrum Kultury 105).

The city also has monuments dedicated to Polish national heroes: Józef Piłsudski, Władysław Anders, Kazimierz Pułaski, Władysław Sikorski, as well monuments of the 19th-century Polish poets Cyprian Norwid and Adam Mickiewicz.

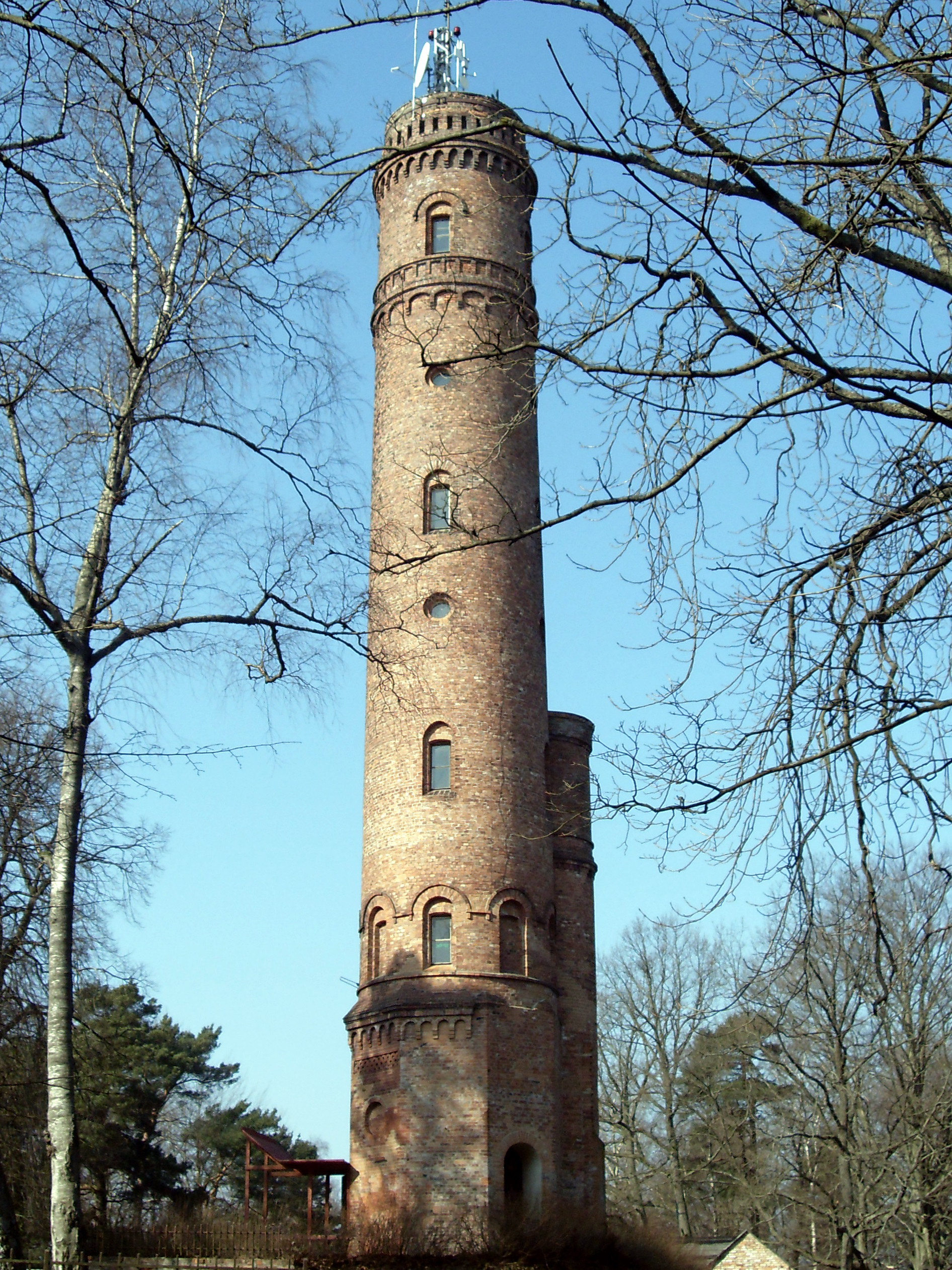
Observation tower on Góra Chełmska

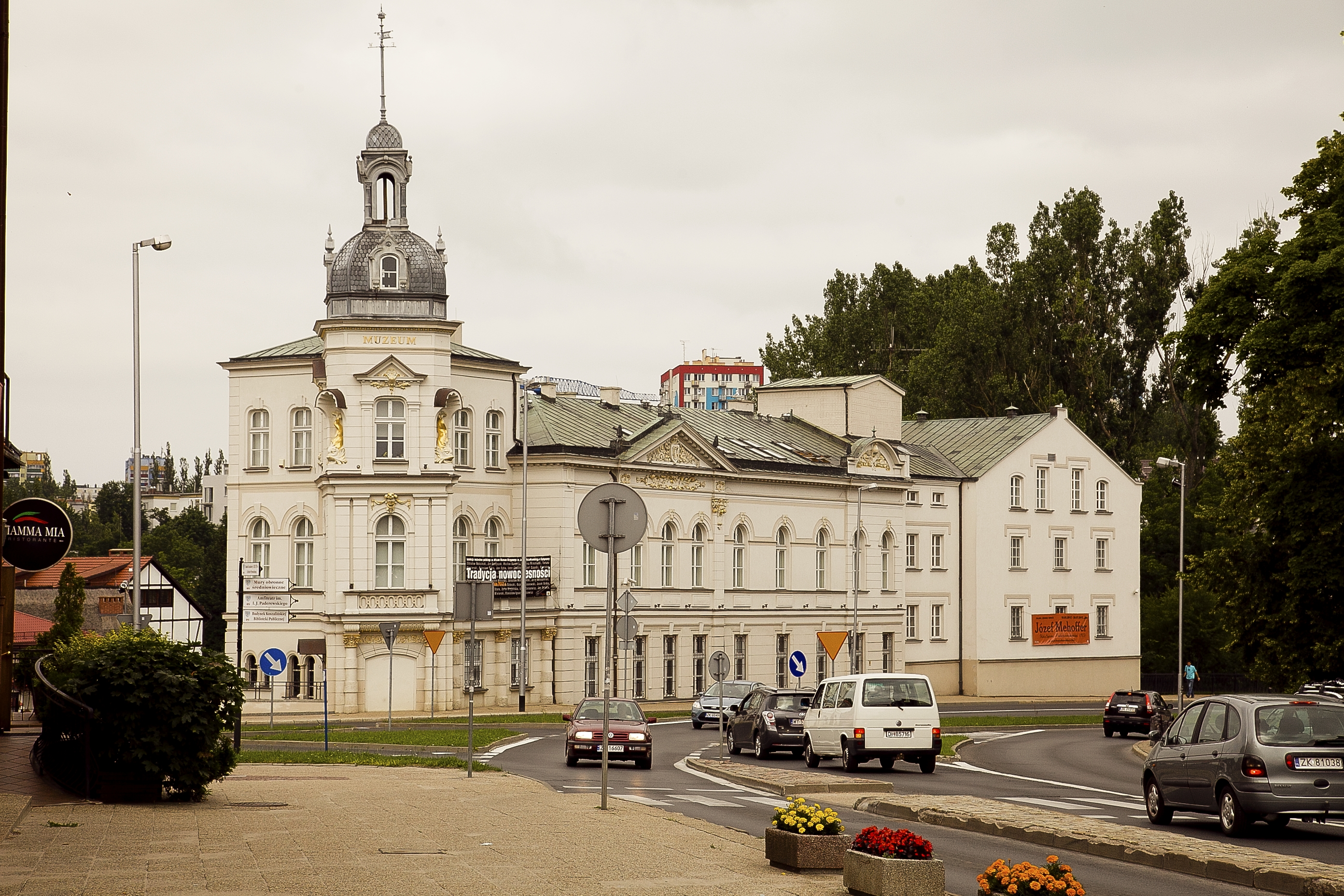
Koszalin Museum

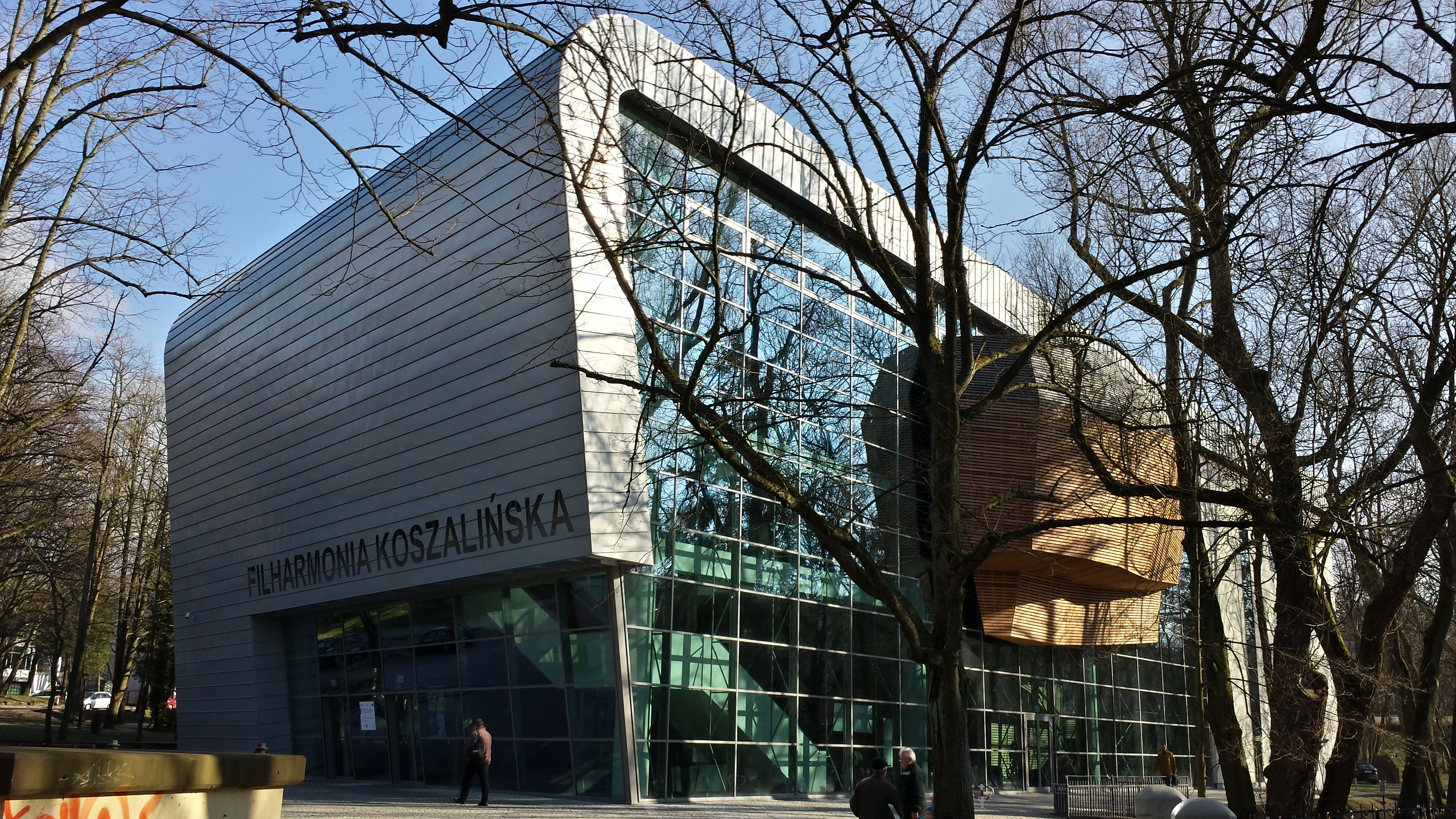
The new building of the Koszalin Philharmonic

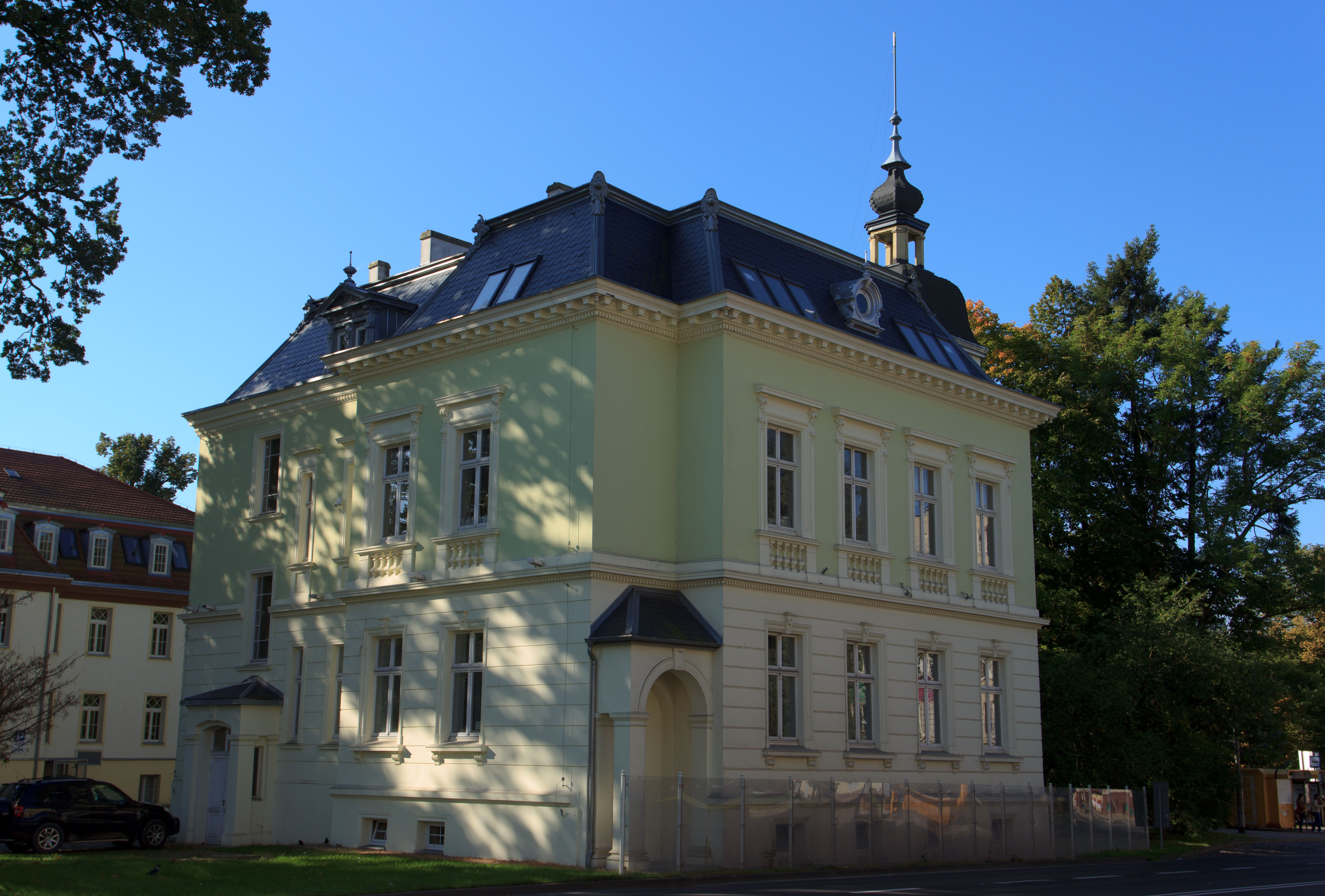
A historic villa on Zwycięstwa Street

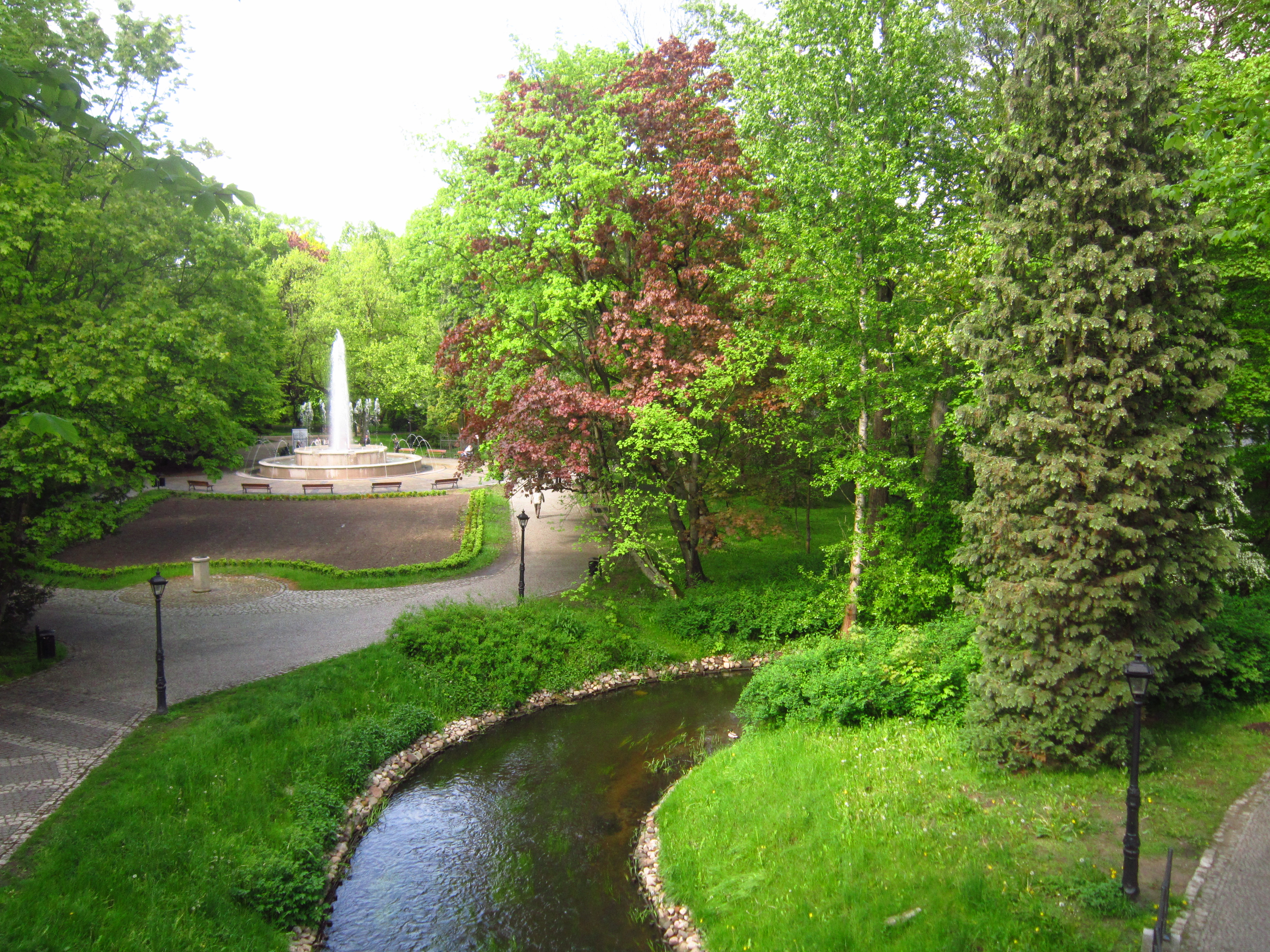
Park of the Dukes of Pomerania (Park Książąt Pomorskich)

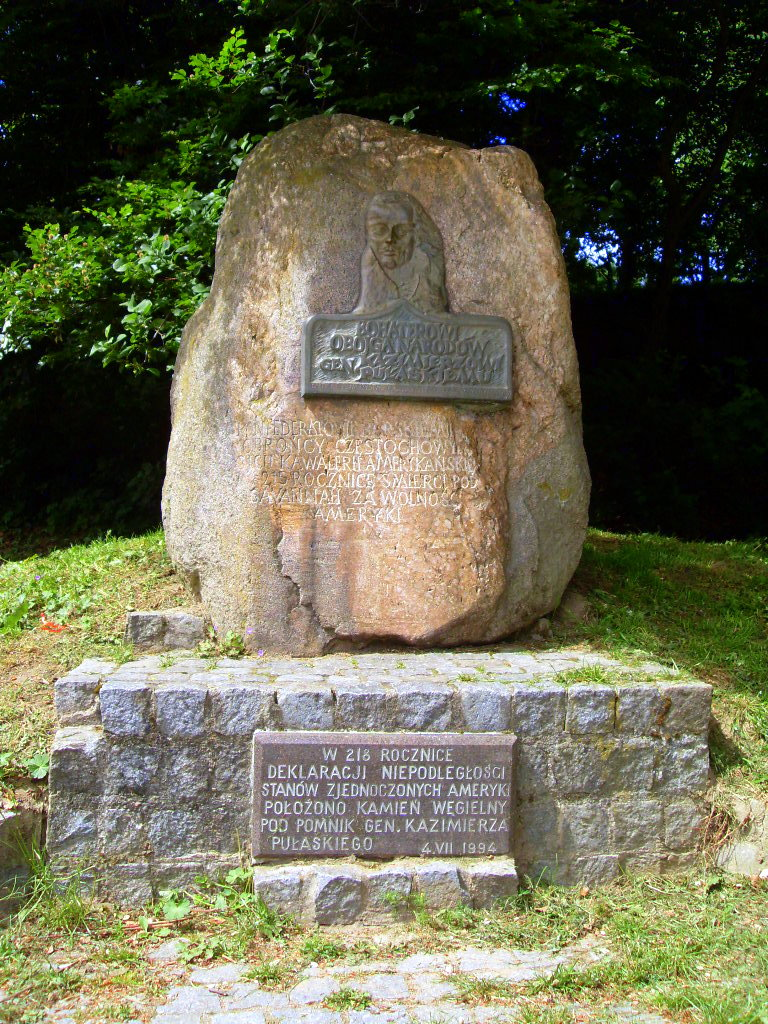
Memorial stone dedicated to Kazimierz Pułaski in the Amphitheater Park

== Nearby cities and villages ==
Nearby cities:

- Sianów
- Mielno
- Polanów
- Bobolice

Nearby villages:

- Manowo
- Skwierzynka
- Kędzierzyn
- Niekłonice
- Świeszyno
- Stare Bielice
- Biesiekierz
- Nowe Bielice
- Bonin

== Demographics ==
Historical population

Year	Pop.	±%
1740	2,535	—
1782	2,933	+15.7%
1791	3,071	+4.7%
1794	3,286	+7.0%
1812	3,802	+15.7%
1816	4,636	+21.9%
1831	6,541	+41.1%
1843	8,114	+24.0%

Year	Pop.	±%
1852	9,398	+15.8%
1861	11,303	+20.3%
1880	16,834	+48.9%
1900	20,417	+21.3%
1910	23,236	+13.8%
1925	28,812	+24.0%
1939	33,479	+16.2%
1950	18,940	−43.4%

Year	Pop.	±%
1960	44,410	+134.5%
1970	65,200	+46.8%
1978	86,414	+32.5%
1988	106,519	+23.3%
2002	108,719	+2.1%
2011	109,248	+0.5%
2021	105,883	−3.1%

== Climate ==
The climate is oceanic (Köppen: Cfb) with some humid continental characteristics (Dfb), usually categorized if the 0 °C isotherm is used (for the same classification). Being in Western Pomerania and near the Baltic Sea, it has a much more moderate climate than the other large Polish cities. The summers are warm and practically never hot as in the south and the winters are often more moderate than the northeast and east, although still cold, yet it is not as mild as Western Europe. Daily averages below freezing point can be found in January and February, while in the summer they are between 15 and 16 °C, relatively cool. The average annual precipitation is 704 mm, distributed during the year. Koszalin is one of the sunniest cities in the country.

Climate data for Koszalin (Wilkowo), elevation: 33 m, 1991–2020 normals, extremes 1951–present
Month	Jan	Feb	Mar	Apr	May	Jun	Jul	Aug	Sep	Oct	Nov	Dec	Year
Record high °C (°F)	13.2 (55.8)	17.7 (63.9)	23.3 (73.9)	28.2 (82.8)	31.2 (88.2)	35.6 (96.1)	36.4 (97.5)	37.1 (98.8)	33.9 (93.0)	27.3 (81.1)	18.8 (65.8)	13.6 (56.5)	37.1 (98.8)
Mean maximum °C (°F)	8.9 (48.0)	10.0 (50.0)	16.1 (61.0)	22.8 (73.0)	26.9 (80.4)	29.4 (84.9)	30.4 (86.7)	30.3 (86.5)	24.9 (76.8)	19.4 (66.9)	13.2 (55.8)	9.6 (49.3)	32.5 (90.5)
Mean daily maximum °C (°F)	2.5 (36.5)	3.5 (38.3)	7.0 (44.6)	12.8 (55.0)	17.1 (62.8)	20.1 (68.2)	22.4 (72.3)	22.5 (72.5)	18.2 (64.8)	12.7 (54.9)	7.1 (44.8)	3.5 (38.3)	12.5 (54.5)
Daily mean °C (°F)	0.3 (32.5)	0.9 (33.6)	3.3 (37.9)	8.0 (46.4)	12.3 (54.1)	15.6 (60.1)	17.9 (64.2)	17.9 (64.2)	14.0 (57.2)	9.3 (48.7)	4.8 (40.6)	1.6 (34.9)	8.8 (47.8)
Mean daily minimum °C (°F)	−1.9 (28.6)	−1.6 (29.1)	0.2 (32.4)	3.8 (38.8)	7.8 (46.0)	11.3 (52.3)	13.7 (56.7)	13.8 (56.8)	10.4 (50.7)	6.4 (43.5)	2.6 (36.7)	−0.6 (30.9)	5.5 (41.9)
Mean minimum °C (°F)	−11.4 (11.5)	−9.6 (14.7)	−6.5 (20.3)	−2.3 (27.9)	0.9 (33.6)	5.7 (42.3)	9.1 (48.4)	8.5 (47.3)	4.4 (39.9)	0.0 (32.0)	−3.6 (25.5)	−8.1 (17.4)	−14.4 (6.1)
Record low °C (°F)	−26.7 (−16.1)	−26.7 (−16.1)	−18.7 (−1.7)	−10.1 (13.8)	−3.9 (25.0)	−0.6 (30.9)	2.6 (36.7)	2.3 (36.1)	−0.2 (31.6)	−6.1 (21.0)	−14.0 (6.8)	−19.7 (−3.5)	−26.7 (−16.1)
Average precipitation mm (inches)	52.4 (2.06)	40.1 (1.58)	46.0 (1.81)	33.8 (1.33)	54.3 (2.14)	76.4 (3.01)	90.2 (3.55)	88.8 (3.50)	74.7 (2.94)	66.0 (2.60)	56.1 (2.21)	59.2 (2.33)	738.2 (29.06)
Average extreme snow depth cm (inches)	5.1 (2.0)	5.5 (2.2)	3.4 (1.3)	0.3 (0.1)	0.0 (0.0)	0.0 (0.0)	0.0 (0.0)	0.0 (0.0)	0.0 (0.0)	0.4 (0.2)	1.4 (0.6)	3.8 (1.5)	5.5 (2.2)
Average precipitation days (≥ 0.1 mm)	17.37	15.74	13.57	11.23	13.10	13.17	14.57	14.60	13.90	16.13	16.30	18.77	178.44
Average snowy days (≥ 0 cm)	11.1	10.8	5.3	0.3	0.0	0.0	0.0	0.0	0.0	0.2	2.0	7.2	36.9
Average relative humidity (%)	85.7	83.4	78.9	72.8	74.2	76.3	77.4	77.1	80.4	83.7	87.5	87.9	80.5
Average dew point °C (°F)	−3 (27)	−2 (28)	0 (32)	3 (37)	7 (45)	11 (52)	14 (57)	13 (55)	10 (50)	6 (43)	4 (39)	0 (32)	5 (41)
Mean monthly sunshine hours	44.7	67.8	132.2	203.4	262.7	256.8	259.2	233.2	166.5	111.1	50.6	32.4	1,820.6
Source 1: Institute of Meteorology and Water Management
Source 2: Meteomodel.pl (records, relative humidity 1991–2020), Time and Date (dewpoints, 2005-2015)

== Sports ==
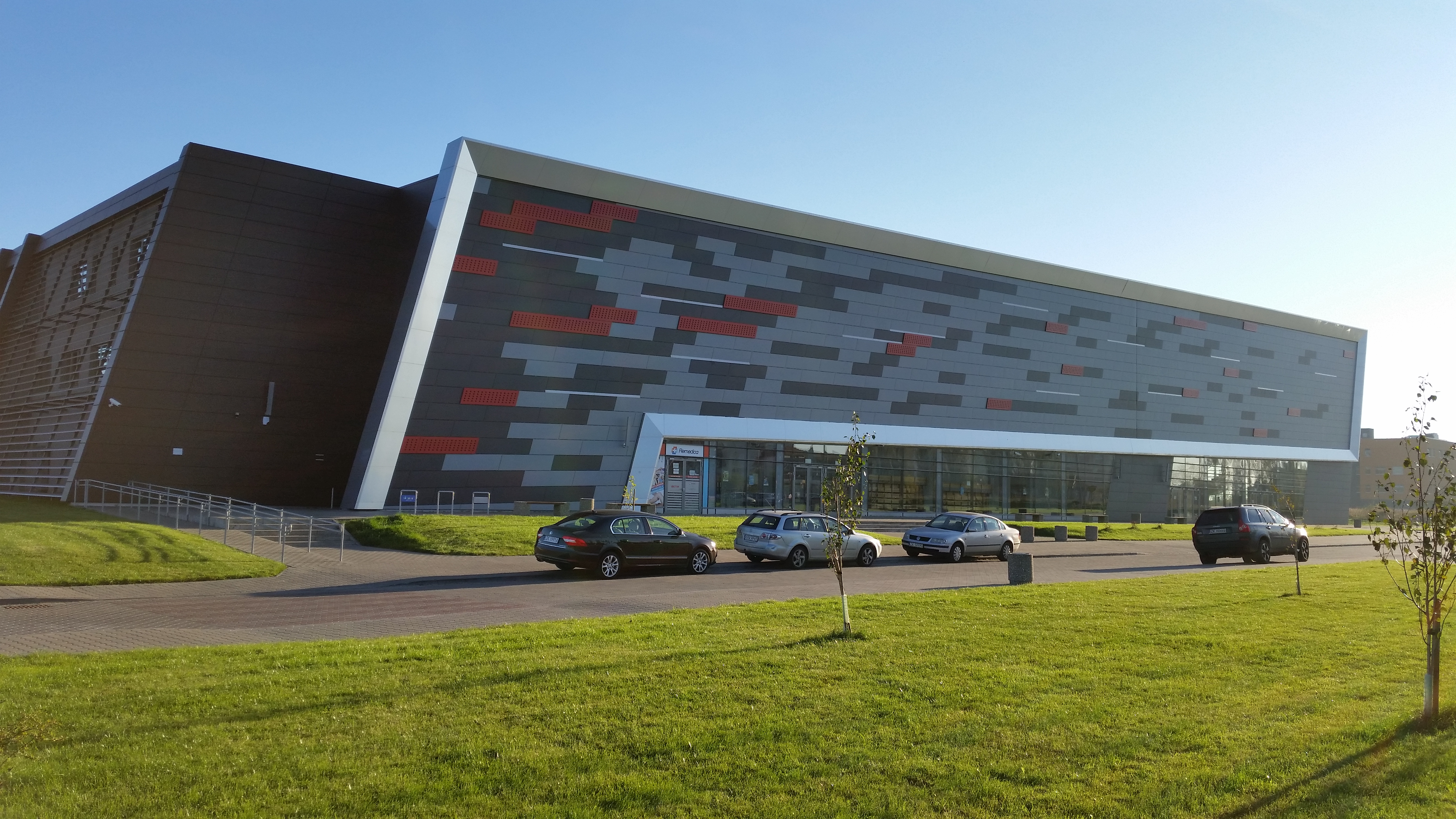
A multi-purpose indoor arena HWS Koszalin

- AZS Koszalin - men's basketball team, playing in the Polish Basketball League (the top division)
- AZS Politechnika Koszalin - women's handball team playing in Polish Ekstraklasa Women's Handball League: 3rd place in 1st league in 2003/2004 season; promoted to Premiership in 2004/2005 season.
- Gwardia Koszalin - football team, currently playing in the fourth Polish division.
- Bałtyk Koszalin - football team, currently playing in the fourth Polish division
- Tennis - Bałtyk Koszalin
- Rugby - Rugby Club Koszalin
- Motorsport - Klub Motor Sport Koszalin
- American Football - Korsarze Koszalin

== Film festival ==
The city has organised an annual film festival since 1973 titled the Koszalin Festival of Film Debuts "The Youth and Film" (Polish: Koszaliński Festiwal Debiutów Filmowych "Młodzi i Film") with the aim to promote young filmmakers. Since 2007, the festival has been a competition review of Polish debuts (feature and short films, documentaries and animations). Besides the competition, there are retrospectives, workshops, and discussions about young cinema entitled "Honesty to Honesty" (Polish: Szczerość za szczerość). The festival is known to be the oldest festival of young cinema in Poland. Among the filmmakers who debuted with their films at the festival are Krzysztof Zanussi, Krzysztof Kieślowski, Agnieszka Holland, Filip Bajon and Barbara Sass.

== Major corporations ==
- Zakład Energetyczny Koszalin SA
- Brok Brewery SA
- NordGlass AutoGlass
- TWIP Foundation

== Education ==
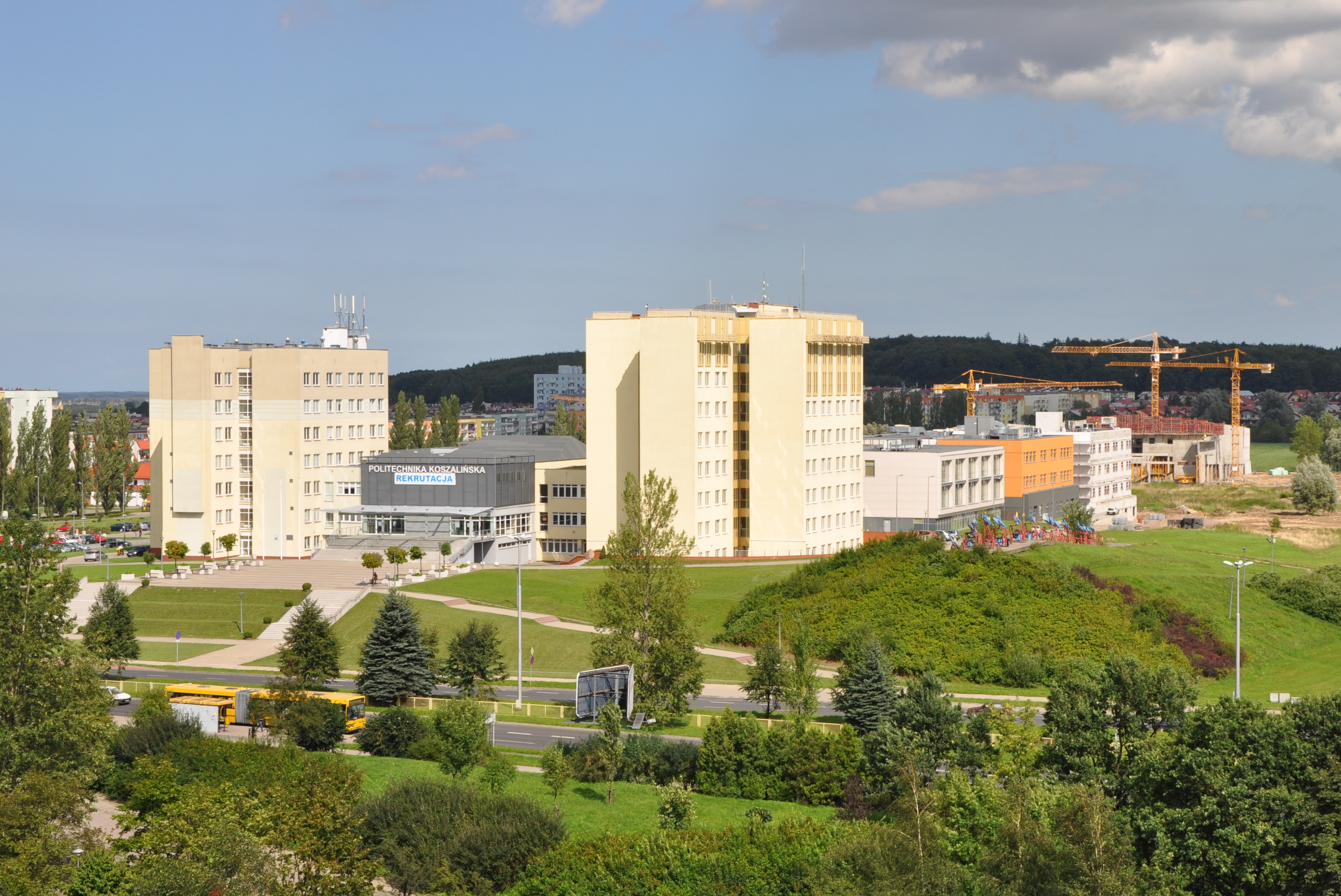
Koszalin University of Technology

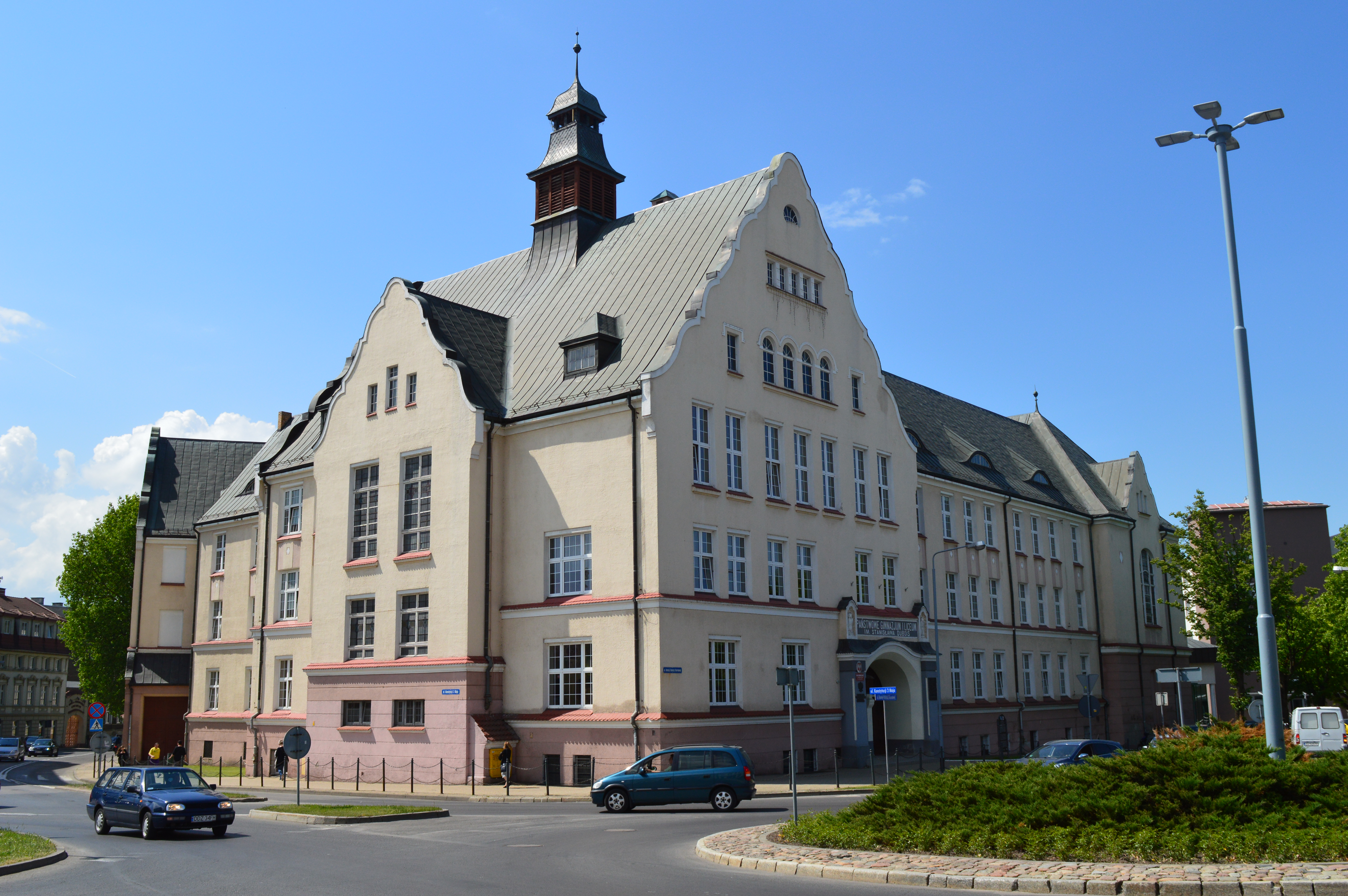
Stanisław Dubois High School in Koszalin

- Koszalin University of Technology (Politechnika Koszalińska)
- Baltic College (Bałtycka Wyższa Szkoła Humanistyczna)
- Air Force training center (Centrum Szkolenia Sił Powietrznych im. Romualda Traugutta)
- Koszalin University of Humanities (Koszalińska Wyższa Szkoła Nauk Humanistycznych)
- State Higher Vocational School in Koszalin (Państwowa Wyższa Szkoła Zawodowa w Koszalinie)
- Major Seminary of the Diocese of Koszalin-Kolobrzeska in Koszalin (Wyższe Seminarium Duchowne Diecezji Koszalińsko-Kołobrzeskiej w Koszalinie)
- Team State School of Music (Zespół Państwowych Szkół Muzycznych im. Grażyny Bacewicz)
- School Arts Team (Zespół Szkół Plastycznych im. Władysława Hasiora)
- 1st. High School Stanisława Dubois (Dubois or colloquially Dibulec)
- 2nd. High School Władysława Broniewskiego (colloquially Bronek)
- 5th. High School Stanisława Lema (Jedności)
- 6th. High School Cypriana Norwida (Podgórna)

== Notable people ==
- Daniel Liczko (1615–1662), Sergeant of the Dutch colonial army in New Amsterdam
- Ewald Christian von Kleist (1715–1759), poet and cavalry officer
- Rudolf Clausius (1822–1888), physicist and mathematician and a founder of thermodynamics
- Karl Adolf Lorenz (1837–1923), conductor, composer and music pedagogue
- Hans Richert (1869–1940), school reformer
- Hans Grade (1879–1946), aviation pioneer
- Fritz von Brodowski (1886–1944), German army general, controversially killed while in French custody during WWII
- Georg Wendt (1889–1948), politician, member of the SPD and SED
- Friedrich-Karl Burckhardt (1889–1962), World War I flying ace
- Peter von Heydebreck (1889–1934), NSDAP politician
- Paul Dahlke (1904–1984), stage and film actor
- Heinz Pollay (1908–1979), dressage horse rider, competed in the 1936 and 1952 Summer Olympics
- Martin Ruhnke (1921–2004), musicologist
- Hans-Joachim Preil (1923–1999), actor and comedian
- Leslie Brent (1925–2019), immunologist and zoologist
- Waltraud Nowarra (1940–2007), chess player
- Vladimir Berdnikov (born 1946), painter and glass artist
- Mirosław Okoński (born 1958), footballer, played 418 pro games and 29 for Poland
- Kuba Wojewódzki (born 1963), journalist, TV personality, drummer and comedian
- Mirosław Trzeciak (born 1968), footballer, director of sport development of Legia Warszawa
- Marcin Horbacz (born 1974), modern pentathlete, competed at the 2008 Summer Olympics
- Adam Sztaba (born 1975), composer, music producer, conductor, arranger and pianist
- Maciej Stachowiak (born 1976), software engineer at Apple Inc.
- Kasia Cerekwicka (born 1980), pop singer
- Marzena Diakun (born 1981), conductor
- Jakub Różalski (born 1981), artist and illustrator
- Paweł Spisak (born 1981), equestrian, competed at the 2004, 2008, 2012 and 2016 Summer Olympics
- Sebastian Mila (born 1982), Polish professional footballer
- Schwesta Ewa (born 1984), musician, moved to Germany as a child
- Joanna Majdan (born 1988), chess player
- Daria Zawiałow (born 1992), singer-songwriter
- Kacper Kozłowski (born 2003), Polish professional footballer

== Twin towns – sister cities ==
Koszalin is twinned with:

- Albano Laziale, Italy
- Bourges, France
- Fuzhou, China
- Gladsaxe, Denmark
- Ivano-Frankivsk, Ukraine
- Kristianstad, Sweden
- Lida, Belarus
- Neubrandenburg, Germany
- Neumünster, Germany
- Schwedt, Germany
- Seinäjoki, Finland
- Tempelhof-Schöneberg (Berlin), Germany
- Trakai, Lithuania

== See also ==
- Museum of Vladimir Vysotsky in Koszalin
