= Vladimir Berdnikov =

Russian painter

Vladimir Ivanovich Berdnikov
- Born: 2 June 1946; Koszalin, Polish People's Republic
- Education: Smolensk State Pedagogical Institute
- Known for: Painting, glass art
- Awards: Honoured Artist of the Russian Federation
- Website: berdnikov.info

Vladimir Berdnikov (born 2 June 1946, Koszalin, Sheinsky Voivodeship, Polish People's Republic) is a Russian painter, glass artist, and artist of decorative and applied arts. He is notable for receiving the Honored Artist of Russia award in 1991 and for being a member of the Union of Artists and the Union of Designers of Russia.

== Biography ==
Vladimir Berdnikov was born in the city of Koszalin in Poland in 1946, where his father worked. In 1949, the family left Poland for the Bryansk region of Russia. In 1963, he graduated from the Zaborsk high school in the Bryansk region. In 1968, he graduated from Smolensk Pedagogical Institute with a degree in graphic design. Berdnikov was engaged in easel and monumental painting, as well as sculpture. His graduation work was a 12-square-meter mosaic panel of natural stone, titled "Girl on a Horse". Starting in 1968, he worked as an artist for the Pervomaisky Glass Factory (since 1970 – Chief Artist of Pervomaisky Glass Factory). At the factory, he began to manufacture blown glass products. All exhibitions of products of the Pervomaisky Glass Factory are necessarily accompanied by Berdnikov's picturesque canvases. His works were in the Fund of the USSR Ministry of Culture. The paintings are currently kept in the Roslavl Museum, the Crystal Museum in the city of Dyatkovo, the Smolensk Museum-Reserve, in a private art gallery in New York, in private collections in Russia and abroad. Glass products are in many museums in Russia and abroad.

Berdnikov is credited as the inventor of two new techniques for the production of glass products. His "know-how" is the development of glassware with a change in the axis of rotation (without knowing this technique, even a glazier can hardly guess how such an effect of forming colored glass is achieved), and the development of products on a "crumpled" leg.

His works are kept in Smolensk museums, in private collections in the US, Japan, and Germany. He mainly works with colored glass. Some of his notable works include vases 'Rose', 'Necklace', 'Lanterns', 'Branches' and 'Fireworks', and author's works 'Blue Birds', 'Smolensk Fortress'. His works are distinguished by strict architectonics, methods of folk craftsmanship and new modern forms. He creates both exhibition works and works of a utilitarian nature.

″Berdnikov was able to determine early on the basic principles of his artistic vision and find his own recognizable manner of conveying thoughts and feelings. The unifying principle in the artist's work can be considered color: saturated, thickening to blackness in glass and acquiring a strange orange reflection of the fire burning in glass furnaces in painting. Thanks to this shade, Berdnikov's landscapes, painted among the Smolensk and Bryansk hills and quite recognizable from the composition, disturb the viewer with their 'otherness', as if they were seen through the eyes of an alchemist. The original color scheme on the master's canvases emphasizes the pasty, rough as dross, smear. It's funny, but the two passions of the artist – Painting and Glass, seem to be playing in shape-shifters, and oil paints freeze hard, dense, rough, and hard glass gives the impression of a living and pulsating mass.″– N. Vostrikova, "Bee", 7. 2006.

== Exhibitions ==
Personal

- 1989 Smolensk
- 1995 Moscow – personal exhibition of art glass
- 2000 Dyatkovo (Bryansk region) — «Painting, glass Vladimir Berdnikov»
- 2000 Bryansk
- 2000 Roslavl
- 2006 n. Pervomaiskii Smolensk region – the personal anniversary exhibition
- 2010 Roslavl History and Art Museum
- 2015 Roslavl History and Art Museum
- 2015 Smolensk — «personal exhibition»

Participation in exhibitions

- 1966 года regional art exhibitions
- 1972, 1973 Moscow – Republican exhibition "Mass kinds of artistic products of enterprises of the RSFSR"
- 1973, 1977 Moscow – the exhibition of art glass factories of the RSFSR
- 1980 Ryazan — V zone exhibition "Artists of the Black Earth"
- 1981 Moscow – Russian exhibition "Across the Motherland"
- 1985 Japan – International Exhibition "Interior"
- 1997 Moscow – VIII VIII Regional Exhibition "Artists of the central regions of Russia"
- 1999, 2004 Moscow — Russia Exhibition "Russia"
- 2000 Moscow – Russian art exhibition "Thy Name"
- 2002 Bryansk — regional exhibition "Young Russia"
- 2002 St. Petersburg, Elaginoostrovsky Palace Museum of arts and crafts and interior XVIII-XX centuries.
- 2003 Lipetsk — regional exhibition "Artists of the central regions of Russia"
- 2003 Voronezh — Russia exhibition "Heritage"
- 2005 Gagarin (Smolensk region) — regional exhibition "Time. Space. Man "
- 2007 Moscow, Russian Academy of Arts – regional exhibition of nominees for the award of the Central Federal District
- 2008 Yaroslavl — regional exhibition "Artists of the central regions of Russia"
- 2010 Ivanovo — "Artists of Smolensk"
- 2013 Belarus — «Landscapes of Russia and Belarus»

== Holders of his works ==
- Russian Academy of Arts
- Smolensk State Museum-Reserve
- Russian Museum of Decorative-Applied and Folk Art (Moscow)
- Museum of Glass Dyatkovo (Bryansk region)
- Roslavlsky History and Art Museum
- In private collections in the United States, Japan, Germany

== Prizes, awards ==
- Honored Artist of Russia (1991)
- Diploma of the Russian Academy of Arts (2001) — for his great achievements in the field of fine art
- Fellow of the Administration of the Smolensk regionи (2004–2005)
- Diploma of the Union of Artists of Russia (2006, 2009, 2011)
