= Koszalin University of Technology =

Polish public technical university

Coordinates: 54°12′13″N 16°11′50″E

- Politechnika Koszalińska
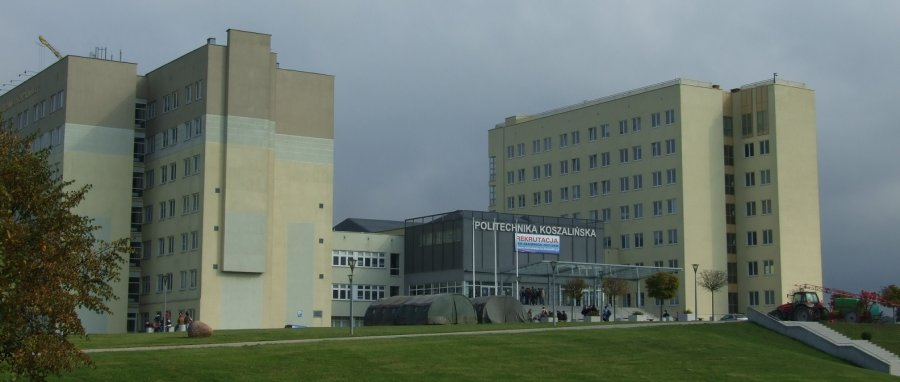
- Latin: Polytechnica Coslinensis
- Established: 1968
- Rector: Dr hab. Danuta Zawadzka, prof. PK
- Students: 3,197 (12.2023)
- Location: ul. Jana i Jędrzeja Śniadeckich 2,, Koszalin, Poland
- Website: www.tu.koszalin.pl

Koszalin University of Technology (Polish: Politechnika Koszalińska) is a Polish public technical university located in Koszalin and other cities, i.e. Chojnice.

The institution was established in 1968 as the Higher School of Engineering. The university obtained its present name and status in 1996.

The university consists of the following faculties and institutes:

1. Faculty of Civil and Environmental Engineering
2. Faculty of Economics and Management
3. Faculty of Electronics and Computer Science
4. Faculty of Mechanical Engineering
5. Institute of Mechatronics, Nanotechnology and Vacuum Technique

The University is taking part in international exchange programmes, including Erasmus Programme.
