= Osek =

Osek may refer to:

== Places ==
=== Czech Republic ===
- Osek (Beroun District), a municipality and village in the Central Bohemian Region
- Osek (Jičín District), a municipality and village in the Hradec Králové Region
- Osek (Písek District), a municipality and village in the South Bohemian Region
- Osek (Rokycany District), a municipality and village in the Plzeň Region
- Osek (Strakonice District), a municipality and village in the South Bohemian Region
- Osek (Teplice District), a town in the Ústí nad Labem Region
  - Osek Monastery, a Cistercian monastery
- Osek, a village and part of Kněžice (Nymburk District) in the Central Bohemian Region
- Osek, a village and part of Řenče in the Plzeň Region
- Osek nad Bečvou, a municipality and village in the Olomouc Region
- Velký Osek, a municipality and village in the Central Bohemian Region

=== Poland ===
- Osiek, Wejherowo County, also known as Òsek, a village in Poland

=== Slovenia ===
- Osek, Nova Gorica, a village in Slovenia

== Other ==
- OSEK, automotive electronics standard

== See also ==
- Osiek (disambiguation)
