= Piaseczny =

Piaseczny may refer to:

== People ==
- Andrzej Piaseczny (born 1971) more commonly known as Piasek, is a Polish singer

== Places ==
- Babiec Piaseczny, a village in the administrative district of Gmina Rościszewo
- Osiek Piaseczny, a village in the administrative district of Gmina Zawidz

== See also ==
- Piaseczno (disambiguation)
