= Osiek =

Osiek may refer to:

- Osiek, Świętokrzyskie Voivodeship, a town in south-central Poland
- Osiek, Oświęcim County in Lesser Poland Voivodeship (south Poland)
- Osiek, Lubin County in Lower Silesian Voivodeship (south-west Poland)
- Osiek, Oława County in Lower Silesian Voivodeship (south-west Poland)
- Osiek, Gmina Kostomłoty, Środa County in Lower Silesian Voivodeship (south-west Poland)
- Osiek, Trzebnica County in Lower Silesian Voivodeship (south-west Poland)
- Osiek, Brodnica County in Kuyavian-Pomeranian Voivodeship (north-central Poland)
- Osiek, Gmina Koronowo in Kuyavian-Pomeranian Voivodeship (north-central Poland)
- Osiek, Toruń County in Kuyavian-Pomeranian Voivodeship (north-central Poland)
- Osiek, Łowicz County in Łódź Voivodeship (central Poland)
- Osiek, Wieruszów County in Łódź Voivodeship (central Poland)
- Osiek, Olkusz County in Lesser Poland Voivodeship (south Poland)
- Osiek, Płock County in Masovian Voivodeship (central Poland)
- Osiek, Gmina Czerwińsk nad Wisłą in Masovian Voivodeship (east-central Poland)
- Osiek, Gmina Joniec in Masovian Voivodeship (east-central Poland)
- Osiek, Gmina Mochowo in Masovian Voivodeship (north-central Poland)
- Osiek, Gmina Zawidz in Masovian Voivodeship (north-central Poland)
- Osiek, Jarocin County in Greater Poland Voivodeship (west-central Poland)
- Osiek, Kościan County in Greater Poland Voivodeship (west-central Poland)
- Osiek, Gmina Nowe Skalmierzyce, Ostrów County in Greater Poland Voivodeship (west-central Poland)
- Osiek, Rawicz County in Greater Poland Voivodeship (west-central Poland)
- Osiek, Silesian Voivodeship (south Poland)
- Osiek, Strzelce-Drezdenko County in Lubusz Voivodeship (west Poland)
- Osiek, Żary County in Lubusz Voivodeship (west Poland)
- Osiek, Opole Voivodeship (south Poland)
- Osiek, Starogard County in Pomeranian Voivodeship (north Poland)
- Osiek, Wejherowo County in Pomeranian Voivodeship (north Poland)
- Osiek, Warmian-Masurian Voivodeship (north Poland)

== See also ==
- OSIEK, acronym for Organiza Societo de Internaciaj Esperanto-Konferencoj, a body which annually awards a prize for translation or for original literature in Esperanto
- Osiek nad Notecią, a village in Piła County, Greater Poland Voivodeship (west-central Poland)
- Osijek, a city in Croatia
