= Grabówiec, Sierpc County =

Grabówiec
- Village
- Location within Poland
- Coordinates: 52°48′21″N 19°31′18″E
- Country: Poland
- Voivodeship: Masovian
- County: Sierpc
- Gmina: Mochowo

Grabówiec [ɡraˈbuvjɛt͡s] is a village in the administrative district of Gmina Mochowo, within Sierpc County, Masovian Voivodeship, in east-central Poland.
