= Rence =

Rence may refer to:

- Renče, a settlement in Slovenia
- Řenče, a municipality in the Czech Republic
- Rence (singer-songwriter) (born 1998), an American musician
