= Rzeszotary-Zawady =

- Village
- Location within Poland
- Coordinates: 52°54′17″N 19°50′4″E
- Country: Poland
- Voivodeship: Masovian
- County: Sierpc
- Gmina: Rościszewo

Rzeszotary-Zawady [ʐɛʂɔˈtarɨ zaˈvadɨ] is a village in the administrative district of Gmina Rościszewo, within Sierpc County, Masovian Voivodeship, in east-central Poland.
