= Budy Milewskie =

- Village
- Location within Poland
- Coordinates: 52°50′N 19°58′E
- Country: Poland
- Voivodeship: Masovian
- County: Sierpc
- Gmina: Zawidz
- Population: 110

Budy Milewskie [ˈbudɨ miˈlɛfskʲɛ] is a village in the administrative district of Gmina Zawidz, within Sierpc County, Masovian Voivodeship, in east-central Poland.
