= Majki Małe =

- Village
- Location within Poland
- Coordinates: 52°46′N 19°51′E
- Country: Poland
- Voivodeship: Masovian
- County: Sierpc
- Gmina: Zawidz

Majki Małe [ˈmai̯ki ˈmawɛ] is a village in the administrative district of Gmina Zawidz, Sierpc County, Masovian Voivodeship, Poland.
