= Zglenice Duże =

- Village
- Location within Poland
- Coordinates: 52°47′N 19°36′E
- Country: Poland
- Voivodeship: Masovian
- County: Sierpc
- Gmina: Mochowo
- Population: 200

Zglenice Duże [zɡlɛˈnit͡sɛ ˈduʐɛ] is a village in the administrative district of Gmina Mochowo, within Sierpc County, Masovian Voivodeship, in east-central Poland.
