= Bożewo Nowe =

Village in Gmina Mochowo, Poland

- Village
- Location within Poland
- Coordinates: 52°42′00″N 19°33′00″E
- Country: Poland
- Voivodeship: Masovian
- County: Sierpc
- Gmina: Mochowo

Bożewo Nowe [bɔˈʐɛvɔ ˈnɔvɛ] is a village in the administrative district of Gmina Mochowo, within Sierpc County, Masovian Voivodeship, in east-central Poland.
