= Sulkowo-Bariany =

- Village
- Location within Poland
- Coordinates: 52°45′N 19°29′E
- Country: Poland
- Voivodeship: Masovian
- County: Sierpc
- Gmina: Mochowo
- Elevation: 114 m (374 ft)
- Population: 45

Sulkowo-Bariany [sulˈkɔvɔ baˈrjanɨ] is a village in the administrative district of Gmina Mochowo, within Sierpc County, Masovian Voivodeship, in east-central Poland.
