= Majki, Sierpc County =

Majki
- Village
- Location within Poland
- Coordinates: 52°46′N 19°51′E
- Country: Poland
- Voivodeship: Masovian
- County: Sierpc
- Gmina: Zawidz

Majki [ˈmai̯ki] is a village in the administrative district of Gmina Zawidz, within Sierpc County, Masovian Voivodeship, in east-central Poland.

== History ==
Majki was mentioned in the Słownik geograficzny Królestwa Polskiego in the late 19th century. At that time, the village was located in Płock Governorate and had a population of 132 inhabitants, living in 18 houses.
