= Śniedzanowo =

- Village
- Location within Poland
- Coordinates: 52°52′N 19°45′E
- Country: Poland
- Voivodeship: Masovian
- County: Sierpc
- Gmina: Rościszewo

Śniedzanowo [ɕɲɛd͡zaˈnɔvɔ] is a village in the administrative district of Gmina Rościszewo, within Sierpc County, Masovian Voivodeship, in east-central Poland.
