= Śniechy =

- Village
- Location within Poland
- Coordinates: 52°50′N 19°31′E
- Country: Poland
- Voivodeship: Masovian
- County: Sierpc
- Gmina: Mochowo

Śniechy [ˈɕɲɛxɨ] is a village in the administrative district of Gmina Mochowo, within Sierpc County, Masovian Voivodeship, in east-central Poland. It is approximately 12 km (7 mi) southwest of Sierpc and 122 km (76 mi) northwest of Warsaw.
