= Grabal =

- Village
- Location within Poland
- Coordinates: 52°56′N 19°32′E
- Country: Poland
- Voivodeship: Masovian
- County: Sierpc
- Gmina: Szczutowo
- Time zone: UTC+1 (CET)
  - Summer (DST): UTC+2 (CEST)
- Vehicle registration: WSE

Grabal [ˈɡrabal] is a village in the administrative district of Gmina Szczutowo, within Sierpc County, Masovian Voivodeship, in central Poland.

Five Polish citizens were murdered by Nazi Germany in the village during World War II.
