= Zawidz Mały =

- Village
- Location within Poland
- Coordinates: 52°50′N 19°54′E
- Country: Poland
- Voivodeship: Masovian
- County: Sierpc
- Gmina: Zawidz

Zawidz Mały [ˈzavit͡s ˈmawɨ] is a village in the administrative district of Gmina Zawidz, within Sierpc County, Masovian Voivodeship, in east-central Poland.
