= Białasy =

- Village
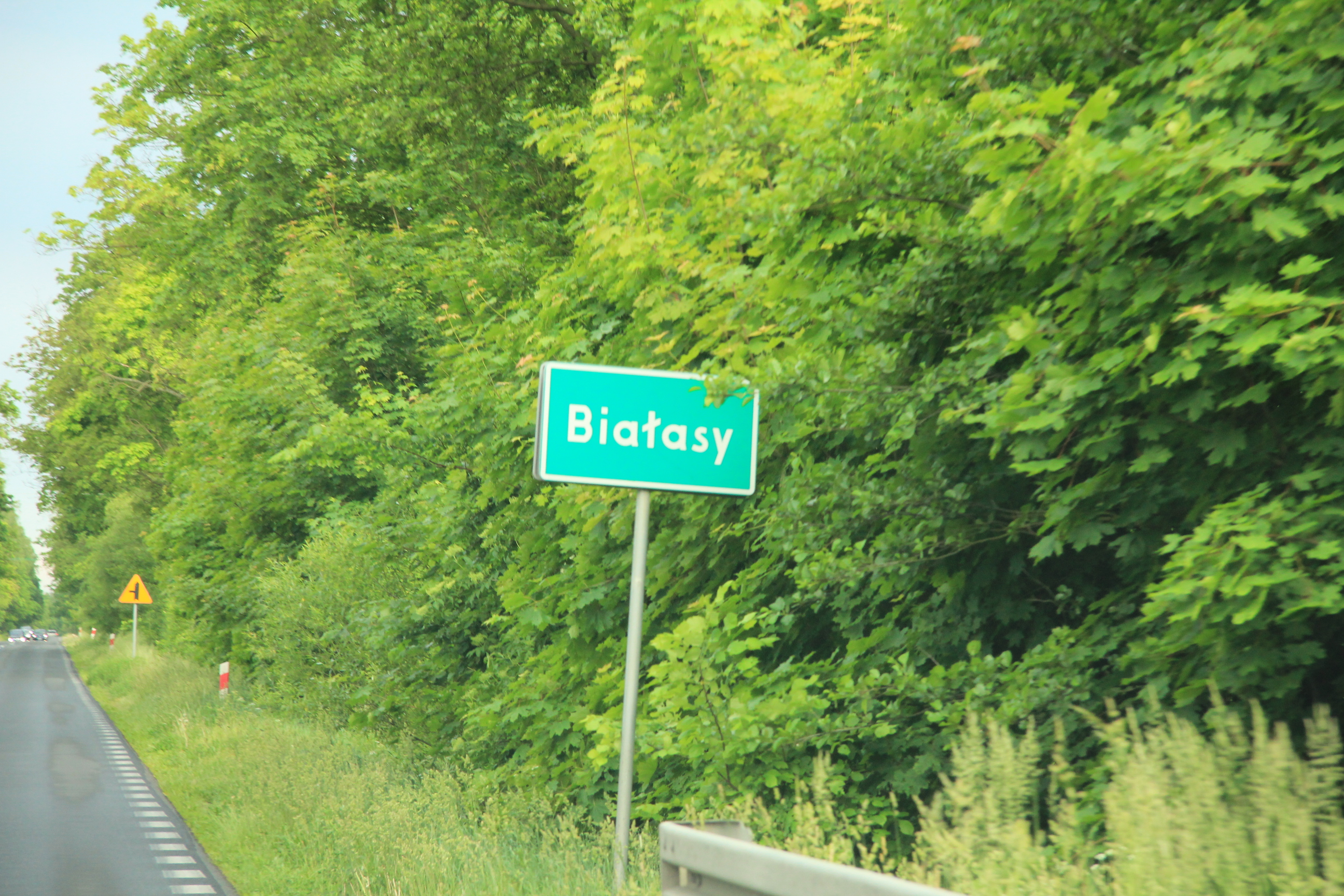

- Location within Poland
- Coordinates: 52°55′28″N 19°39′16″E
- Country: Poland
- Voivodeship: Masovian
- County: Sierpc
- Gmina: Szczutowo
- Population: 310

Białasy [bjaˈwasɨ] is a village in the administrative district of Gmina Szczutowo, within Sierpc County, Masovian Voivodeship, in east-central Poland.
