= Ligówko =

- Village
- Location within Poland
- Coordinates: 52°49′N 19°30′E
- Country: Poland
- Voivodeship: Masovian
- County: Sierpc
- Gmina: Mochowo

Ligówko [liˈɡufkɔ] is a village in the administrative district of Gmina Mochowo, within Sierpc County, Masovian Voivodeship, in east-central Poland.
