= Romatowo =

- Village
- Location within Poland
- Coordinates: 52°46′35″N 19°37′08″E
- Country: Poland
- Voivodeship: Masovian
- County: Sierpc
- Gmina: Mochowo

Romatowo [rɔmaˈtɔvɔ] is a village in the administrative district of Gmina Mochowo, within Sierpc County, Masovian Voivodeship, in east-central Poland.
