= Łazy, Sierpc County =

Łazy
- Village
- Location within Poland
- Coordinates: 52°54′51″N 19°31′12″E
- Country: Poland
- Voivodeship: Masovian
- County: Sierpc
- Gmina: Szczutowo
- Time zone: UTC+1 (CET)
  - Summer (DST): UTC+2 (CEST)

Łazy [ˈwazɨ] is a village in the administrative district of Gmina Szczutowo, within Sierpc County, Masovian Voivodeship, in north-central Poland.
