= Mochowo-Dobrzenice =

- Village
- Location within Poland
- Coordinates: 52°45′32″N 19°34′06″E
- Country: Poland
- Voivodeship: Masovian
- County: Sierpc
- Gmina: Mochowo

Mochowo-Dobrzenice [mɔˈxɔvɔ dɔbʐɛˈnit͡sɛ] is a village in the administrative district of Gmina Mochowo, within Sierpc County, Masovian Voivodeship, in east-central Poland.
