= Jaźwiny, Sierpc County =

Jaźwiny
- Village
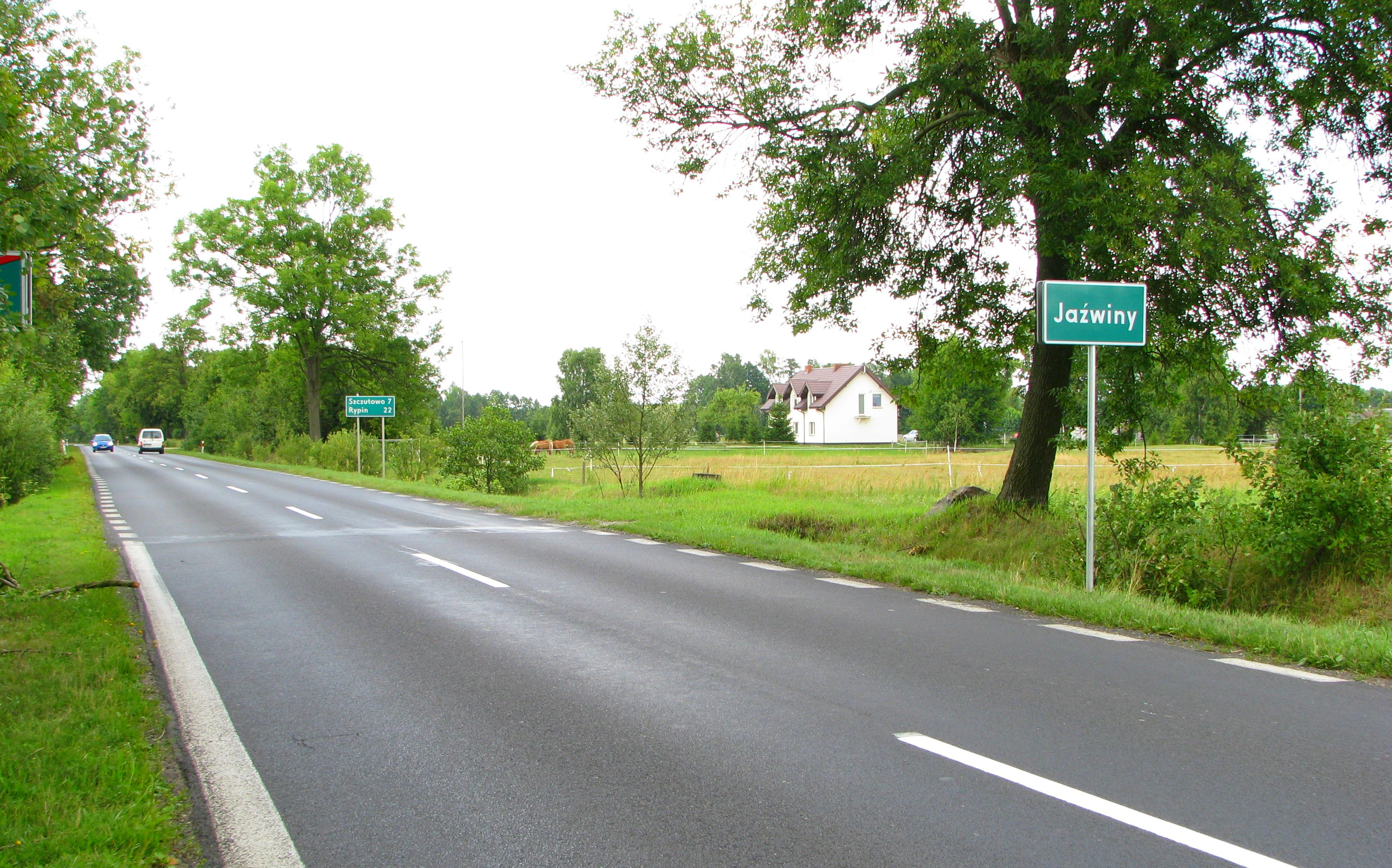

- Location within Poland
- Coordinates: 52°55′8″N 19°37′38″E
- Country: Poland
- Voivodeship: Masovian
- County: Sierpc
- Gmina: Szczutowo

Jaźwiny [jaʑˈvinɨ] is a village in the administrative district of Gmina Szczutowo, within Sierpc County, Masovian Voivodeship, in east-central Poland.
