= Żurawin, Masovian Voivodeship =

Żurawin
- Village
- Location within Poland
- Coordinates: 52°47′N 19°32′E
- Country: Poland
- Voivodeship: Masovian
- County: Sierpc
- Gmina: Mochowo

Żurawin [ʐuˈravin] is a village in east-central Poland, in the administrative district of Gmina Mochowo, within Sierpc County, Masovian Voivodeship.
