= Gugoły =

- Village
- Location within Poland
- Coordinates: 52°56′23″N 19°39′13″E
- Country: Poland
- Voivodeship: Masovian
- County: Sierpc
- Gmina: Szczutowo

Gugoły [ɡuˈɡɔwɨ] is a village in the administrative district of Gmina Szczutowo, within Sierpc County, Masovian Voivodeship, in east-central Poland.
