= Krajewice Małe =

- Village
- Location within Poland
- Coordinates: 52°48′N 19°47′E
- Country: Poland
- Voivodeship: Masovian
- County: Sierpc
- Gmina: Zawidz

Krajewice Małe [krajɛˈvit͡sɛ ˈmawɛ] is a village in the administrative district of Gmina Zawidz, within Sierpc County, Masovian Voivodeship, in east-central Poland.
