= Maluszyn, Masovian Voivodeship =

Maluszyn
- Village
- Location within Poland
- Coordinates: 52°53′N 19°32′E
- Country: Poland
- Voivodeship: Masovian
- County: Sierpc
- Gmina: Szczutowo

Maluszyn [maˈluʂɨn] is a village in the administrative district of Gmina Szczutowo, within Sierpc County, Masovian Voivodeship, in east-central Poland.
