= Kokoszczyn, Masovian Voivodeship =

Kokoszczyn
- Village
- Location within Poland
- Coordinates: 52°49′16″N 19°31′02″E
- Country: Poland
- Voivodeship: Masovian
- County: Sierpc
- Gmina: Mochowo

Kokoszczyn [kɔˈkɔʂt͡ʂɨn] is a village in the administrative district of Gmina Mochowo, within Sierpc County, Masovian Voivodeship, in east-central Poland.
