= Ostrów, Sierpc County =

Ostrów
- Village
- Location within Poland
- Coordinates: 52°54′8″N 19°49′24″E
- Country: Poland
- Voivodeship: Masovian
- County: Sierpc
- Gmina: Rościszewo

Population
  - Total: 70
- Time zone: UTC+1 (CET)
  - Summer (DST): UTC+2 (CEST)

Ostrów [ˈɔstruf] is a village in the administrative district of Gmina Rościszewo, within Sierpc County, Masovian Voivodeship, in north-central Poland.
