= Młotkowo-Kolonia =

- Village
- Location within Poland
- Coordinates: 52°49′55″N 19°49′01″E
- Country: Poland
- Voivodeship: Masovian
- County: Sierpc
- Gmina: Zawidz

Młotkowo-Kolonia [mwɔtˈkɔvɔ kɔˈlɔɲa] is a village in the administrative district of Gmina Zawidz, within Sierpc County, Masovian Voivodeship, in east-central Poland.
