= Kosemin =

- Village
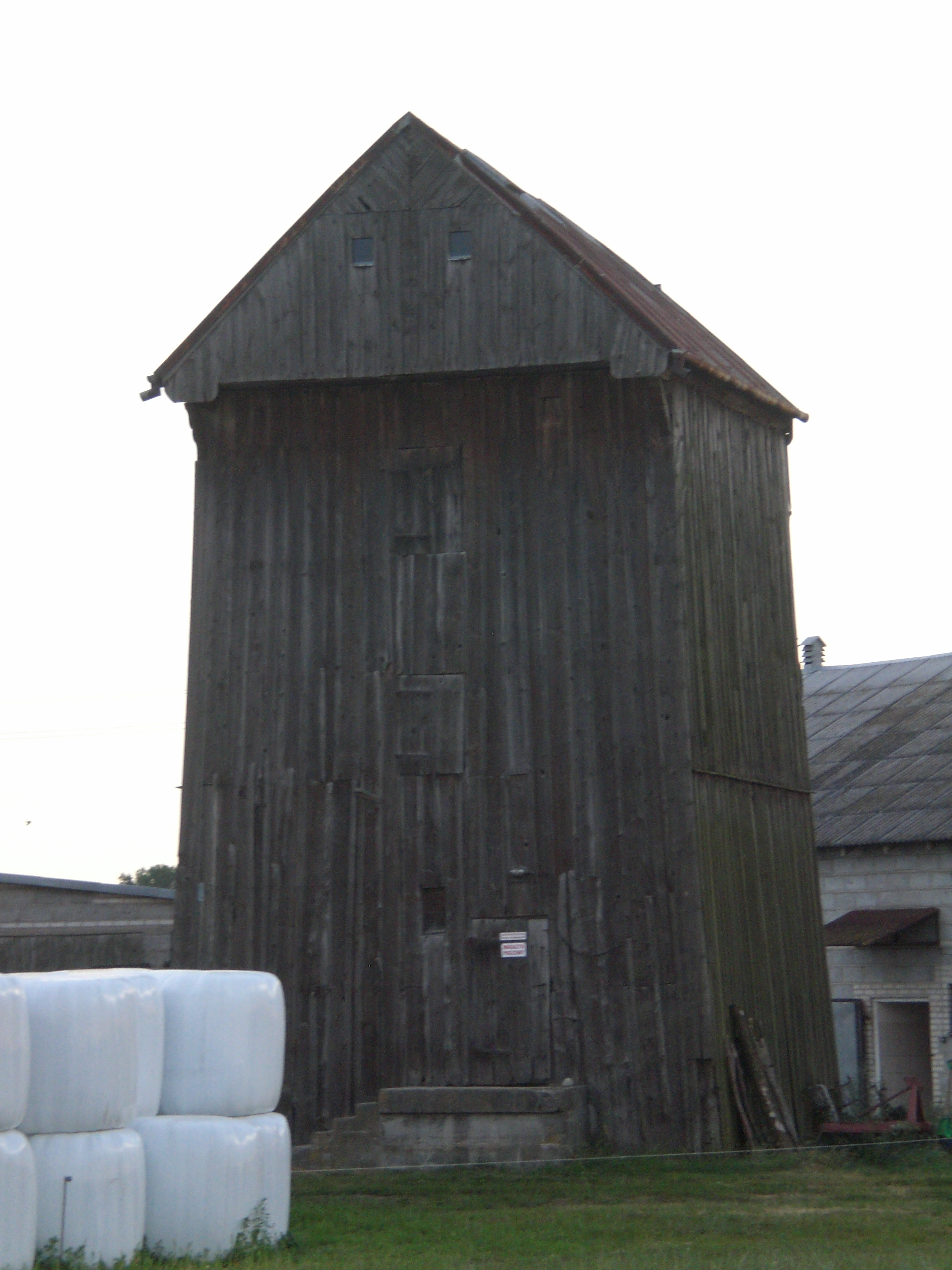

- Location within Poland
- Coordinates: 52°51′45″N 19°53′28″E
- Country: Poland
- Voivodeship: Masovian
- County: Sierpc
- Gmina: Zawidz

Population
  - Total: 290
- Time zone: UTC+1 (CET)
  - Summer (DST): UTC+2 (CEST)
- Vehicle registration: WSE

Kosemin [kɔˈsɛmin] is a village in the administrative district of Gmina Zawidz, within Sierpc County, Masovian Voivodeship, in north-central Poland.

Ten Polish citizens were murdered by Nazi Germany in the village during World War II.
