= Wola Grąbiecka =

- Village
- Location within Poland
- Coordinates: 52°50′16″N 19°46′48″E
- Country: Poland
- Voivodeship: Masovian
- County: Sierpc
- Gmina: Zawidz
- Population (approx.): 80

Wola Grąbiecka [ˈvɔla ɡrɔmˈbjɛt͡ska] is a village in the administrative district of Gmina Zawidz, within Sierpc County, Masovian Voivodeship, in east-central Poland.
