= Zglenice Małe =

- Village
- Location within Poland
- Coordinates: 52°47′11″N 19°36′26″E
- Country: Poland
- Voivodeship: Masovian
- County: Sierpc
- Gmina: Mochowo

Zglenice Małe [zɡlɛˈnit͡sɛ ˈmawɛ] is a village in the administrative district of Gmina Mochowo, within Sierpc County, Masovian Voivodeship, in east-central Poland.
