= Zamość, Sierpc County =

Zamość
- Village
- Location within Poland
- Coordinates: 52°53′N 19°47′E
- Country: Poland
- Voivodeship: Masovian
- County: Sierpc
- Gmina: Rościszewo

Zamość (Polish pronunciation: [ˈzamɔɕt͡ɕ]) is a village in the administrative district of Gmina Rościszewo, within Sierpc County, Masovian Voivodeship, in east-central Poland.
