= Modrzewie, Masovian Voivodeship =

Modrzewie
- Village
- Location within Poland
- Coordinates: 52°53′N 19°30′E
- Country: Poland
- Voivodeship: Masovian
- County: Sierpc
- Gmina: Szczutowo

Modrzewie (Polish pronunciation: [mɔdˈʐɛvjɛ]) is a village in the administrative district of Gmina Szczutowo, within Sierpc County, Masovian Voivodeship, in east-central Poland.
