= Babiec Rżały =

- Village
- Location within Poland
- Coordinates: 52°54′58″N 19°40′46″E
- Country: Poland
- Voivodeship: Masovian
- County: Sierpc
- Gmina: Rościszewo
- Time zone: UTC+1 (CET)
  - Summer (DST): UTC+2 (CEST)
- Vehicle registration: WSE

Babiec Rżały [ˈbabjɛt͡s ˈrʐawɨ] is a village in the administrative district of Gmina Rościszewo, within Sierpc County, Masovian Voivodeship, in north-central Poland.
