= Szumanie-Pejory =

- Village
- Location within Poland
- Coordinates: 52°47′34″N 19°52′48″E
- Country: Poland
- Voivodeship: Masovian
- County: Sierpc
- Gmina: Zawidz
- Population: 60

Szumanie-Pejory [ʂuˈmaɲɛ pɛˈjɔrɨ] is a village in the administrative district of Gmina Zawidz, within Sierpc County, Masovian Voivodeship, in east-central Poland.
