= Ostrowy, Gmina Zawidz =

Ostrowy
- Village
- Location within Poland
- Coordinates: 52°47′24″N 19°51′24″E
- Country: Poland
- Voivodeship: Masovian
- County: Sierpc
- Gmina: Zawidz

Ostrowy [ɔsˈtrɔvɨ] is a village in the administrative district of Gmina Zawidz, within Sierpc County, Masovian Voivodeship, in east-central Poland.
