= Słupia (disambiguation) =

The Słupia is a river in north-western Poland.

Słupia may also refer to:

- Słupia, Lesser Poland Voivodeship (south Poland)
- Słupia, Skierniewice County in Łodź Voivodeship (central Poland)
- Słupia, Busko County in Świętokrzyskie Voivodeship (south Poland)
- Słupia, Jędrzejów County in Świętokrzyskie Voivodeship (south Poland)
- Słupia, Końskie County in Świętokrzyskie Voivodeship (south-central Poland)
- Słupia, Gmina Szczutowo in Masovian Voivodeship (north-central Poland)
- Słupia, Gmina Zawidz in Masovian Voivodeship (north-central Poland)
- Słupia, Greater Poland Voivodeship (west-central Poland)
- Słupia, Pomeranian Voivodeship (north Poland)
