= Skoczkowo =

Skoczkowo may refer to the following places in Poland:

- Skoczkowo, Masovian Voivodeship
- Skoczkowo, Pomeranian Voivodeship
