= Ossegg =

Ossegg may refer to:

- German name of any of settlements named Osek, Czech Republic
- Kloster Ossegg, or Osek Monastery, Cistercian monastery in Osek in Ústí nad Labem Region, Czech Republic
- Georg Ossegg, Fictional archeologist from The Truth About Hansel and Gretel
