= Żuki, Masovian Voivodeship =

Żuki
- Village
- Location within Poland
- Coordinates: 52°46′41″N 19°35′34″E
- Country: Poland
- Voivodeship: Masovian
- County: Sierpc
- Gmina: Mochowo

Żuki [ˈʐukʲi] is a village in the administrative district of Gmina Mochowo, within Sierpc County, Masovian Voivodeship, in east-central Poland.
