= Żytowo, Masovian Voivodeship =

Żytowo
- Village
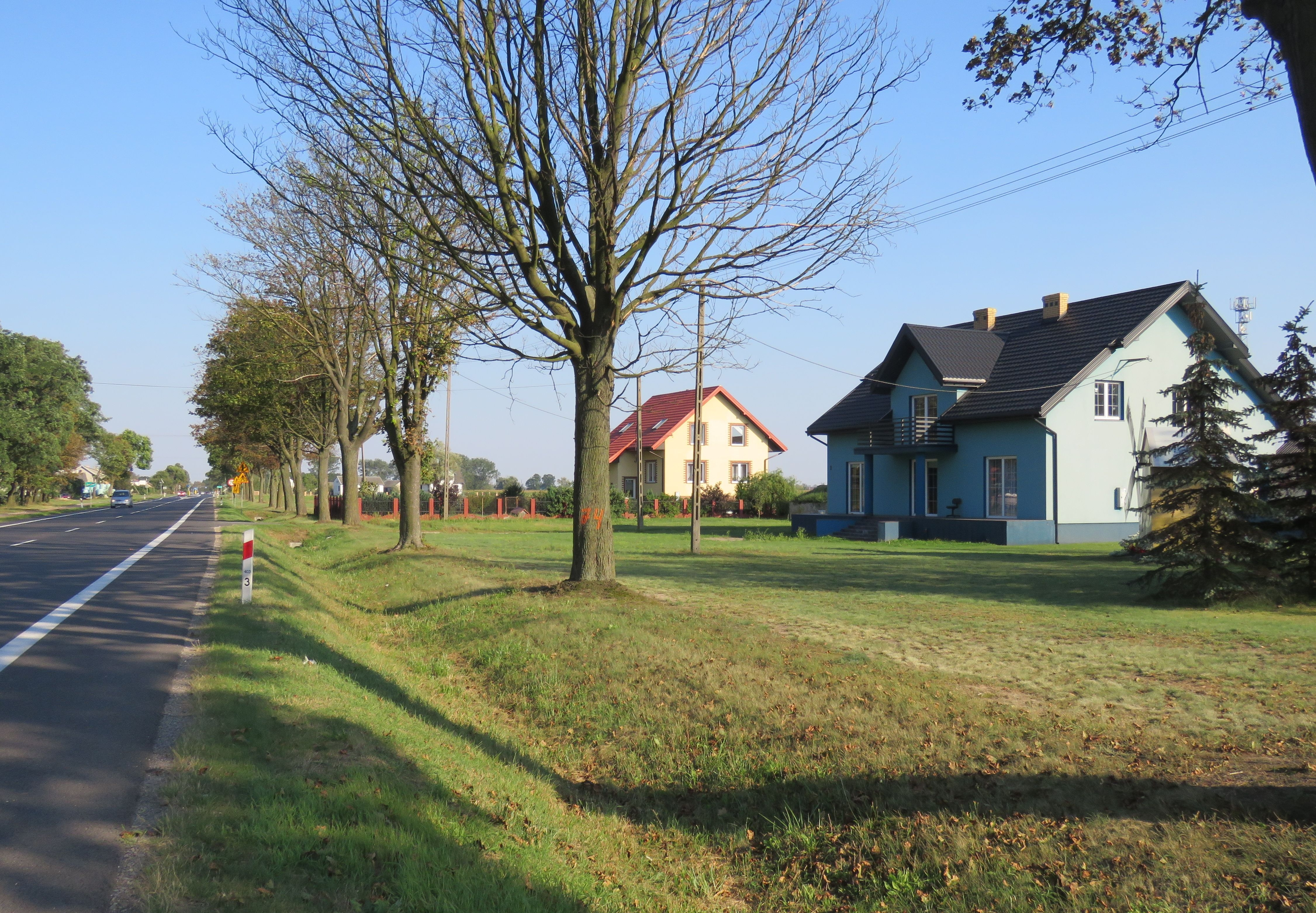

- Location within Poland
- Coordinates: 52°49′N 19°48′E
- Country: Poland
- Voivodeship: Masovian
- County: Sierpc
- Gmina: Zawidz

Żytowo [ʐɨˈtɔvɔ] is a village in the administrative district of Gmina Zawidz, within Sierpc County, Masovian Voivodeship, in east-central Poland.
