= Topiąca =

- Village
- Location within Poland
- Coordinates: 52°57′N 19°42′E
- Country: Poland
- Voivodeship: Masovian
- County: Sierpc
- Gmina: Rościszewo

Topiąca [tɔˈpjɔnt͡sa] is a village in the administrative district of Gmina Rościszewo, within Sierpc County, Masovian Voivodeship, in east-central Poland.
