= Blizno =

Blizno may refer to the following places:

- Blizno, Kuyavian-Pomeranian Voivodeship (north-central Poland)
- Blizno, Masovian Voivodeship (north-central Poland)
- Blizno, West Pomeranian Voivodeship (north-west Poland)
