= Babiec-Więczanki =

- Village
- Location within Poland
- Coordinates: 52°54′20″N 19°41′35″E
- Country: Poland
- Voivodeship: Masovian
- County: Sierpc
- Gmina: Rościszewo
- Time zone: UTC+1 (CET)
  - Summer (DST): UTC+2 (CEST)
- Vehicle registration: WSE

Babiec-Więczanki [ˈbabjɛt͡s vjɛnˈt͡ʂanki] is a village in the administrative district of Gmina Rościszewo, within Sierpc County, Masovian Voivodeship, in north-central Poland.
