= Stare Chabowo =

- Village
- Location within Poland
- Coordinates: 52°46′56″N 19°54′57″E
- Country: Poland
- Voivodeship: Masovian
- County: Sierpc
- Gmina: Zawidz

Stare Chabowo (Polish: [ˈstarɛ xaˈbɔvɔ]) is a village in the administrative district of Gmina Zawidz, within Sierpc County, Masovian Voivodeship, in east-central Poland.
