= Młotkowo-Wieś =

- Village
- Location within Poland
- Coordinates: 52°49′16″N 19°49′12″E
- Country: Poland
- Voivodeship: Masovian
- County: Sierpc
- Gmina: Zawidz

Młotkowo-Wieś [mwɔtˈkɔvɔ ˈvjɛɕ] is a village in the administrative district of Gmina Zawidz, within Sierpc County, Masovian Voivodeship, in east-central Poland.
