= Rekowo, Masovian Voivodeship =

Rekowo
- Village
- Location within Poland
- Coordinates: 52°48′N 19°48′E
- Country: Poland
- Voivodeship: Masovian
- County: Sierpc
- Gmina: Zawidz
- Population: 370

Rekowo [rɛˈkɔvɔ] is a village in the administrative district of Gmina Zawidz, within Sierpc County, Masovian Voivodeship, in east-central Poland.
