= Żabowo =

Żabowo may refer to the following places:

- Żabowo, Masovian Voivodeship (east-central Poland)
- Żabowo, Pomeranian Voivodeship (north Poland)
- Żabowo, West Pomeranian Voivodeship (north-west Poland)
