= Jaworowo-Kłódź =

Village in Gmina Zawidz, Poland

- Village
- Location within Poland
- Coordinates: 52°53′15″N 19°55′59″E
- Country: Poland
- Voivodeship: Masovian
- County: Sierpc
- Gmina: Zawidz

Jaworowo-Kłódź [javɔˈrɔvɔ ˈkwut͡ɕ] is a village in the administrative district of Gmina Zawidz, within Sierpc County, Masovian Voivodeship, in east-central Poland.
