= Milewko, Masovian Voivodeship =

Milewko
- Village
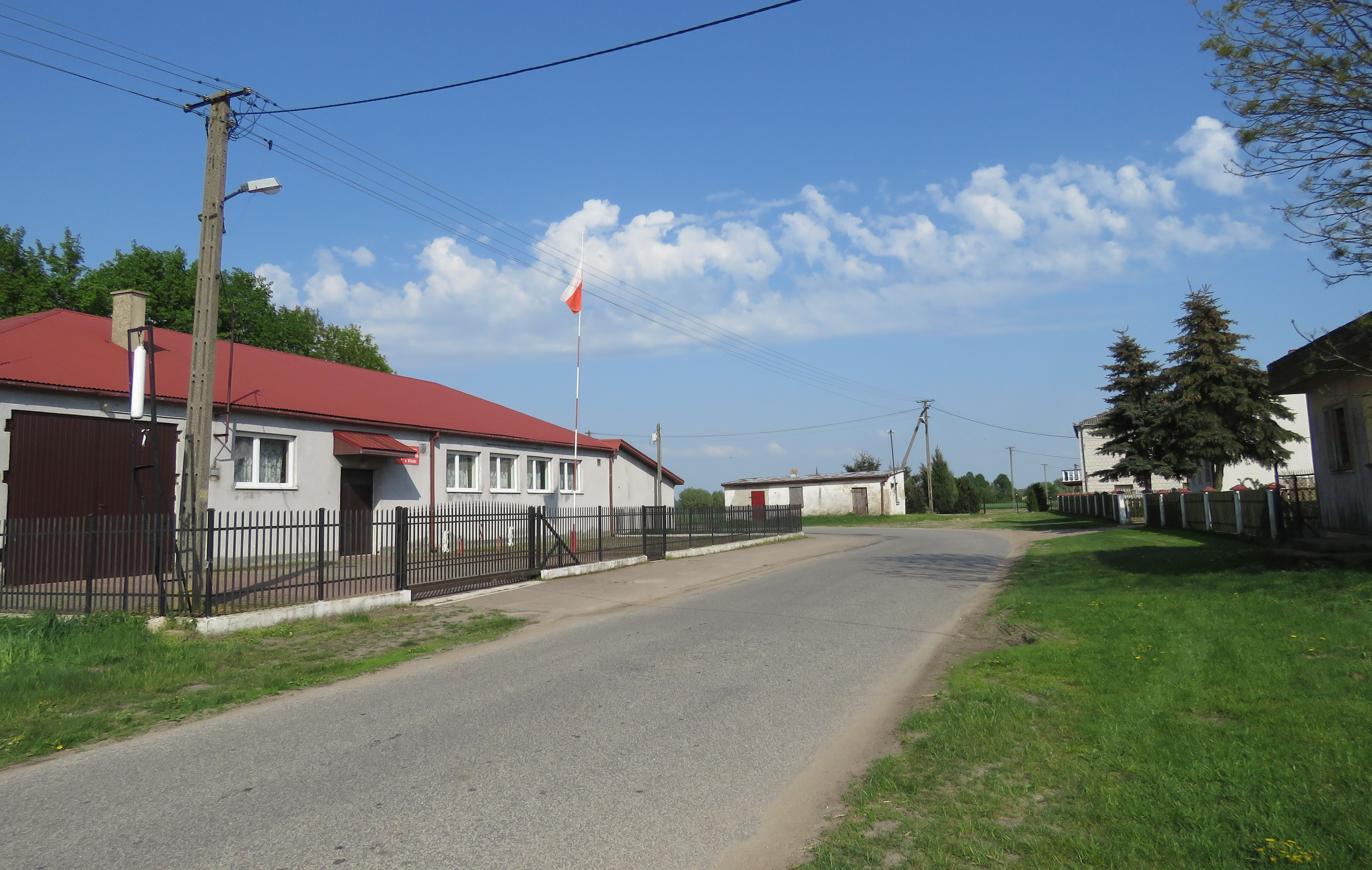

- Location within Poland
- Coordinates: 52°46′41″N 19°56′40″E
- Country: Poland
- Voivodeship: Masovian
- County: Sierpc
- Gmina: Zawidz

Milewko [miˈlɛfkɔ] is a village in the administrative district of Gmina Zawidz, within Sierpc County, Masovian Voivodeship, in east-central Poland.
