= Jarosław Wałęsa =

Polish politician (born 1976)

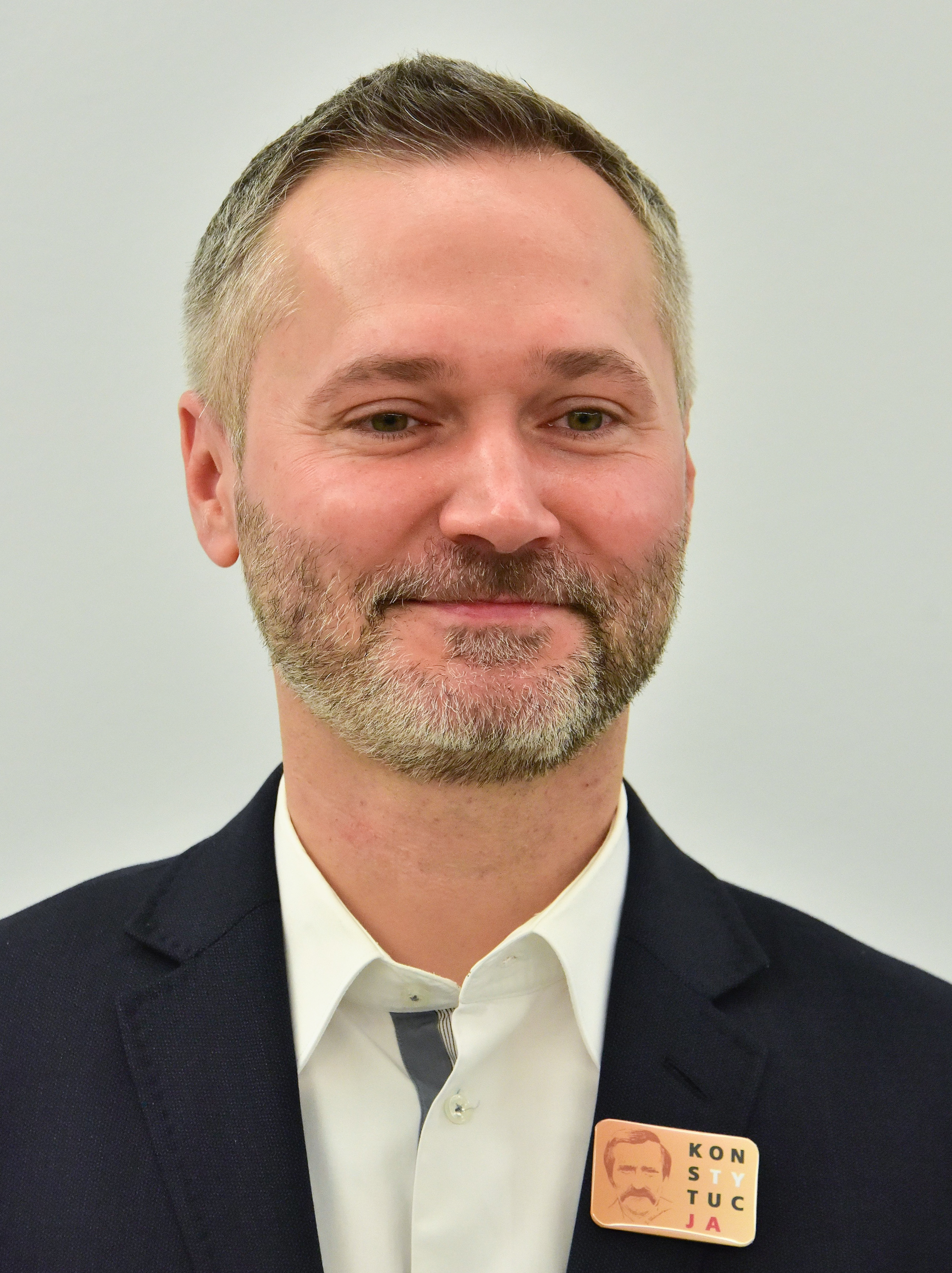
- Wałęsa in 2019

Member of the Sejm
- Incumbent
- Assumed office 12 November 2019
- In office 18 October 2005 – 10 June 2009
- Constituency: 25 – Gdańsk

Member of the European Parliament
- In office 7 June 2009 – 1 July 2019
- Constituency: 1 – Pomeranian

Personal details
- Born: 13 September 1976 (age 50) Gdańsk, Poland
- Party: Civic Platform
- Spouse: Ewelina Jachymek (m. 2012)
- Parent(s): Lech Wałęsa (father); Mirosława Danuta Gołoś (mother)
- Education: College of the Holy Cross (BA); University of Gdańsk (MA)
- Website: Official Website

Jarosław Leszek Wałęsa (pronounced [jaˈrɔswav vaˈwɛ̃sa]; born 13 September 1976) is a Polish politician. He was elected to the Sejm on 25 September 2005, getting 14,709 votes in 25 Gdańsk district as a candidate from the Civic Platform list. He is the son of former Polish President Lech Wałęsa.

== Early life and education ==
Wałęsa was born on 13 September 1976 in Gdańsk, Poland. He went to high school in his hometown, V Liceum Ogólnokształcące im. Stefana Żeromskiego w Gdańsku, during 1990–1994.

Wałęsa went to the United States and graduated in 1995 from Glastonbury High School in Connecticut, where he spent his last high school year as a foreign exchange student. He then attended the College of the Holy Cross in Worcester, Massachusetts, graduating with a Bachelor of Arts (B.A.) in political science in 2001. Wałęsa also attended the University of Gdańsk and received a Master of Arts (M.A.) in political science.

== Career ==
As a result of the European Parliament's election of June 2009, he became a member of the parliament. In 2014, he was re-elected.

Wałęsa became the director of the Civic Institute, said to be the research institute of Civic Platform, a Polish political party, on 16 June 2015.

== Personal life ==
He married Ewelina Jachymek in a civil ceremony in 2012, and in a convent in 2013. Their son Wiktor was born in March 2014, becoming the twelfth grandson of Lech Wałęsa. He lost his brother, Przemyslaw, Lech Wałęsa's third son, a border guard, who lived in the Morena district in Gdańsk, on 8 January 2017.

On 2 September 2011 Jarosław was injured seriously while riding his motorcycle after colliding with a SUV in Stropkowo near Sierpc. His injuries included a broken spine and dozens of fractures, and he was still undergoing corrective surgeries in July 2015.

== See also ==
- Members of Polish Sejm 2005-2007
