= Września, Masovian Voivodeship =

Września
- Village
- Location within Poland
- Coordinates: 52°56′47″N 19°45′56″E
- Country: Poland
- Voivodeship: Masovian
- County: Sierpc
- Gmina: Rościszewo

Września [ˈvʐɛɕɲa] is a village in the administrative district of Gmina Rościszewo, within Sierpc County, Masovian Voivodeship, in east-central Poland.
