= Grądy, Sierpc County =

Grądy
- Village
- Location within Poland
- Coordinates: 52°56′N 19°28′E
- Country: Poland
- Voivodeship: Masovian
- County: Sierpc
- Gmina: Szczutowo

Grądy [ˈɡrɔndɨ] is a village in the administrative district of Gmina Szczutowo, within Sierpc County, Masovian Voivodeship, in east-central Poland.
