= Mościska, Sierpc County =

Mościska
- Village
- Location within Poland
- Coordinates: 52°54′N 19°33′E
- Country: Poland
- Voivodeship: Masovian
- County: Sierpc
- Gmina: Szczutowo

Mościska [mɔɕˈt͡ɕiska] is a village in the administrative district of Gmina Szczutowo, within Sierpc County, Masovian Voivodeship, in east-central Poland.
