= Chabowo-Świniary =

Village in Gmina Zawidz, Poland

- Village
- Location within Poland
- Coordinates: 52°46′55″N 19°55′00″E
- Country: Poland
- Voivodeship: Masovian
- County: Sierpc
- Gmina: Zawidz

Chabowo-Świniary [xaˈbɔvɔ ɕfiˈɲarɨ] is a village in the administrative district of Gmina Zawidz, within Sierpc County, Masovian Voivodeship, in east-central Poland.
