= Jaworowo-Lipa =

- Village
- Location within Poland
- Coordinates: 52°54′04″N 19°53′59″E
- Country: Poland
- Voivodeship: Masovian
- County: Sierpc
- Gmina: Zawidz

Jaworowo-Lipa [javɔˈrɔvɔ ˈlipa] is a village in the administrative district of Gmina Zawidz, within Sierpc County, Masovian Voivodeship, in east-central Poland.
