= Stopin =

- Village
- Location within Poland
- Coordinates: 52°55′N 19°44′E
- Country: Poland
- Voivodeship: Masovian
- County: Sierpc
- Gmina: Rościszewo

Stopin [ˈstɔpin] is a village in the administrative district of Gmina Rościszewo, within Sierpc County, Masovian Voivodeship, in east-central Poland.
