= Jeżewo, Sierpc County =

Jeżewo
- Village
- Location within Poland
- Coordinates: 52°48′39″N 19°49′39″E
- Country: Poland
- Voivodeship: Masovian
- County: Sierpc
- Gmina: Zawidz
- Population: 290

Jeżewo [jɛˈʐɛvɔ] is a village in the administrative district of Gmina Zawidz, within Sierpc County, Masovian Voivodeship, in east-central Poland.
