= Adamowo, Sierpc County =

Adamowo
- Village
- Location within Poland
- Coordinates: 52°50′44″N 19°29′09″E
- Country: Poland
- Voivodeship: Masovian
- County: Sierpc
- Gmina: Mochowo

Adamowo [adaˈmɔvɔ] is a village in the administrative district of Gmina Mochowo, within Sierpc County, Masovian Voivodeship, in east-central Poland.
