= Jaworowo-Jastrzębie =

- Village
- Location within Poland
- Coordinates: 52°51′43″N 19°55′16″E
- Country: Poland
- Voivodeship: Masovian
- County: Sierpc
- Gmina: Zawidz
- Population: 80

Jaworowo-Jastrzębie [javɔˈrɔvɔ jasˈtʂɛmbjɛ] is a village in the administrative district of Gmina Zawidz, within Sierpc County, Masovian Voivodeship, in east-central Poland.
