= Nowe Kowalewo =

- Village
- Location within Poland
- Coordinates: 52°45′27″N 19°52′19″E
- Country: Poland
- Voivodeship: Masovian
- County: Sierpc
- Gmina: Zawidz

Nowe Kowalewo [ˈnɔvɛ kɔvaˈlɛvɔ] is a village in the administrative district of Gmina Zawidz, within Sierpc County, Masovian Voivodeship, in east-central Poland.
