= Petrykozy, Sierpc County =

Petrykozy
- Village
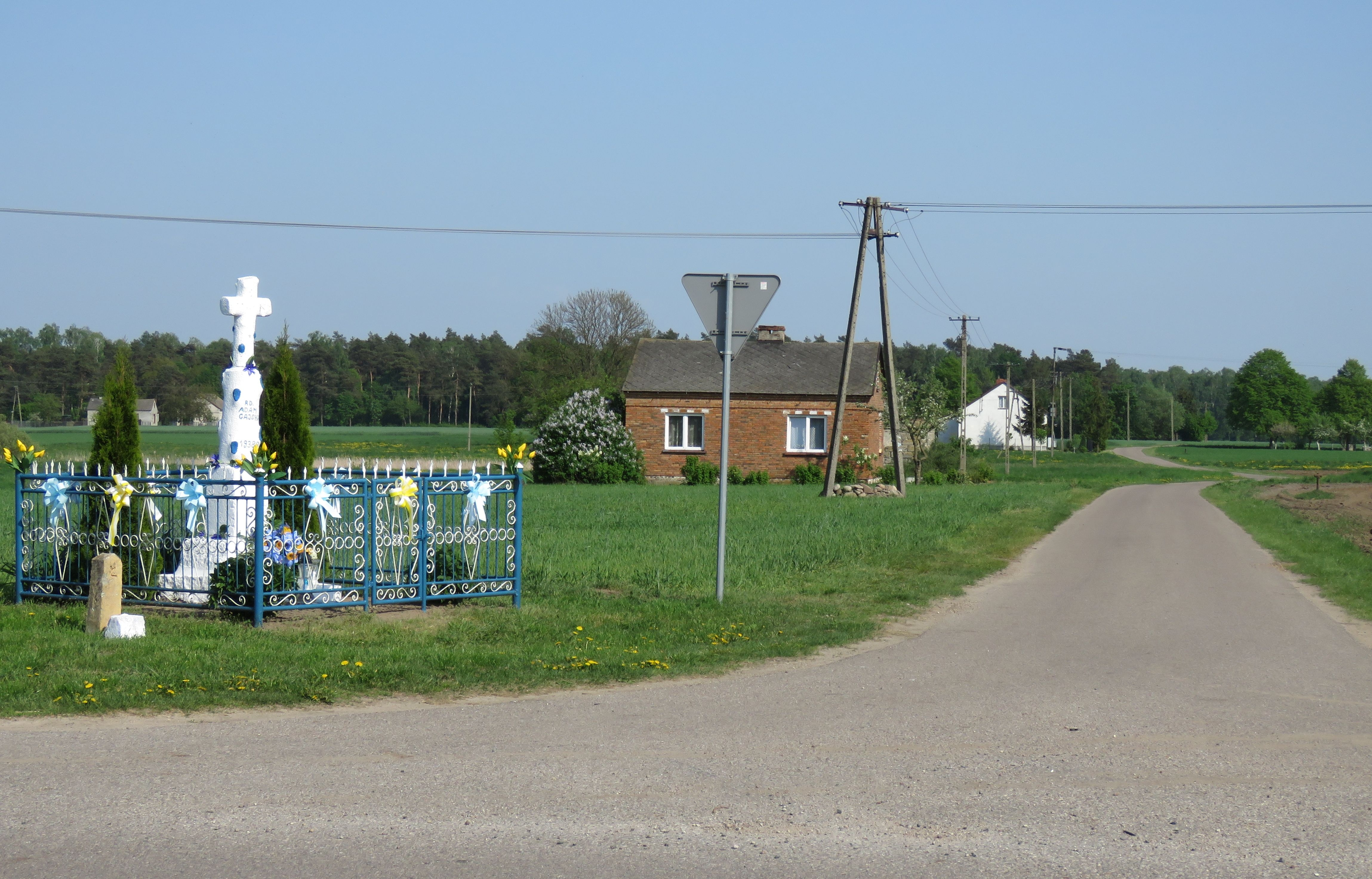
- Wayside cross in Petrykozy

- Location within Poland
- Coordinates: 52°46′23″N 19°52′25″E
- Country: Poland
- Voivodeship: Masovian
- County: Sierpc
- Gmina: Zawidz

Petrykozy [pɛtrɨˈkɔzɨ] is a village in the administrative district of Gmina Zawidz, within Sierpc County, Masovian Voivodeship, in east-central Poland.
