= Mańkowo, Sierpc County =

Village in Gmina Zawidz, Poland

Mańkowo
- Village
- Location within Poland
- Coordinates: 52°46′11″N 19°54′14″E
- Country: Poland
- Voivodeship: Masovian
- County: Sierpc
- Gmina: Zawidz
- Time zone: UTC+1 (CET)
  - Summer (DST): UTC+2 (CEST)

Mańkowo [maɲˈkɔvɔ] is a village in the administrative district of Gmina Zawidz, within Sierpc County, Masovian Voivodeship, in central Poland.
