= Florencja, Sierpc County =

Florencja
- Village
- Location within Poland
- Coordinates: 52°50′30″N 19°28′20″E
- Country: Poland
- Voivodeship: Masovian
- County: Sierpc
- Gmina: Mochowo
- Time zone: UTC+1 (CET)
  - Summer (DST): UTC+2 (CEST)
- Vehicle registration: WSE

Florencja (Polish pronunciation: [flɔˈrɛnt͡sja]) is a village in the administrative district of Gmina Mochowo, within Sierpc County, Masovian Voivodeship, in north-central Poland.

Two Polish citizens were murdered by Nazi Germany in the village during World War II.
