= Orłowo, Sierpc County =

Orłowo
- Village
- Location within Poland
- Coordinates: 52°46′30″N 19°50′44″E
- Country: Poland
- Voivodeship: Masovian
- County: Sierpc
- Gmina: Zawidz
- Population: 40

Orłowo [ɔrˈwɔvɔ] is a village in the administrative district of Gmina Zawidz, within Sierpc County, Masovian Voivodeship, in east-central Poland.
