= Grąbiec =

- Village
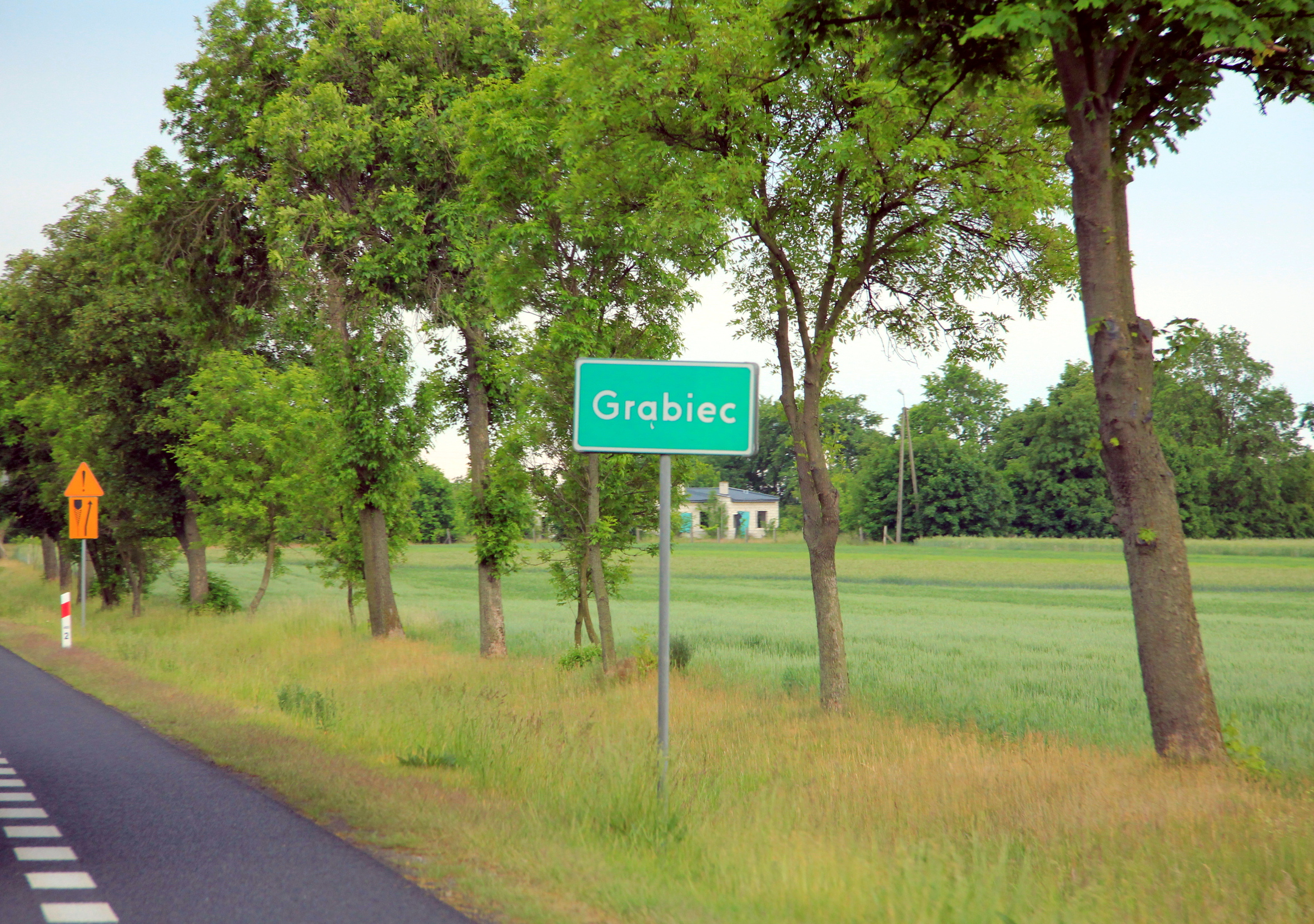

- Location within Poland
- Coordinates: 52°49′09″N 19°46′57″E
- Country: Poland
- Voivodeship: Masovian
- County: Sierpc
- Gmina: Zawidz

Grąbiec [ˈɡrɔmbjɛt͡s] is a village in the administrative district of Gmina Zawidz, within Sierpc County, Masovian Voivodeship, in east-central Poland.
