= Rzeszotary-Stara Wieś =

Village in Gmina Rościszewo, Poland

- Village
- Location within Poland
- Coordinates: 52°52′27″N 19°48′54″E
- Country: Poland
- Voivodeship: Masovian
- County: Sierpc
- Gmina: Rościszewo

Rzeszotary-Stara Wieś [ʐɛʂɔˈtarɨ ˈstara ˈvjɛɕ] is a village in the administrative district of Gmina Rościszewo, within Sierpc County, Masovian Voivodeship, in east-central Poland.
