= Józefowo, Sierpc County =

Józefowo
- Village
- Location within Poland
- Coordinates: 52°53′44″N 19°29′38″E
- Country: Poland
- Voivodeship: Masovian
- County: Sierpc
- Gmina: Szczutowo

Józefowo (Polish pronunciation: [juzɛˈfɔvɔ]) is a village in the administrative district of Gmina Szczutowo, within Sierpc County, Masovian Voivodeship, in east-central Poland.
