= Malanowo Stare =

- Village
- Location within Poland
- Coordinates: 52°47′N 19°31′E
- Country: Poland
- Voivodeship: Masovian
- County: Sierpc
- Gmina: Mochowo
- Time zone: UTC+1 (CET)
  - Summer (DST): UTC+2 (CEST)
- Vehicle registration: WSE

Malanowo Stare [malaˈnɔvɔ ˈstarɛ] is a village in the administrative district of Gmina Mochowo, within Sierpc County, Masovian Voivodeship, in north-central Poland.

Four Polish citizens were murdered by Nazi Germany in the village during World War II.
