= Osiek-Włostybory =

- Village
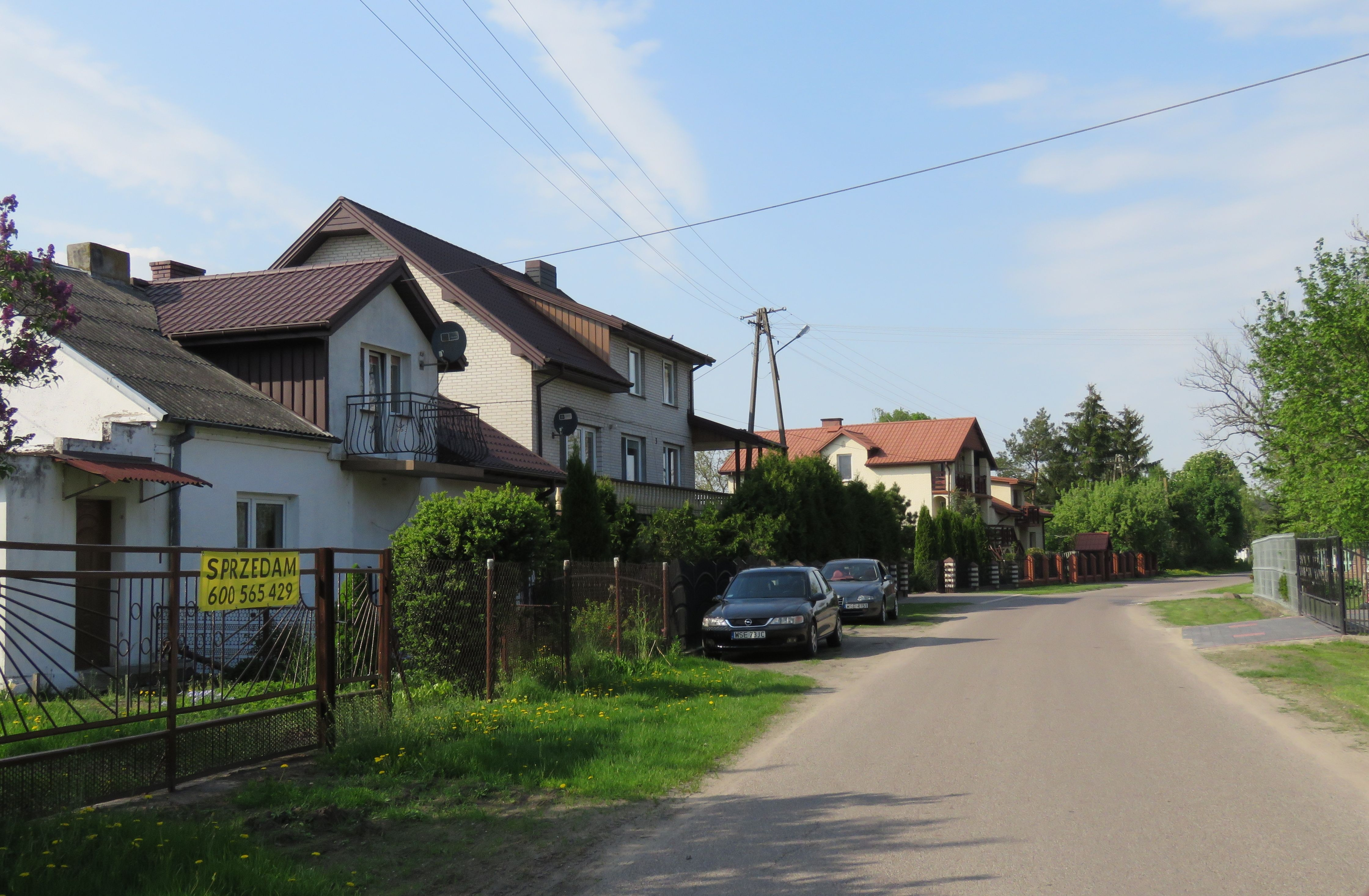

- Location within Poland
- Coordinates: 52°48′35″N 19°57′11″E
- Country: Poland
- Voivodeship: Masovian
- County: Sierpc
- Gmina: Zawidz

Osiek-Włostybory [ˈɔɕɛk vwɔstɨˈbɔrɨ] is a village in the administrative district of Gmina Zawidz, within Sierpc County, Masovian Voivodeship, in east-central Poland.
