= Rzeszotary-Chwały =

Village in Gmina Rościszewo, Poland

- Village
- Location within Poland
- Coordinates: 52°53′2″N 19°49′23″E
- Country: Poland
- Voivodeship: Masovian
- County: Sierpc
- Gmina: Rościszewo

Rzeszotary-Chwały [ʐɛʂɔˈtarɨ ˈxfawɨ] is a village in the administrative district of Gmina Rościszewo, within Sierpc County, Masovian Voivodeship, in east-central Poland.
