= Gutowo-Stradzyno =

- Village
- Location within Poland
- Coordinates: 52°44′38″N 19°51′13″E
- Country: Poland
- Voivodeship: Masovian
- County: Sierpc
- Gmina: Zawidz

Gutowo-Stradzyno [ɡuˈtɔvɔ straˈd͡zɨnɔ] is a village in the administrative district of Gmina Zawidz, within Sierpc County, Masovian Voivodeship, in east-central Poland.
