= Rzeszotary-Pszczele =

- Village
- Location within Poland
- Coordinates: 52°53′23″N 19°48′13″E
- Country: Poland
- Voivodeship: Masovian
- County: Sierpc
- Gmina: Rościszewo
- Population: 45

Rzeszotary-Pszczele [ʐɛʂɔˈtarɨ ˈpʂt͡ʂɛlɛ] is a village in the administrative district of Gmina Rościszewo, within Sierpc County, Masovian Voivodeship, in east-central Poland.
