= Zgagowo-Wieś =

- Village
- Location within Poland
- Coordinates: 52°50′52″N 19°50′21″E
- Country: Poland
- Voivodeship: Masovian
- County: Sierpc
- Gmina: Zawidz

Zgagowo-Wieś [zɡaˈɡɔvɔ ˈvjɛɕ] is a village in the administrative district of Gmina Zawidz, within Sierpc County, Masovian Voivodeship, in east-central Poland.
