= Milewo, Sierpc County =

Milewo
- Village
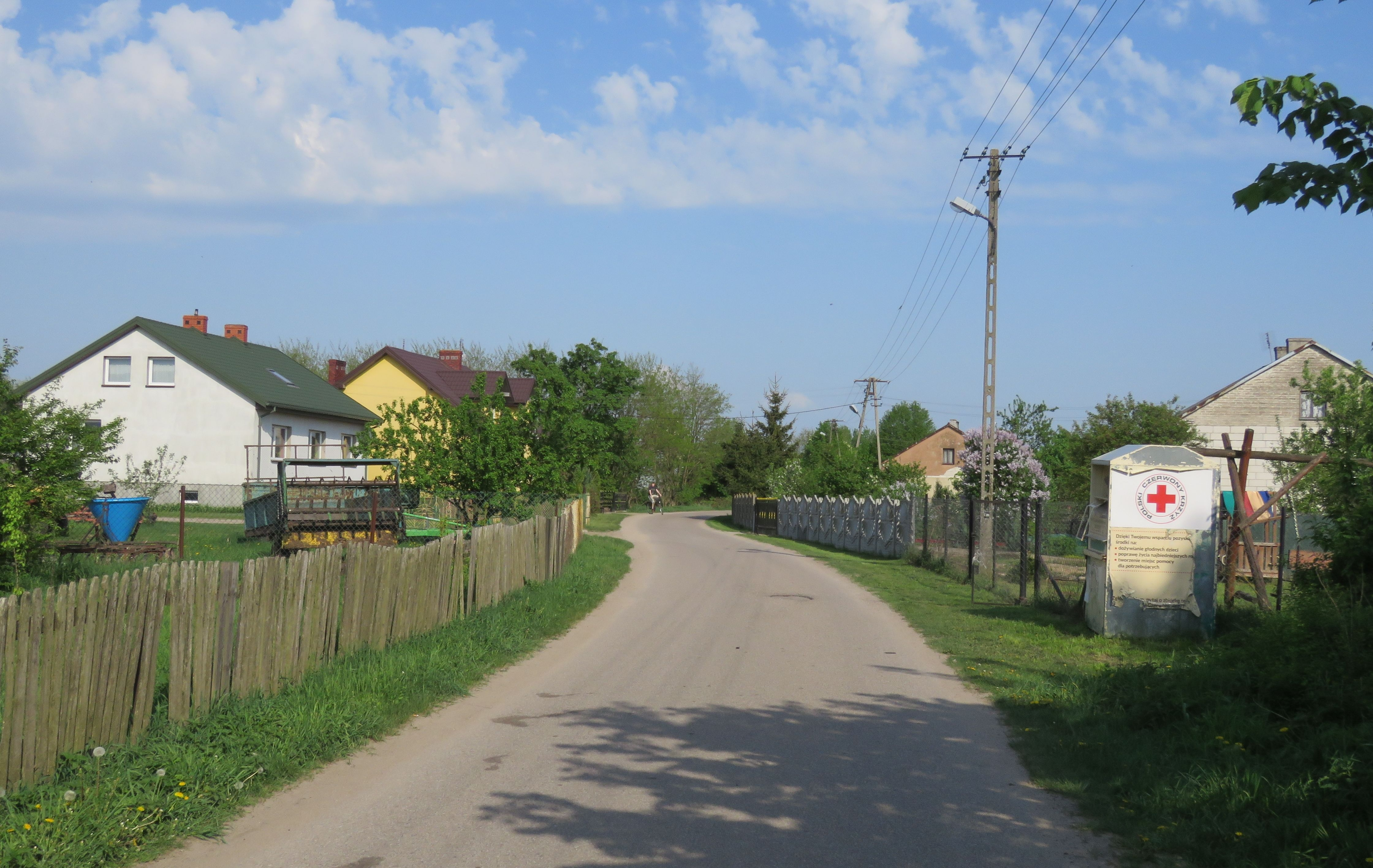
- Road in Milewo

- Location within Poland
- Coordinates: 52°47′16″N 19°57′10″E
- Country: Poland
- Voivodeship: Masovian
- County: Sierpc
- Gmina: Zawidz

Milewo [miˈlɛvɔ] is a village in the administrative district of Gmina Zawidz, within Sierpc County, Masovian Voivodeship, in east-central Poland.
