= Ligowo =

- Village
- Location within Poland
- Coordinates: 52°49′N 19°29′E
- Country: Poland
- Voivodeship: Masovian
- County: Sierpc
- Gmina: Mochowo
- Elevation: 46 m (151 ft)
- Population: 460

Ligowo [liˈɡɔvɔ] is a village in the administrative district of Gmina Mochowo, within Sierpc County, Masovian Voivodeship, in east-central Poland.
