= Gołocin, Masovian Voivodeship =

Gołocin
- Village
- Location within Poland
- Coordinates: 52°44′05″N 19°50′01″E
- Country: Poland
- Voivodeship: Masovian
- County: Sierpc
- Gmina: Zawidz

Gołocin [ɡɔˈwɔt͡ɕin] is a village in the administrative district of Gmina Zawidz, within Sierpc County, Masovian Voivodeship, in east-central Poland.
