= Cisse, Poland =

Cisse
- Village
- Location within Poland
- Coordinates: 52°55′N 19°34′E
- Country: Poland
- Voivodeship: Masovian
- County: Sierpc
- Gmina: Szczutowo
- Population: 185

Cisse [ˈt͡ɕissɛ] is a village in the administrative district of Gmina Szczutowo, within Sierpc County, Masovian Voivodeship, in east-central Poland.
