= Żabowo, Masovian Voivodeship =

Żabowo
- Village
- Location within Poland
- Coordinates: 52°49′N 19°54′E
- Country: Poland
- Voivodeship: Masovian
- County: Sierpc
- Gmina: Zawidz
- Population: 150

Żabowo [ʐaˈbɔvɔ] is a village in the administrative district of Gmina Zawidz, within Sierpc County, Masovian Voivodeship, in east-central Poland.
