= Słupia, Gmina Zawidz =

Słupia
- Village
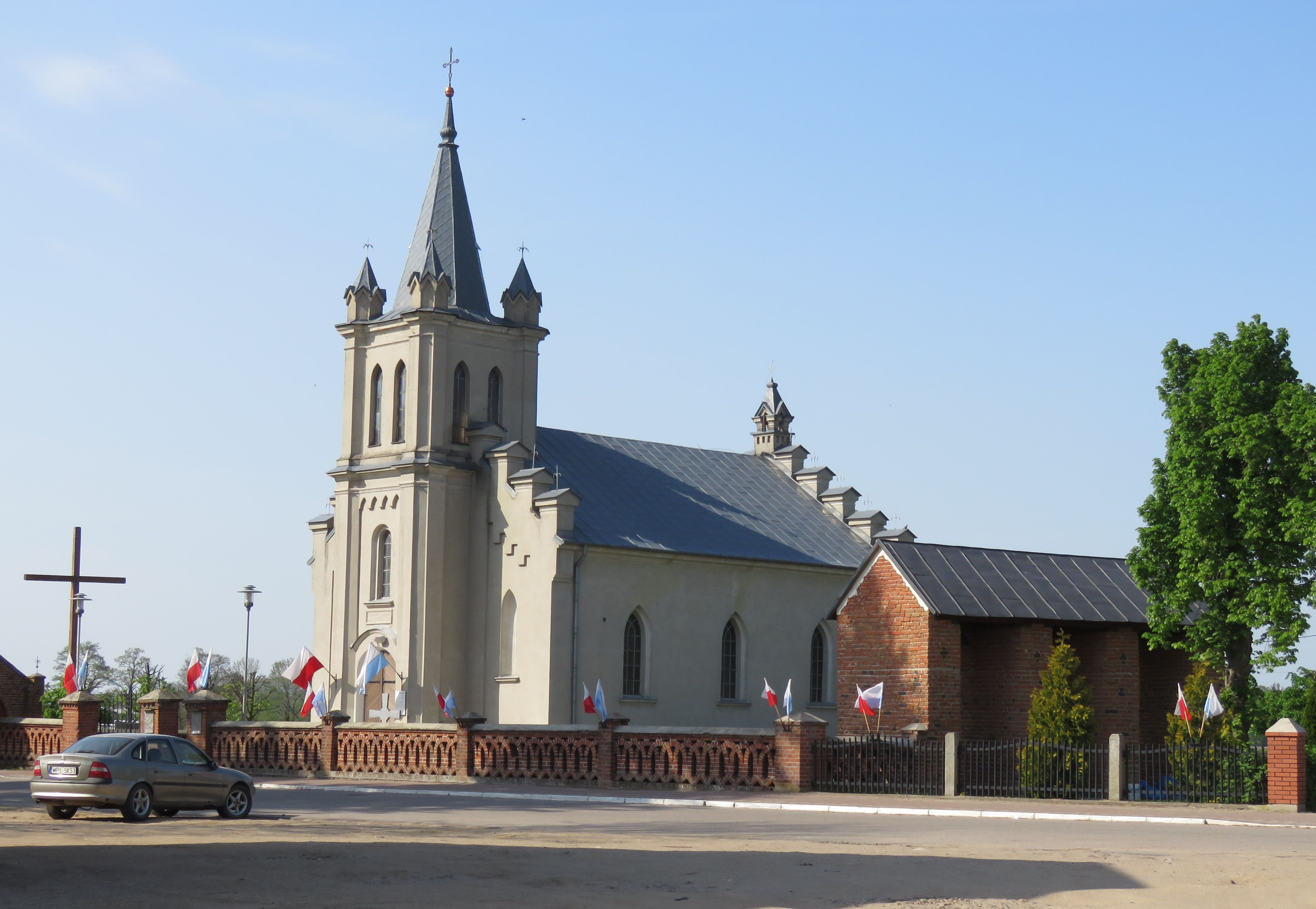
- Saint James the Greater church in Słupia

- Location within Poland
- Coordinates: 52°45′37″N 19°51′16″E
- Country: Poland
- Voivodeship: Masovian
- County: Sierpc
- Gmina: Zawidz
- Time zone: UTC+1 (CET)
  - Summer (DST): UTC+2 (CEST)
- Vehicle registration: WSE

Słupia [ˈswupja] is a village in the administrative district of Gmina Zawidz, within Sierpc County, Masovian Voivodeship, in north-central Poland.

Four Polish citizens were murdered by Nazi Germany in the village during World War II.
