= Szczutowo, Masovian Voivodeship =

Szczutowo
- Village
- Location within Poland
- Coordinates: 52°56′N 19°35′E
- Country: Poland
- Voivodeship: Masovian
- County: Sierpc
- Gmina: Szczutowo

Szczutowo [ʂt͡ʂuˈtɔvɔ] is a village in Sierpc County, Masovian Voivodeship, in east-central Poland. It is the seat of the gmina (administrative district) called Gmina Szczutowo.
