= Rościszewo, Masovian Voivodeship =

Rościszewo
- Village
- Gmina office

- Location within Poland
- Coordinates: 52°54′N 19°47′E
- Country: Poland
- Voivodeship: Masovian
- County: Sierpc
- Gmina: Rościszewo
- Time zone: UTC+1 (CET)
  - Summer (DST): UTC+2 (CEST)
- Vehicle registration: WSE

Rościszewo [rɔɕt͡ɕiˈʂɛvɔ] is a village in Sierpc County, Masovian Voivodeship, in north-central Poland. It is the seat of the gmina (administrative district) called Gmina Rościszewo.
