= Gmina Mochowo =

Gmina Mochowo Mochowo Commune
- Gmina
- Coat of arms
- Interactive map of Gmina Mochowo
- Coordinates (Mochowo): 52°46′N 19°34′E
- Country: Poland
- Voivodeship: Masovian
- County: Sierpc
- Seat: Mochowo

Area
  - Total: 143.57 km^{2} (55.43 sq mi)

Population (2006)
  - Total: 6,249
  - Density: 43.53/km^{2} (112.7/sq mi)
- Time zone: UTC+1 (CET)
  - Summer (DST): UTC+2 (CEST)
- Vehicle registration: WSE
- Website: http://www.mochowo.bazagmin.pl

Gmina Mochowo is a rural gmina (administrative district) in Sierpc County, Masovian Voivodeship, in north-central Poland. Its seat is the village of Mochowo, which lies approximately 12 kilometres (7 mi) south-west of Sierpc and 115 km (71 mi) north-west of Warsaw.

The gmina covers an area of 143.57 square kilometres (55.4 sq mi), and as of 2006 its total population is 6,249.

== Villages ==
Gmina Mochowo contains the villages and settlements of Adamowo, Bendorzyn, Bożewo, Bożewo Nowe, Choczeń, Cieślin, Dobaczewo, Dobrzenice Małe, Florencja, Gozdy, Grabówiec, Grodnia, Kapuśniki, Kokoszczyn, Ligówko, Ligowo, Lisice Nowe, Łukoszyn, Łukoszyno-Biki, Malanówko, Malanowo Nowe, Malanowo Stare, Mochowo, Mochowo-Dobrzenice, Mochowo-Parcele, Myszki, Obręb, Osiek, Rokicie, Romatowo, Śniechy, Sulkowo Rzeczne, Sulkowo-Bariany, Żabiki, Załszyn, Zglenice Duże, Zglenice Małe, Zglenice-Budy, Żółtowo, Żuki, Żurawin and Żurawinek.

== Neighbouring gminas ==
Gmina Mochowo is bordered by the gminas of Brudzeń Duży, Gozdowo, Sierpc, Skępe and Tłuchowo.
