= Gmina Rościszewo =

Gmina Rościszewo Rościszewo Commune
- Gmina
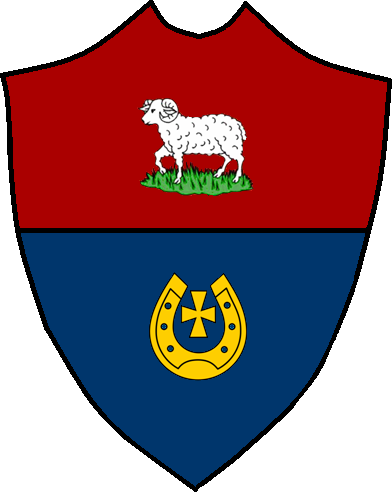
- Coat of arms
- Interactive map of Gmina Rościszewo
- Coordinates (Rościszewo): 52°54′N 19°47′E
- Country: Poland
- Voivodeship: Masovian
- County: Sierpc
- Seat: Rościszewo

Area
  - Total: 115.08 km^{2} (44.43 sq mi)

Population (2006)
  - Total: 4,216
  - Density: 36.64/km^{2} (94.89/sq mi)
- Time zone: UTC+1 (CET)
  - Summer (DST): UTC+2 (CEST)
- Vehicle registration: WSE

Gmina Rościszewo is a rural gmina (administrative district) in Sierpc County, Masovian Voivodeship, in north-central Poland. Its seat is the village of Rościszewo, which lies approximately 9 kilometres (5 mi) north-east of Sierpc and 112 km (69 mi) north-west of Warsaw

The gmina covers an area of 115.08 square kilometres (44.4 sq mi), and as of 2006 its total population is 4,216.

== Villages ==
Gmina Rościszewo contains the villages and settlements of Babiec Piaseczny, Babiec Rżały, Babiec-Więczanki, Borowo, Bryski, Komorowo, Kownatka, Kuski, Lipniki, Łukomie, Łukomie-Kolonia, Nowe Rościszewo, Nowy Zamość, Ostrów, Pianki, Polik, Puszcza, Rościszewo, Rumunki-Chwały, Rzeszotary-Chwały, Rzeszotary-Gortaty, Rzeszotary-Pszczele, Rzeszotary-Stara Wieś, Rzeszotary-Zawady, Śniedzanowo, Stopin, Topiąca, Września and Zamość.

== Neighbouring gminas ==
Gmina Rościszewo is bordered by the town of Sierpc and by the gminas of Bieżuń, Lutocin, Sierpc, Skrwilno, Szczutowo and Zawidz.
