= Gmina Zawidz =

Gmina Zawidz Zawidz Commune
- Gmina
- Coat of arms
- Interactive map of Gmina Zawidz
- Coordinates (Zawidz): 52°49′N 19°52′E
- Country: Poland
- Voivodeship: Masovian
- County: Sierpc
- Seat: Zawidz

Area
  - Total: 186.09 km^{2} (71.85 sq mi)

Population (2006)
  - Total: 6,956
  - Density: 37.38/km^{2} (96.81/sq mi)
- Time zone: UTC+1 (CET)
  - Summer (DST): UTC+2 (CEST)
- Vehicle registration: WSE
- Website: http://www.zawidz.pl/

Gmina Zawidz is a rural gmina (administrative district) in Sierpc County, Masovian Voivodeship, in north-central Poland. Its seat is the village of Zawidz, which lies approximately 16 kilometres (10 mi) south-east of Sierpc and 102 km (63 mi) north-west of Warsaw.

The gmina covers an area of 186.09 square kilometres (71.8 sq mi), and as of 2006 its total population is 6,956.

== Villages ==
Gmina Zawidz contains the villages and settlements of Budy Milewskie, Budy Piaseczne, Chabowo-Świniary, Gołocin, Grąbiec, Grabowo, Gutowo-Górki, Gutowo-Stradzyno, Jaworowo-Jastrzębie, Jaworowo-Kłódź, Jaworowo-Kolonia, Jaworowo-Lipa, Jeżewo, Kęsice, Kosemin, Kosmaczewo, Krajewice Duże, Krajewice Małe, Majki, Majki Duże, Majki Małe, Makomazy, Mańkowo, Milewko, Milewo, Młotkowo-Kolonia, Młotkowo-Wieś, Nowe Kowalewo, Nowe Zgagowo, Orłowo, Osiek, Osiek Piaseczny, Osiek-Parcele, Osiek-Włostybory, Ostrowy, Petrykozy, Rekowo, Schabajewo, Skoczkowo, Słupia, Stare Chabowo, Stropkowo, Szumanie, Szumanie-Pejory, Szumanie-Pustoły, Wola Grąbiecka, Żabowo, Zalesie, Zawidz, Zawidz Mały, Zgagowo-Wieś and Żytowo.

== Neighbouring gminas ==
Gmina Zawidz is bordered by the gminas of Bielsk, Bieżuń, Drobin, Gozdowo, Raciąż, Rościszewo, Siemiątkowo and Sierpc.
