= Zawidz Kościelny =

- Village
- Gmina office

- Location within Poland
- Coordinates: 52°49′N 19°52′E
- Country: Poland
- Voivodeship: Masovian
- County: Sierpc
- Gmina: Zawidz

Population
  - Total: 900
- Time zone: UTC+1 (CET)
  - Summer (DST): UTC+2 (CEST)
- Vehicle registration: WSE

Zawidz Kościelny [ˈzavit͡s] is a village in Sierpc County, Masovian Voivodeship, in north-central Poland. It is the seat of the gmina (administrative district) called Gmina Zawidz.

Four Polish citizens were murdered by Nazi Germany in the village during World War II.
