= Mochowo =

- Village
- Location within Poland
- Coordinates: 52°46′N 19°34′E
- Country: Poland
- Voivodeship: Masovian
- County: Sierpc
- Gmina: Mochowo
- Population: 310

Mochowo [mɔˈxɔvɔ] is a village in Sierpc County, Masovian Voivodeship, in east-central Poland. It is the seat of the gmina (administrative district) called Gmina Mochowo.
