= Osiek, Gmina Zawidz =

Osiek
- Village
- Location within Poland
- Coordinates: 52°48′46″N 19°56′16″E
- Country: Poland
- Voivodeship: Masovian
- County: Sierpc
- Gmina: Zawidz

Osiek [ˈɔɕɛk] is a village in the administrative district of Gmina Zawidz, within Sierpc County, Masovian Voivodeship, in east-central Poland.
