= Skoczkowo, Masovian Voivodeship =

Skoczkowo
- Village
- Location within Poland
- Coordinates: 52°51′N 19°50′E
- Country: Poland
- Voivodeship: Masovian
- County: Sierpc
- Gmina: Zawidz

Skoczkowo [skɔt͡ʂˈkɔvɔ] is a village in the administrative district of Gmina Zawidz, within Sierpc County, Masovian Voivodeship, in east-central Poland.
