= Gmina Szczutowo =

Gmina Szczutowo Szczutowo Commune
- Gmina
- Coat of arms
- Interactive map of Gmina Szczutowo
- Coordinates (Szczutowo): 52°56′N 19°35′E
- Country: Poland
- Voivodeship: Masovian
- County: Sierpc
- Seat: Szczutowo

Area
  - Total: 112.62 km^{2} (43.48 sq mi)

Population (2006)
  - Total: 4,417
  - Density: 39.22/km^{2} (101.6/sq mi)
- Time zone: UTC+1 (CET)
  - Summer (DST): UTC+2 (CEST)
- Vehicle registration: WSE

Gmina Szczutowo is a rural gmina (administrative district) in Sierpc County, Masovian Voivodeship, in north-central Poland. Its seat is the village of Szczutowo, which lies approximately 11 kilometres (7 mi) north-west of Sierpc and 125 km (78 mi) north-west of Warsaw.

The gmina covers an area of 112.62 square kilometres (43.5 sq mi), and as of 2006 its total population is 4,417.

== Villages ==
Gmina Szczutowo contains the villages and settlements of Agnieszkowo, Białasy, Blinno, Blizno, Całownia, Cisse, Dąbkowa Parowa, Dziki Bór, Gójsk, Gorzeń, Grabal, Grądy, Gugoły, Jaźwiny, Józefowo, Karlewo, Łazy, Maluszyn, Mierzęcin, Modrzewie, Mościska, Podlesie, Słupia, Stara Wola, Szczechowo and Szczutowo.

== Neighbouring gminas ==
Gmina Szczutowo is bordered by the gminas of Rogowo, Rościszewo, Sierpc, Skępe and Skrwilno.
