= Blizno, Masovian Voivodeship =

Blizno
- Village
- Saint Lawrence church in Blizno

- Location within Poland
- Coordinates: 52°56′N 19°35′E
- Country: Poland
- Voivodeship: Masovian
- County: Sierpc
- Gmina: Szczutowo
- Time zone: UTC+1 (CET)
  - Summer (DST): UTC+2 (CEST)
- Vehicle registration: WSE

Blizno [ˈbliznɔ] is a village in the administrative district of Gmina Szczutowo, within Sierpc County, Masovian Voivodeship, in north-central Poland.

Three Polish citizens were murdered by Nazi Germany in the village during World War II.
