= Osek (Jičín District) =

Municipality in the Czech Republic

- Municipality
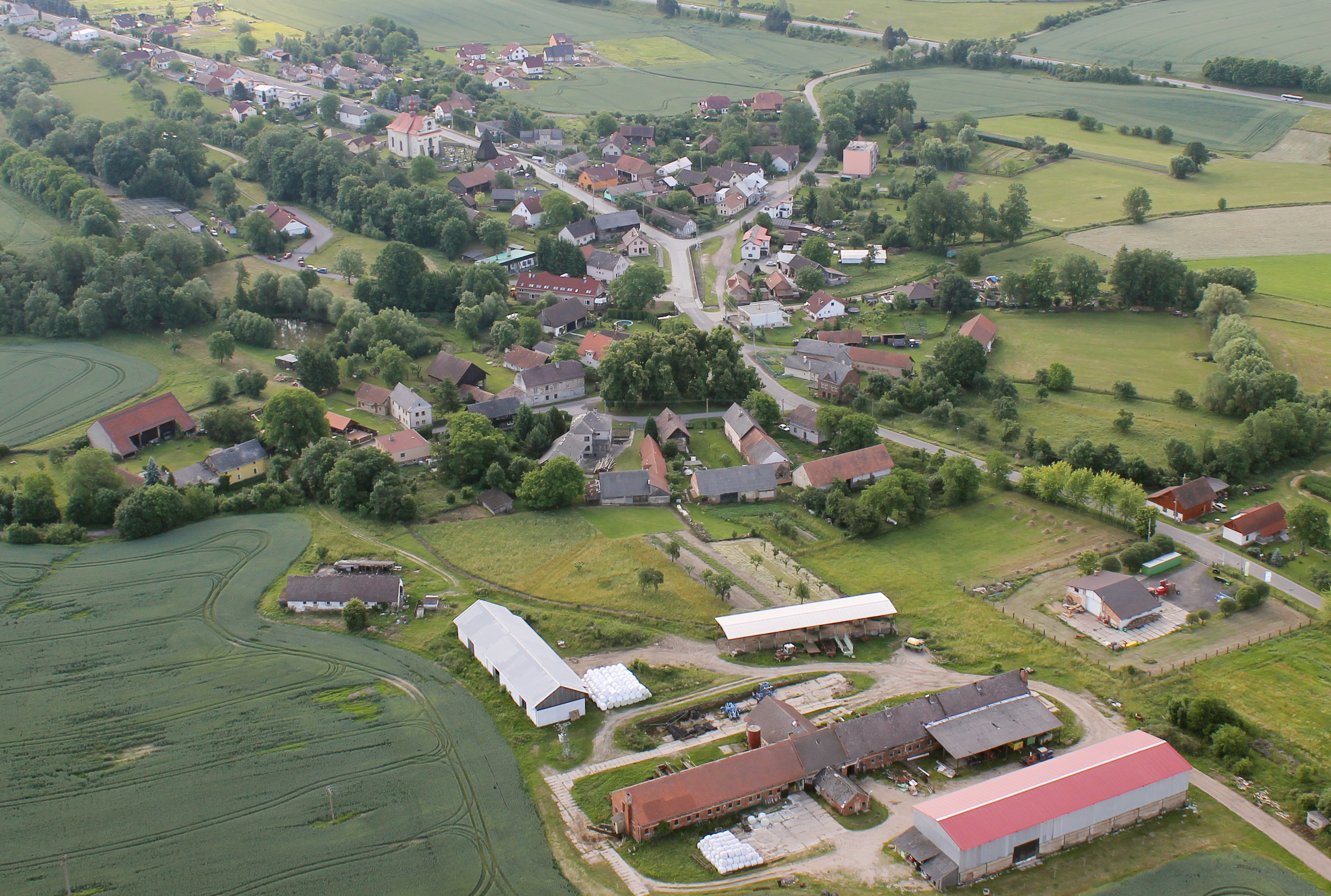
- Aerial view

- Location in the Czech Republic
- Coordinates: 50°27′50″N 15°9′35″E
- Country: Czech Republic
- Region: Hradec Králové
- District: Jičín
- First mentioned: 1360

Area
  - Total: 3.82 km^{2} (1.47 sq mi)
- Elevation: 254 m (833 ft)

Population (2026-01-01)
  - Total: 251
  - Density: 65.7/km^{2} (170/sq mi)
- Time zone: UTC+1 (CET)
  - Summer (DST): UTC+2 (CEST)
- Postal code: 507 43
- Website: osekusobotky.cz

Osek is a municipality and village in Jičín District in the Hradec Králové Region of the Czech Republic. It has about 300 inhabitants.

== Demographics ==
Historical population
Year	Pop.	±%
1869	284	—
1880	331	+16.5%
1890	310	−6.3%
1900	301	−2.9%
1910	303	+0.7%
1921	333	+9.9%
1930	323	−3.0%
1950	245	−24.1%
1961	234	−4.5%
1970	206	−12.0%
1980	214	+3.9%
1991	160	−25.2%
2001	146	−8.8%
2011	193	+32.2%
2021	228	+18.1%
Source: Censuses

== History ==
The first written mention of Osek is from 1360.
