= Piaseczno (disambiguation) =

Piaseczno may refer to the following places:

- Piaseczno, Lipno County in Kuyavian-Pomeranian Voivodeship (north-central Poland)
- Piaseczno, Sępólno County in Kuyavian-Pomeranian Voivodeship (north-central Poland)
- Piaseczno in Masovian Voivodeship (east-central Poland)
- Piaseczno, Lublin Voivodeship (east Poland)
- Piaseczno, Świętokrzyskie Voivodeship (south-central Poland)
- Piaseczno, Grójec County in Masovian Voivodeship (east-central Poland)
- Piaseczno, Mińsk County in Masovian Voivodeship (east-central Poland)
- Piaseczno, Radom County in Masovian Voivodeship (east-central Poland)
- Piaseczno, Silesian Voivodeship (south Poland)
- Piaseczno, Słupsk County in Pomeranian Voivodeship (north Poland)
- Piaseczno, Tczew County in Pomeranian Voivodeship (north Poland)
- Piaseczno, Bartoszyce County in Warmian-Masurian Voivodeship (north Poland)
- Piaseczno, Działdowo County in Warmian-Masurian Voivodeship (north Poland)
- Piaseczno, Choszczno County in West Pomeranian Voivodeship (north-west Poland)
- Piaseczno, Drawsko County in West Pomeranian Voivodeship (north-west Poland)
- Piaseczno, Gmina Banie in West Pomeranian Voivodeship (north-west Poland)
- Piaseczno, Gmina Trzcińsko-Zdrój in West Pomeranian Voivodeship (north-west Poland)
