= Řenče =

- Municipality
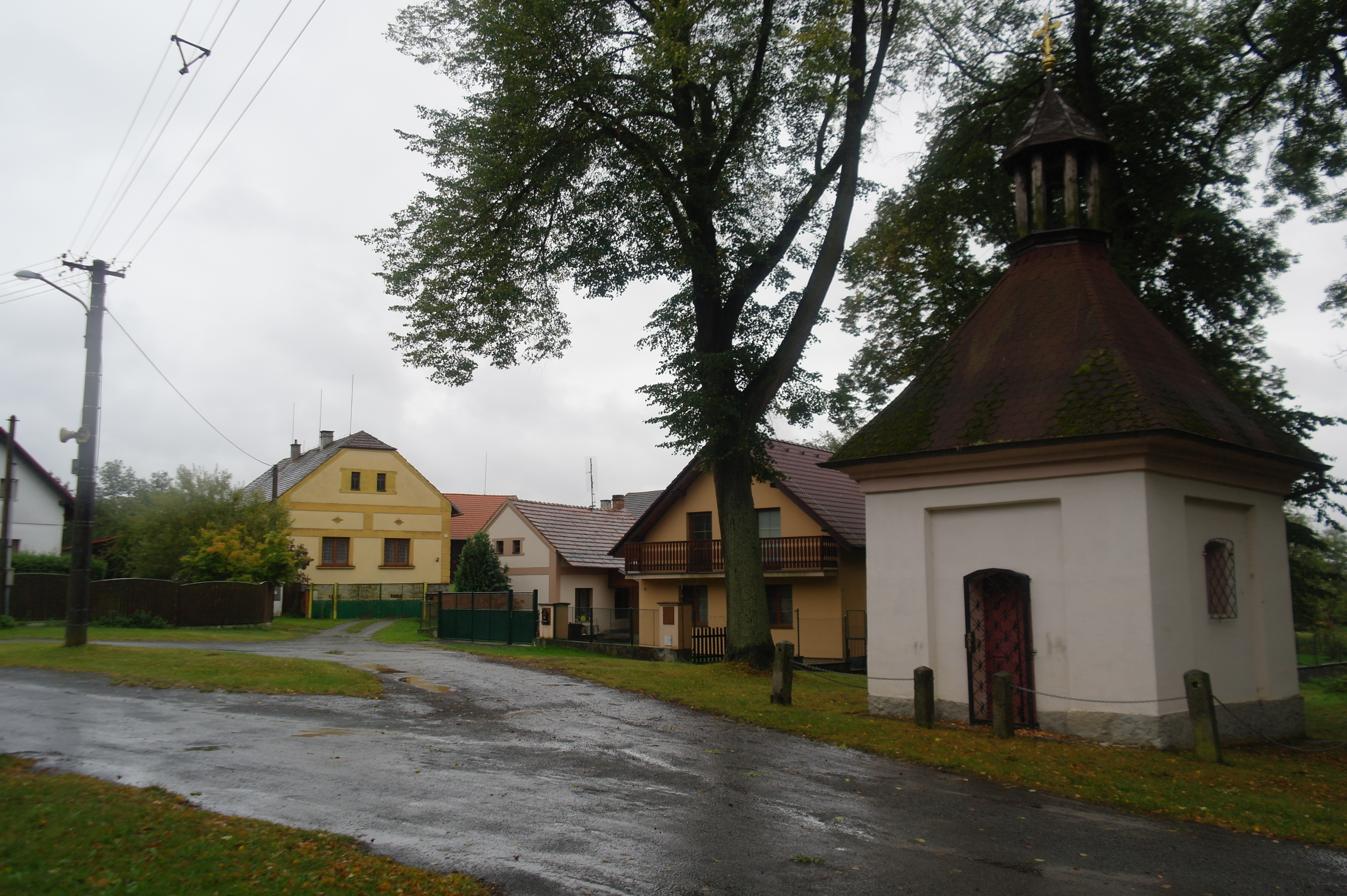
- Háje, a part of Řenče

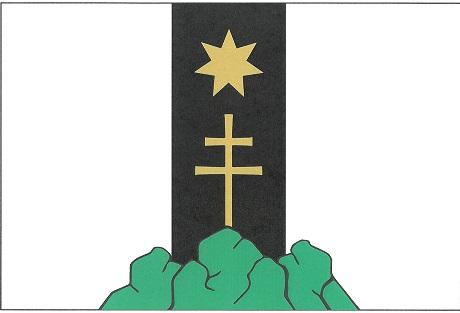
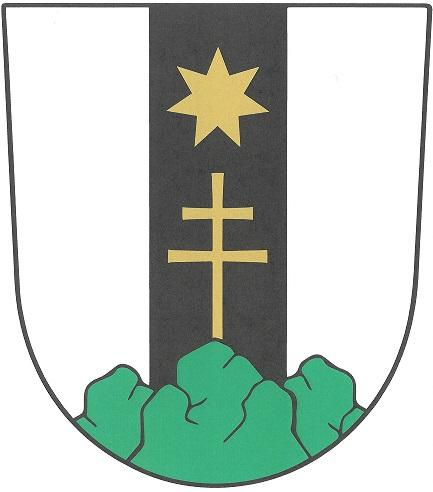
- Flag Coat of arms

- Location in the Czech Republic
- Coordinates: 49°34′48″N 13°24′52″E
- Country: Czech Republic
- Region: Plzeň
- District: Plzeň-South
- First mentioned: 1379

Area
  - Total: 26.16 km^{2} (10.10 sq mi)
- Elevation: 432 m (1,417 ft)

Population (2026-01-01)
  - Total: 933
  - Density: 35.7/km^{2} (92.4/sq mi)
- Time zone: UTC+1 (CET)
  - Summer (DST): UTC+2 (CEST)
- Postal code: 334 01
- Website: www.rence.cz

Řenče is a municipality and village in Plzeň-South District in the Plzeň Region of the Czech Republic. It has about 900 inhabitants.

Řenče lies approximately 19 kilometres (12 mi) south of Plzeň and 92 km (57 mi) south-west of Prague.

== Administrative division ==
Řenče consists of seven municipal parts (in brackets population according to the 2021 census):

- Řenče (292)
- Háje (97)
- Knihy (20)
- Libákovice (163)
- Osek (111)
- Plevňov (28)
- Vodokrty (166)

== Demographics ==
Historical population
Year	Pop.	±%
1869	1,408	—
1880	1,423	+1.1%
1890	1,370	−3.7%
1900	1,328	−3.1%
1910	1,433	+7.9%
1921	1,459	+1.8%
1930	1,324	−9.3%
1950	1,081	−18.4%
1961	1,058	−2.1%
1970	961	−9.2%
1980	887	−7.7%
1991	847	−4.5%
2001	880	+3.9%
2011	881	+0.1%
2021	877	−0.5%
Source: Censuses
