= Sierpc County =

Sierpc County Powiat sierpecki
- County
- Flag Coat of arms

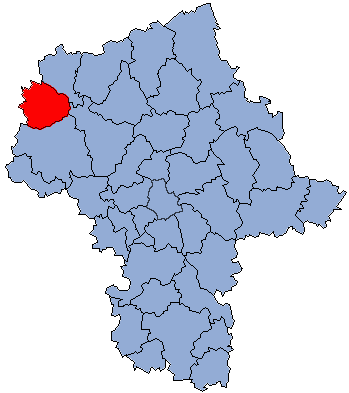
- Location within the voivodeship

- Division into gminas
- Coordinates (Sierpc): 52°53′N 19°40′E
- Country: Poland
- Voivodeship: Masovian
- Seat: Sierpc
- Gminas: Total 7 (incl. 1 urban): Sierpc; Gmina Gozdowo; Gmina Mochowo; Gmina Rościszewo; Gmina Sierpc; Gmina Szczutowo; Gmina Zawidz

Area
  - Total: 852.89 km^{2} (329.30 sq mi)

Population (2019)
  - Total: 52,077
  - Density: 61.059/km^{2} (158.14/sq mi)
  - Urban: 17,994
  - Rural: 34,083
- Car plates: WSE
- Website: www.powiat.sierpc.pl

Sierpc County (Polish: powiat sierpecki) is a unit of territorial administration and local government (powiat) in Masovian Voivodeship, east-central Poland. It came into being on 1 January 1999 as a result of the Polish local government reforms passed in 1998. Its administrative seat and only town is Sierpc, which lies 117 kilometres (73 mi) north-west of Warsaw.

The county covers an area of 852.89 square kilometres (329.3 sq mi). As of 2019 its total population is 52,077, out of which the population of Sierpc is 17,994, and the rural population is 34,083.

== Neighbouring counties ==
Sierpc County is bordered by Żuromin County to the north-east, Płońsk County to the east, Płock County to the south, Lipno County to the west and Rypin County to the north-west.

== Administrative divisions ==
The county is subdivided into seven gminas (one urban and six rural). These are listed in the following table, in descending order of population.

Gmina	Type	Area (km^{2})	Population (2019)	Seat
Sierpc	urban	18.6	17,994	
Gmina Sierpc	rural	150.2	7,024	Sierpc *
Gmina Zawidz	rural	186.1	6,608	Zawidz
Gmina Mochowo	rural	143.6	6,037	Mochowo
Gmina Gozdowo	rural	126.7	5,946	Gozdowo
Gmina Szczutowo	rural	112.6	4,327	Szczutowo
Gmina Rościszewo	rural	115.1	4,141	Rościszewo
* seat not part of the gmina
