= Lisice =

Lisice may refer to:

== Places ==
=== North Macedonia ===
- Lisiče, Čaška, North Macedonia
- Dolno Lisiče ("Lower Lisiče"), North Macedonia
- Gorno Lisiče ("Upper Lisiče"), North Macedonia
- Novo Lisiče ("New Lisiče"), North Macedonia

=== Poland ===
- Lisice, Greater Poland Voivodeship, Poland
- Lisice, Masovian Voivodeship, Poland
- Lisice-Folwark, Poland
- Lisice Nowe, Poland

=== Other ===
- Lišice, Czech Republic
- Lisice, Ljubuški, Bosnia and Herzegovina
- Lisicë, Mitrovica, Kosovo
- Lisice, Serbia, Serbia

== Other ==
- Lisice (1969), a 1969 Yugoslav film
