= Golejewo =

Golejewo may refer to the following places:

- Golejewo, Greater Poland Voivodeship (west-central Poland)
- Golejewo, Kuyavian-Pomeranian Voivodeship (central Poland)
- Golejewo, Masovian Voivodeship (north-central Poland)
- Golejewo, Choszczno County in West Pomeranian Voivodeship (north-west Poland)
- Golejewo, Myślibórz County in West Pomeranian Voivodeship (north-west Poland)
