= Zakrzewko =

Zakrzewko may refer to the following places:

- Zakrzewko, Nowy Tomyśl County in Greater Poland Voivodeship (west-central Poland)
- Zakrzewko, Kuyavian-Pomeranian Voivodeship (north-central Poland)
- Zakrzewko, Masovian Voivodeship (north-central Poland)
- Zakrzewko, Szamotuły County in Greater Poland Voivodeship (west-central Poland)
- Zakrzewko, Warmian-Masurian Voivodeship (north Poland)
