= Lisicka =

Lisicka may refer to:

- Lisicka, feminine for Lisicki, Polish surname
- Lisická, feminine for Lisický, Czech and Slovak surname
