= Kowalewo-Skorupki =

- Village
- Location within Poland
- Coordinates: 52°44′04″N 19°41′48″E
- Country: Poland
- Voivodeship: Masovian
- County: Sierpc
- Gmina: Gozdowo
- Population: 70
- Time zone: UTC+1 (CET)
  - Summer (DST): UTC+2 (CEST)
- Vehicle registration: WSE

Kowalewo-Skorupki [kɔvaˈlɛvɔ skɔˈrupki] is a village in the administrative district of Gmina Gozdowo, within Sierpc County, Masovian Voivodeship, in north-central Poland.

== History ==
Kowalewo-Skorupki was part of the local okolica szlachecka called Kowalewo. It was probably founded in the 13th century, as settlements named Kowalewo were mentioned during the establishment of a Catholic parish in Gozdowo in 1305. The name Skorupki was first mentioned in 1404. Until the sixteenth century the name of the village was written variously as Skorupki, Kowalewo alias Skorupki, lub Kowalewo Skorupki.

Near the village there was a settlement Kowalewo-Sule noted at the end of the eighteenth century (located between Kowalewo Podborne and Białuty). Initially it was a village belonging to one branch of the Kowalewo family. A list of Tax from 1531 mentions two heirs, Paweł and Andrzej Jana Mścicha. They belonged to the family coat of arms Junosza Kowalewskich. Inventory tax in 1578 shows the breakdown of the village into three parts. In the second half of the seventeenth century, mainly Kowalewscy lived here, with six nobility. In 1734 the divisions of the Kowalewo area were: Kowalewscy, Łukoscy, Umińscy, Kuskowscy, Rycharski and Czachorowski. According to the census of the landowners of the late eighteenth century inherited here: Czarnomski, Koskowscy, Kowalewscy, Roman, Rycharscy, Umieński. So, it was a village divided between a number of nobles. Some belonged to the poor gentry, and others to a richer small farm. In 1827 the Skorupki was recorded 8 houses 59 residents. During the January Uprising gentry was the basic strength of the insurgent troops.

The Skorupki in 1883 counted 8 houses and 80 residents. The whole village had 338 acres of land including 302 acres of land of the manor. This small village parochial become an important educational center in the area. Since 1890 there has been a parish school here. They then created a folk school. At the same time the construction of a brick elementary school took place (before World War I). It was one of the first brick school in the district. It was one of the rebel schools during the events of 1905–1907, apparently burning portraits of the Tsar. In 1921, this town had 9 houses and 91 residents, belonged to the municipality of Białyszewo. There are two historic buildings: the wooden house number 8 from the mid-nineteenth century, the property of J. Kowalewski, and the wooden house from the mid-nineteenth century, J. Kowalewski property. In 1975-1998 the town administratively belonged to the province of Plock.
