= Silesian Guitar Octet =

Silesian Guitar Octet is the only performing octet in the world that has a stable structure. The Octet consists of professors, graduates, and students of Musical Academy in Katowice, Poland.

== The octet ==
The musical group was created in 2001 by Franciszek Wieczorek. In the beginning, there was an idea to put together as many guitars as possible and at the same time not to create a guitar orchestra. Originally, each of the guitarists should have his or her own part. Later on, the number of guitarists has become eight.

The group received first prize at the international festival INTER ARTIA (Greece) 2008. The Silesian Guitar Octet has recorded for BBC WORLDS television and Polish Radio. The first album of the group, entitled OCT.OPUS, was nominated to win the Polish music award FRYDERYKI in 2009. The second album of the group, The XXth Century, was released in January 2011.

The Silesian Guitar Octet has appeared in numerous concerts in Poland as well as in the Czech Republic, Denmark, Hungary, Slovakia, Sweden, Austria, Greece, Italy and the United Kingdom.

== Members ==
- Dawid Bonk - a student at the Katowice Music Academy, taught by professor Alina Gruszka, is a laureate at national and international guitar competitions in Koszalin, Gdańsk and Tychy (Poland), and Velbert (Germany).
- Jan Kudełka - has just finished the Musical Academy in Katowice, he was a student of professor Alina Gruszka and is a prize winner at guitar competitions in Omiš (Croatia), Volos (Greece), Uzhhorod (Ukraine) and Mrzeżyno, Gdańsk and Cieszyn (Poland).
- Franciszek Wieczorek - a teacher at Katowice Secondary Music School, is the group founder, leader and the father of the thought; he is also a publisher, organizer of the musical life and an artistic director of the Żory International Guitar Festival, Poland.
- Katarina Wieczorek - a teacher in Secondary Music School in Katowice; together with her husband she co-manages the artistic agency Modran as artistic director of the Żory International Guitar Festival, Poland.
- Wojciech Gurgul - a student of Professor Alina Gruszka at the Musical Academy in Katowice, is a laureate of guitar competitions in Gdańsk and Olsztyn (Poland).
- Radosław Wieczorek - a student of Professor Janusz Sochacki at the Kraków Music Academy, is a laureate of guitar competitions in Poland (Rybnik, Elbląg, Sanok) and abroad (Dolný Kubín (Slovakia), Rust (Austria)).
- Wojciech Rysiecki - a student of Franciszek Wieczorek in Secondary Music School in Katowice, is a laureate of the guitar concourses in Poland (Krynica-Zdrój, Żory, Trzęsacz, Warsaw) and abroad (Dolný Kubín (Slovakia)).
- Krzysztof Kołodziej - a student of Dr Michal Nagy at the Academy of Music in Cracow, is a prize winner at festivals in Barletta (Italy), Štramberk (Czech Republic), Uzhhorod (Ukraine), Sanok, Krasiczyn, Trzęsacz, Zabrze, Konin and Żory (Poland).

== Repertoire ==
There are very few pieces which are originally written for an octet. Because of this, Franciszek Wieczorek has had to carry out the transcription of many beautiful pearls for the orchestra music. The group's core repertoire consists of works by J.S. Bach, W.A. Mozart, P.I. Tchaikovsky, E. Grieg, M. Ravel, J. Turina, G. Gershwin, A. Khachaturian, L. Bernstein, L. Brouwer, R. Dyens and many others.

== Discography ==
- Oct.Opus (2008)
- The XXth Century (2011)
