= Kępiniec =

- Settlement
- Location within Poland
- Coordinates: 52°56′56″N 15°20′10″E
- Country: Poland
- Voivodeship: West Pomeranian
- County: Choszczno
- Gmina: Pełczyce

Kępiniec [kɛmˈpiɲɛt͡s] is a settlement in the administrative district of Gmina Pełczyce, within Choszczno County, West Pomeranian Voivodeship, in north-western Poland. It lies approximately 11 km (7 mi) south of Pełczyce, 25 km (16 mi) south of Choszczno, and 73 km (45 mi) south-east of the regional capital Szczecin.

For the history of the region, see History of Pomerania.
