= Bukwica, West Pomeranian Voivodeship =

Bukwica
- Village
- Location within Poland
- Coordinates: 53°4′28″N 15°22′29″E
- Country: Poland
- Voivodeship: West Pomeranian
- County: Choszczno
- Gmina: Pełczyce
- Population: 162

Bukwica [bukˈfit͡sa] is a village in the administrative district of Gmina Pełczyce, within Choszczno County, West Pomeranian Voivodeship, in north-western Poland. It lies approximately 6 km (4 mi) north-east of Pełczyce, 11 km (7 mi) south of Choszczno, and 65 km (40 mi) south-east of the regional capital Szczecin.

For the history of the region, see History of Pomerania.

The village has a population of 162.
