= Jarosławsko =

- Village
- Location within Poland
- Coordinates: 53°0′20″N 15°25′14″E
- Country: Poland
- Voivodeship: West Pomeranian
- County: Choszczno
- Gmina: Pełczyce

Jarosławsko [jarɔˈswafskɔ] (formerly German Gerzlow/Neumark) is a village in the administrative district of Gmina Pełczyce, within Choszczno County, West Pomeranian Voivodeship, in north-western Poland. It lies approximately 9 km (6 mi) south-east of Pełczyce, 18 km (11 mi) south of Choszczno, and 73 km (45 mi) south-east of the regional capital Szczecin.

== History ==
For the history of the region, see History of Pomerania.
