= Papowo-Osieki =

- Part of village
- Location within Poland
- Coordinates: 53°4′0″N 18°39′7″E
- Country: Poland
- Voivodeship: Kuyavian-Pomeranian
- County: Toruń
- Gmina: Łysomice

Papowo-Osieki [paˈpɔvɔ ɔˈɕɛki] in Papowo Toruńskie village in the district of Gmina Łysomice, within Toruń County, Kuyavian-Pomeranian Voivodeship, in north-central Poland.
