= Julianka =

Julianka may refer to the following places in Poland:

- Julianka, Kuyavian-Pomeranian Voivodeship (north-central Poland)
- Julianka, Podlaskie Voivodeship (north-east Poland)
- Julianka, Silesian Voivodeship (south Poland)
