= Chrapowo =

- Village
- Location within Poland
- Coordinates: 53°2′47″N 15°14′59″E
- Country: Poland
- Voivodeship: West Pomeranian
- County: Choszczno
- Gmina: Pełczyce
- Population: 320

Chrapowo [xraˈpɔvɔ] is a village in the administrative district of Gmina Pełczyce, within Choszczno County, West Pomeranian Voivodeship, in north-western Poland. It lies approximately 4 km (2 mi) west of Pełczyce, 17 km (11 mi) south-west of Choszczno, and 61 km (38 mi) south-east of the regional capital Szczecin.

For the history of the region, see History of Pomerania.

The village has a population of 320.
