= Będargowiec =

- Village
- Location within Poland
- Coordinates: 53°0′45″N 15°23′27″E
- Country: Poland
- Voivodeship: West Pomeranian
- County: Choszczno
- Gmina: Pełczyce

Będargowiec [bɛndarˈɡɔvjɛt͡s] is a village in the administrative district of Gmina Pełczyce, within Choszczno County, West Pomeranian Voivodeship, in north-western Poland. It lies approximately 7 km (4 mi) south-east of Pełczyce, 18 km (11 mi) south of Choszczno, and 71 km (44 mi) south-east of the regional capital Szczecin.

For the history of the region, see History of Pomerania.
