= Puszczyn =

- Village
- Location within Poland
- Coordinates: 53°5′19″N 15°23′28″E
- Country: Poland
- Voivodeship: West Pomeranian
- County: Choszczno
- Gmina: Pełczyce
- Population: 10

Puszczyn [ˈpuʂt͡ʂɨn] is a village in the administrative district of Gmina Pełczyce, within Choszczno County, West Pomeranian Voivodeship, in north-western Poland. It lies approximately 8 km (5 mi) north-east of Pełczyce, 9 km (6 mi) south of Choszczno, and 65 km (40 mi) south-east of the regional capital Szczecin.

For the history of the region, see History of Pomerania.

The village has a population of 10.
