= Boguszyny =

- Village
- Location within Poland
- Coordinates: 53°5′N 15°21′E
- Country: Poland
- Voivodeship: West Pomeranian
- County: Choszczno
- Gmina: Pełczyce

Boguszyny [bɔɡuˈʂɨnɨ] is a village in the administrative district of Gmina Pełczyce, within Choszczno County, West Pomeranian Voivodeship, in north-western Poland. It lies approximately 6 km (4 mi) north-east of Pełczyce, 10 km (6 mi) south of Choszczno, and 64 km (40 mi) south-east of the regional capital Szczecin.

For the history of the region, see History of Pomerania.
