= Jagów =

- Village
- Location within Poland
- Coordinates: 53°3′49″N 15°14′38″E
- Country: Poland
- Voivodeship: West Pomeranian
- County: Choszczno
- Gmina: Pełczyce

Jagów [ˈjaɡuf] (formerly German Jagow) is a village in the administrative district of Gmina Pełczyce, within Choszczno County, West Pomeranian Voivodeship, in north-western Poland. It lies approximately 5 km (3 mi) north-west of Pełczyce, 16 km (10 mi) south-west of Choszczno, and 59 km (37 mi) south-east of the regional capital Szczecin.

For the history of the region, see History of Pomerania.
