= Krzynki =

- Village
- Location within Poland
- Coordinates: 52°59′29″N 15°22′12″E
- Country: Poland
- Voivodeship: West Pomeranian
- County: Choszczno
- Gmina: Pełczyce

Krzynki [ˈkʂɨnki] (German: Krining) is a village in the administrative district of Gmina Pełczyce, within Choszczno County, West Pomeranian Voivodeship, in north-western Poland. It lies approximately 8 km (5 mi) south-east of Pełczyce, 20 km (12 mi) south of Choszczno, and 71 km (44 mi) south-east of the regional capital Szczecin.

For the history of the region, see History of Pomerania.
