= Ługowo, West Pomeranian Voivodeship =

Ługowo
- Village
- Location within Poland
- Coordinates: 53°0′56″N 15°20′11″E
- Country: Poland
- Voivodeship: West Pomeranian
- County: Choszczno
- Gmina: Pełczyce

Ługowo [wuˈɡɔvɔ] is a village in the administrative district of Gmina Pełczyce, within Choszczno County, West Pomeranian Voivodeship, in north-western Poland. It is located approximately 4 km (2 mi) south-east of Pełczyce, 18 km (11 mi) south of Choszczno, and 68 km (42 mi) south-east of the regional capital, Szczecin.

For the history of the region, see History of Pomerania.
