= Przekolno =

- Village
- Location within Poland
- Coordinates: 53°3′N 15°23′E
- Country: Poland
- Voivodeship: West Pomeranian
- County: Choszczno
- Gmina: Pełczyce

Przekolno [pʂɛˈkɔlnɔ] (German: Groß Ehrenberg) is a village in the administrative district of Gmina Pełczyce, within Choszczno County, West Pomeranian Voivodeship, in north-western Poland. It lies approximately 6 km (4 mi) east of Pełczyce, 13 km (8 mi) south of Choszczno, and 68 km (42 mi) south-east of the regional capital Szczecin.

For the history of the region, see History of Pomerania.
