= Brzyczno =

- Village
- Location within Poland
- Coordinates: 53°6′0″N 15°17′10″E
- Country: Poland
- Voivodeship: West Pomeranian
- County: Choszczno
- Gmina: Pełczyce

Brzyczno [ˈbʐɨt͡ʂnɔ] is a village in the administrative district of Gmina Pełczyce, within Choszczno County, West Pomeranian Voivodeship, in north-western Poland. It lies approximately 7 km (4 mi) north of Pełczyce, 11 km (7 mi) south-west of Choszczno, and 59 km (37 mi) south-east of the regional capital Szczecin.

For the history of the region, see History of Pomerania.
