= Trynno =

- Village
- Location within Poland
- Coordinates: 53°2′9″N 15°25′18″E
- Country: Poland
- Voivodeship: West Pomeranian
- County: Choszczno
- Gmina: Pełczyce
- Population: 10

Trynno [ˈtrɨnnɔ] is a village in the administrative district of Gmina Pełczyce, within Choszczno County, West Pomeranian Voivodeship, in north-western Poland. It lies approximately 8 km (5 mi) east of Pełczyce, 15 km (9 mi) south of Choszczno, and 71 km (44 mi) south-east of the regional capital Szczecin.

For the history of the region, see History of Pomerania.

The village has a population of 10.
