= Wierzchno =

Wierzchno may refer to the following places:

- Wierzchno, Lubusz Voivodeship (west Poland)
- Wierzchno, Choszczno County in West Pomeranian Voivodeship (north-west Poland)
- Wierzchno, Myślibórz County in West Pomeranian Voivodeship (north-west Poland)
