= Lubiana, West Pomeranian Voivodeship =

Lubiana
- Village
- Location within Poland
- Coordinates: 53°5′57″N 15°20′42″E
- Country: Poland
- Voivodeship: West Pomeranian
- County: Choszczno
- Gmina: Pełczyce

Lubiana [luˈbjana] (German: Alt Libbehne) is a village in the administrative district of Gmina Pełczyce, within Choszczno County, West Pomeranian Voivodeship, in north-western Poland. It lies approximately 7 km (4 mi) north-east of Pełczyce, 9 km (6 mi) south-west of Choszczno, and 62 km (39 mi) south-east of the regional capital Szczecin.

For the history of the region, see History of Pomerania.
