= Sułkowo, Choszczno County =

Sułkowo
- Village
- Location within Poland
- Coordinates: 53°5′15″N 15°16′35″E
- Country: Poland
- Voivodeship: West Pomeranian
- County: Choszczno
- Gmina: Pełczyce
- Population: 10

Sułkowo [suu̯ˈkɔvɔ] is a village in the administrative district of Gmina Pełczyce, within Choszczno County, West Pomeranian Voivodeship, in north-western Poland. It lies approximately 6 km (4 mi) north of Pełczyce, 13 km (8 mi) south-west of Choszczno, and 59 km (37 mi) south-east of the regional capital Szczecin.

For the history of the region, see History of Pomerania.

The village has a population of 10.
