= Sarnik =

- Village
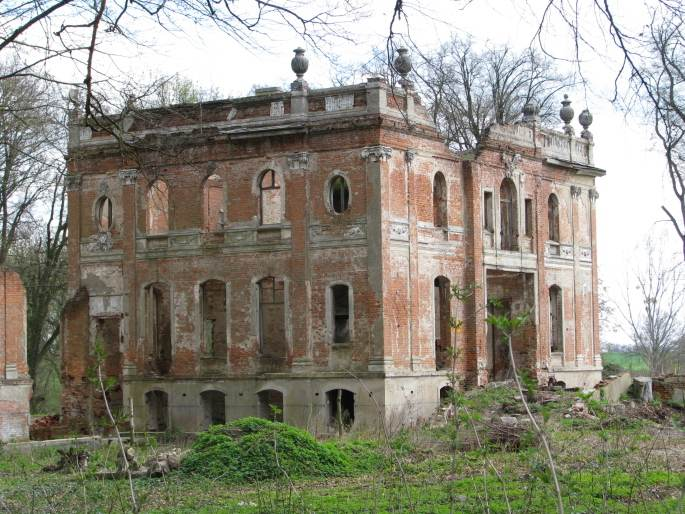
- Sarnik Palace

- Location within Poland
- Coordinates: 53°0′N 15°18′E
- Country: Poland
- Voivodeship: West Pomeranian
- County: Choszczno
- Gmina: Pełczyce
- Time zone: UTC+1 (CET)
  - Summer (DST): UTC+2 (CEST)
- Vehicle registration: ZCH

Sarnik [ˈsarnik] is a village in the administrative district of Gmina Pełczyce, within Choszczno County, West Pomeranian Voivodeship, in north-western Poland. It lies approximately 5 km (3 mi) south of Pełczyce, 20 km (12 mi) south of Choszczno, and 67 km (42 mi) south-east of the regional capital Szczecin.
