= Płotno =

- Village
- Location within Poland
- Coordinates: 53°5′N 15°18′E
- Country: Poland
- Voivodeship: West Pomeranian
- County: Choszczno
- Gmina: Pełczyce

Płotno [ˈpwɔtnɔ] (German: Blankensee) is a village in the administrative district of Gmina Pełczyce, within Choszczno County, West Pomeranian Voivodeship, in north-western Poland. It lies approximately 5 km (3 mi) north of Pełczyce, 12 km (7 mi) south-west of Choszczno, and 61 km (38 mi) south-east of the regional capital Szczecin. In 2007, the village had 429 inhabitants.

For the history of the region, see History of Pomerania.
