= Bolewice, West Pomeranian Voivodeship =

Bolewice
- Village
- Location within Poland
- Coordinates: 53°3′31″N 15°19′59″E
- Country: Poland
- Voivodeship: West Pomeranian
- County: Choszczno
- Gmina: Pełczyce
- Population: 214

Bolewice [bɔlɛˈvit͡sɛ] is a village in the administrative district of Gmina Pełczyce, within Choszczno County, West Pomeranian Voivodeship, in north-western Poland. It lies approximately 3 km (2 mi) north-east of Pełczyce, 13 km (8 mi) south of Choszczno, and 64 km (40 mi) south-east of the regional capital Szczecin.

For the history of the region, see History of Pomerania.
