= Nadarzyn, West Pomeranian Voivodeship =

Nadarzyn
- Village
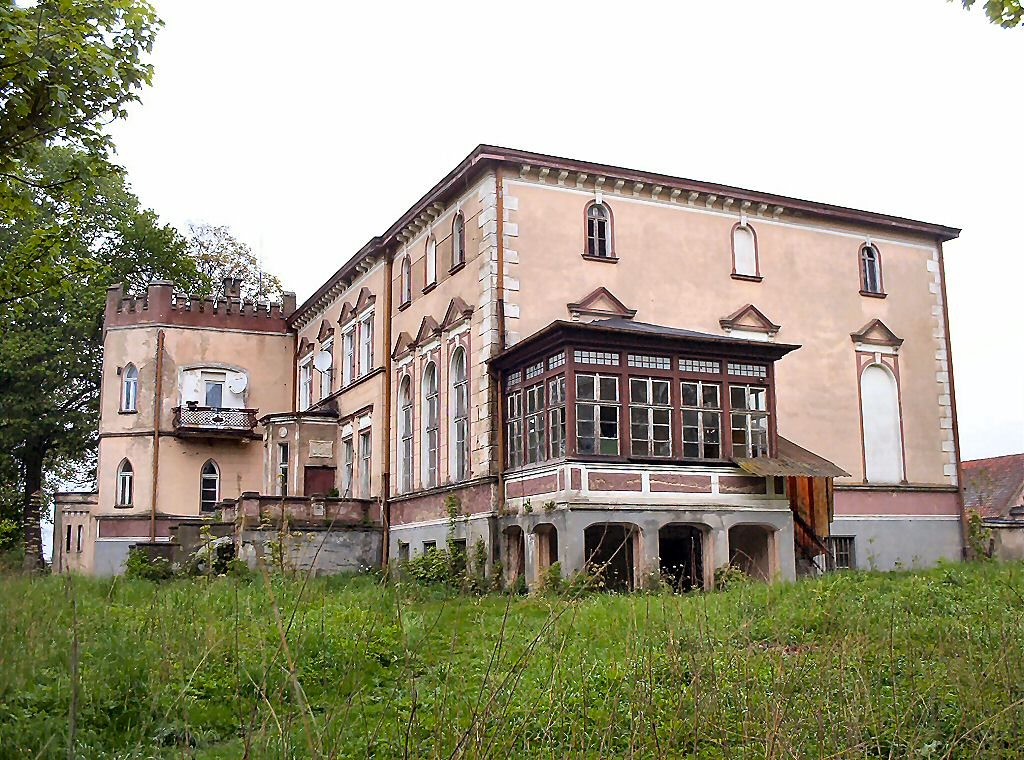
- Nadarzyn Palace

- Location within Poland
- Coordinates: 53°7′N 15°19′E
- Country: Poland
- Voivodeship: West Pomeranian
- County: Choszczno
- Gmina: Pełczyce
- Time zone: UTC+1 (CET)
  - Summer (DST): UTC+2 (CEST)
- Vehicle registration: ZCH

Nadarzyn [naˈdaʐɨn] is a village in the administrative district of Gmina Pełczyce, within Choszczno County, West Pomeranian Voivodeship, in north-western Poland. It lies approximately 9 km (6 mi) north of Pełczyce, 8 km (5 mi) south-west of Choszczno, and 60 km (37 mi) south-east of the regional capital Szczecin.
