= Będargowo =

Będargowo may refer to the following places:

- Będargowo, Pomeranian Voivodeship (north Poland)
- Będargowo, Choszczno County in West Pomeranian Voivodeship (north-west Poland)
- Będargowo, Police County in West Pomeranian Voivodeship (north-west Poland)
