= Stradzewo =

Stradzewo may refer to the following places:

- Stradzewo, Lubusz Voivodeship (west Poland)
- Stradzewo, Masovian Voivodeship (north-central Poland)
- Stradzewo, West Pomeranian Voivodeship (north-west Poland)
