= Niesporowice =

- Village
- Location within Poland
- Coordinates: 52°58′56″N 15°20′3″E
- Country: Poland
- Voivodeship: West Pomeranian
- County: Choszczno
- Gmina: Pełczyce

Niesporowice [ɲɛspɔrɔˈvit͡sɛ] (German: Hasselbusch) is a village in the administrative district of Gmina Pełczyce, within Choszczno County, West Pomeranian Voivodeship, in north-western Poland. It lies approximately 8 km (5 mi) south of Pełczyce, 21 km (13 mi) south of Choszczno, and 70 km (43 mi) south-east of the regional capital Szczecin.

For the history of the region, see History of Pomerania.
