= Jena Observatory =

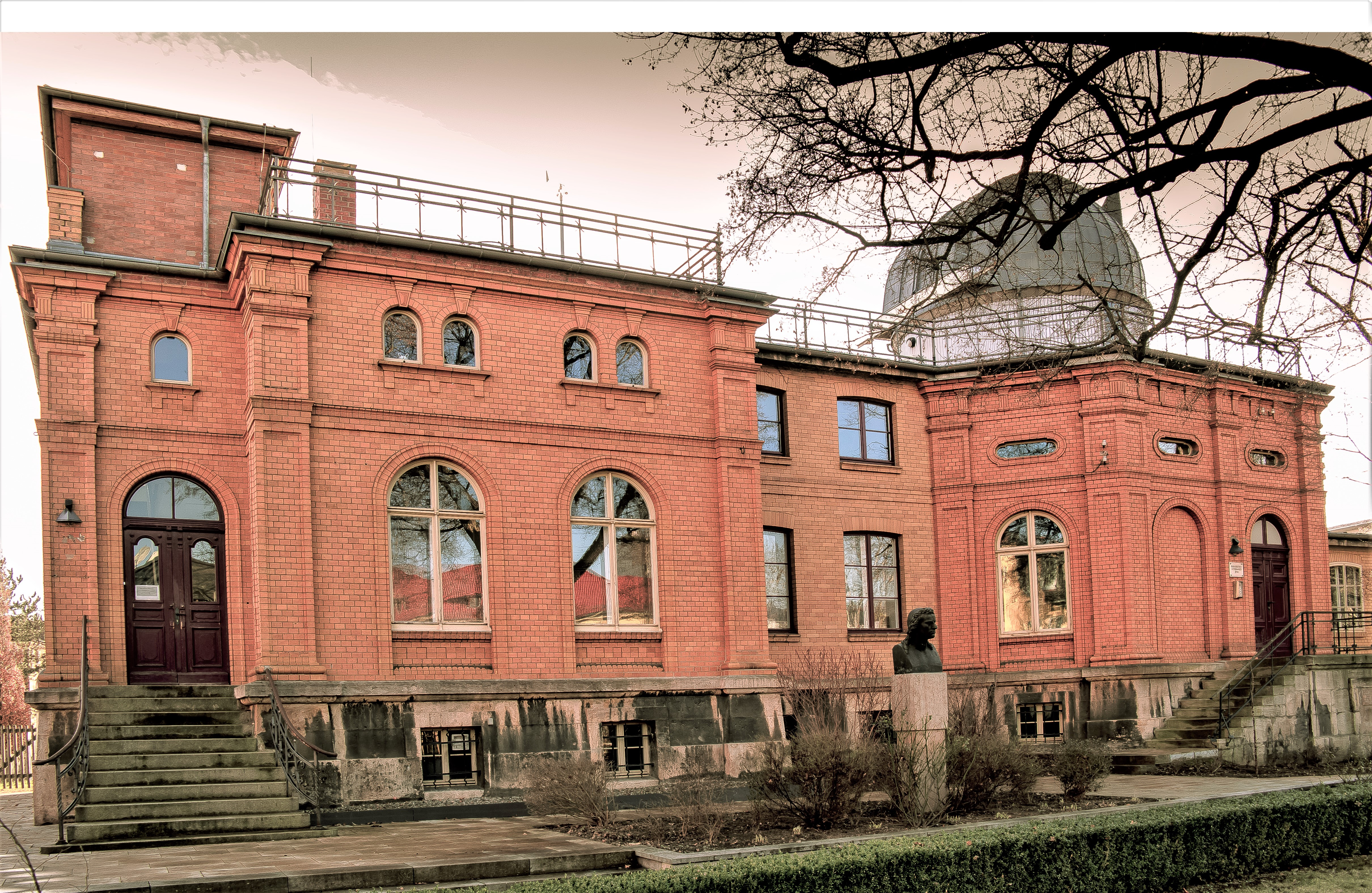
- Alternative names: AIU
- Observatory code: 032
- Location: Jena, Thuringia, Germany
- Coordinates: 50°55′31″N 11°34′58″E
- Location of Jena Observatory
- Related media on Commons

Astrophysikalisches Institut und Universitäts-Sternwarte Jena (AIU Jena, Astrophysical Institute and University Observatory Jena, or simply Jena Observatory) is an astronomical observatory owned and operated by Friedrich Schiller University of Jena. It has two main locations in Jena, Germany

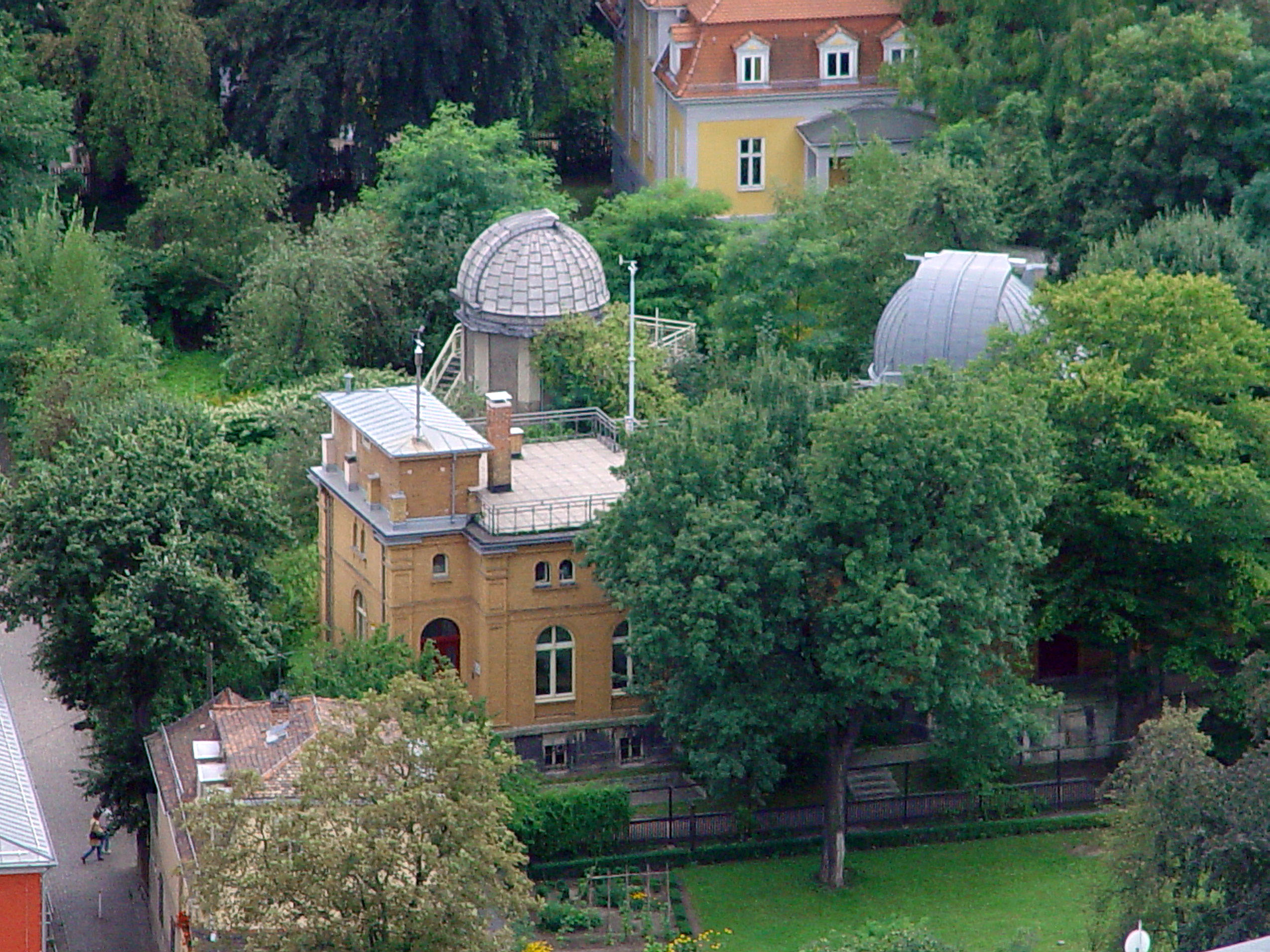
The main building in Jena consists of the institute itself, and the "Volkssternwarte Urania".

and the neighbouring village of Großschwabhausen.

== History ==
The first observatory was built in 1813, and replaced by a bigger one in 1889. It was funded by local regent Karl August von Sachsen-Weimar-Eisenach and planned by Johann Wolfgang Goethe. Its most famous director in the later decades was Ernst Abbe.

The new observatory in Großschwabhausen was built in 1962, in order to avoid the light pollution from the city of Jena. The old main observatory in the city centre is the home of "Volkssternwarte Urania", a society of hobbyist astronomers. They offer public access and courses for children and adults, and host events like watching comets or lunar eclipses.

== WASP-3c & TTV ==
Transit Timing Variation (TTV), a variation on the transit method, was used to discover an exoplanet WASP-3c by Rozhen Observatory, Jena Observatory, and Toruń Centre for Astronomy.

== See also ==
- List of astronomical observatories
