= Gozdowo, Masovian Voivodeship =

Gozdowo
- Village
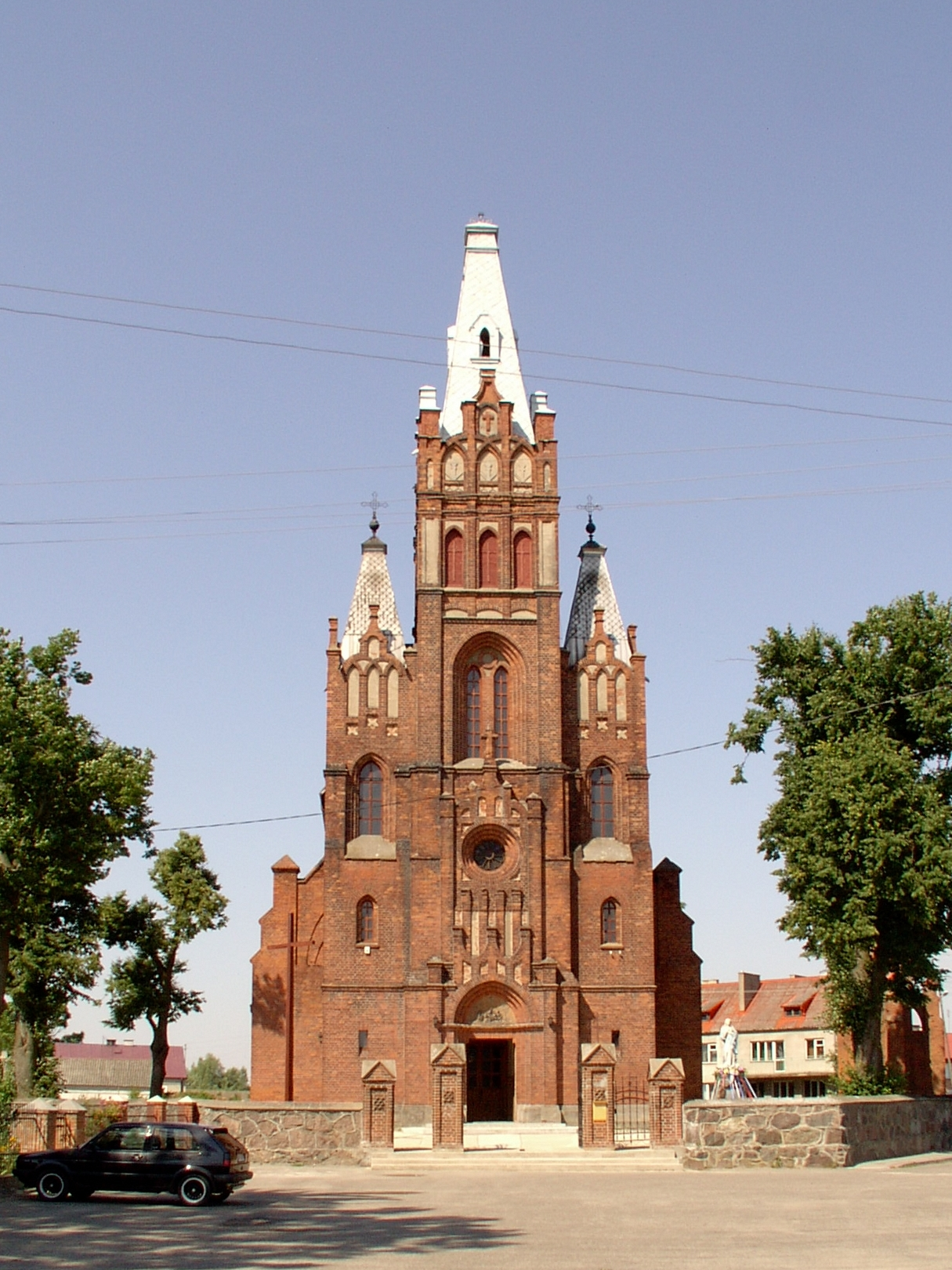
- Church of All Saints

- Location within Poland
- Coordinates: 52°43′28″N 19°41′1″E
- Country: Poland
- Voivodeship: Masovian
- County: Sierpc
- Gmina: Gozdowo

Population
  - Total: 1,403
- Time zone: UTC+1 (CET)
  - Summer (DST): UTC+2 (CEST)
- Vehicle registration: WSE

Gozdowo [ɡɔzˈdɔvɔ] is a village in Sierpc County, Masovian Voivodeship, in north-central Poland. It is the seat of the gmina (administrative district) called Gmina Gozdowo.
