= Kurowo, Sierpc County =

Kurowo
- Village
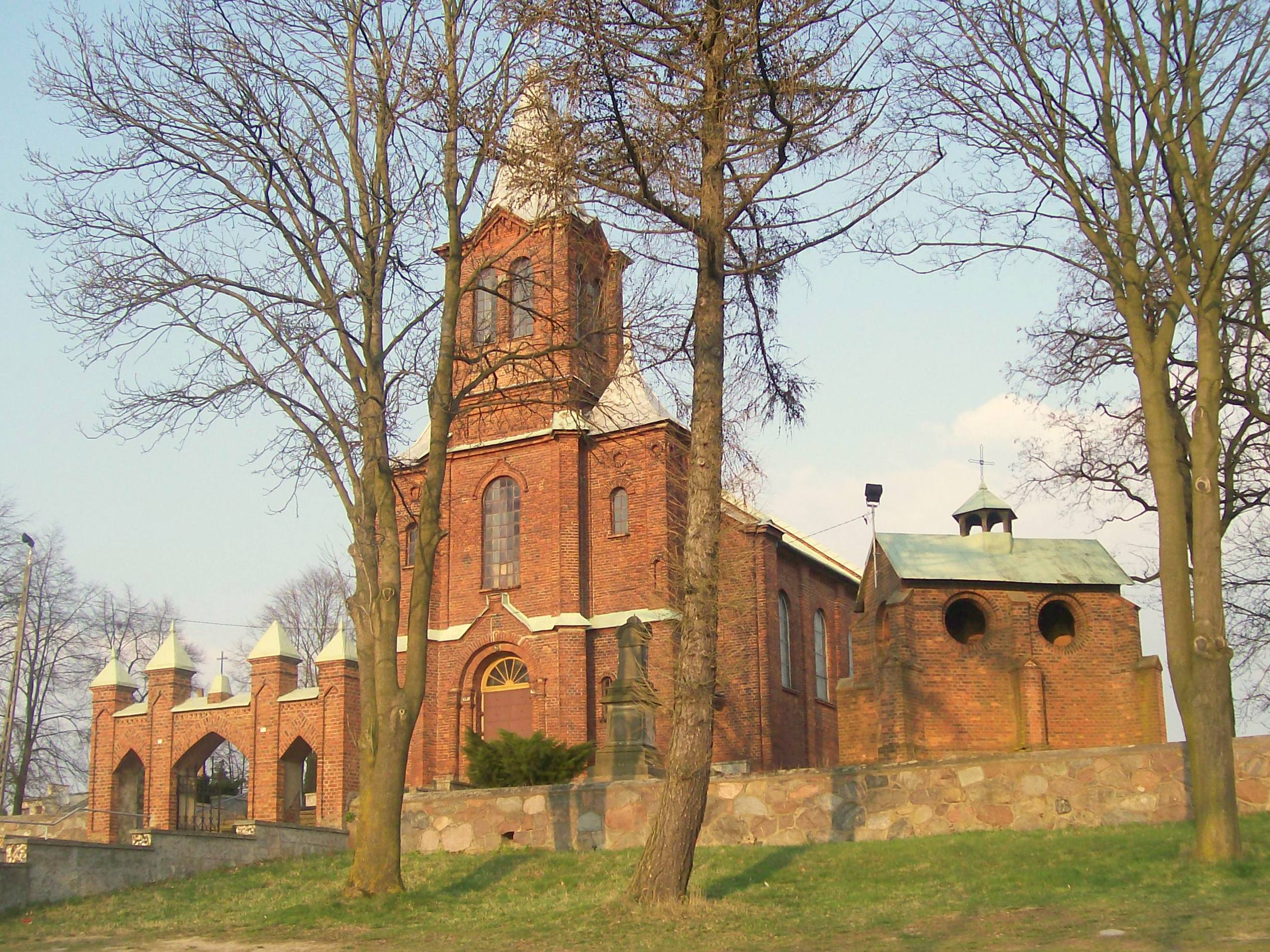
- Saints Peter and Paul the Apostles church in Kurowo

- Location within Poland
- Coordinates: 52°46′32″N 19°38′48″E
- Country: Poland
- Voivodeship: Masovian
- County: Sierpc
- Gmina: Gozdowo
- Time zone: UTC+1 (CET)
  - Summer (DST): UTC+2 (CEST)
- Vehicle registration: WSE

Kurowo [kuˈrɔvɔ] is a village in the administrative district of Gmina Gozdowo, within Sierpc County, Masovian Voivodeship, in north-central Poland.
