= Lipniczki =

- Village
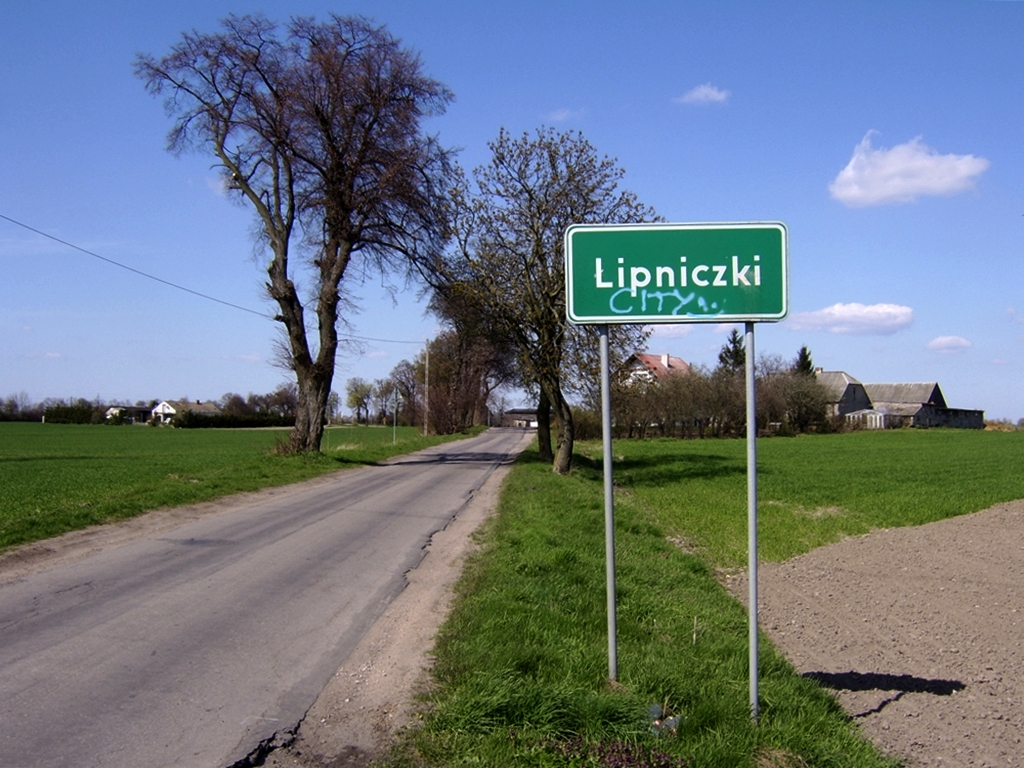
- Entrance of Lipniczki

- Location within Poland
- Coordinates: 53°04′51″N 18°42′21″E
- Country: Poland
- Voivodeship: Kuyavian-Pomeranian
- County: Toruń
- Gmina: Łysomice

Lipniczki (Polish pronunciation: [lipˈɲit͡ʂkʲi]) is a village in the administrative district of Gmina Łysomice, within Toruń County, Kuyavian-Pomeranian Voivodeship, in north-central Poland.
