= Dolne, Choszczno County =

Dolne
- Village
- Location within Poland
- Coordinates: 52°57′31″N 15°17′32″E
- Country: Poland
- Voivodeship: West Pomeranian
- County: Choszczno
- Gmina: Pełczyce

Dolne [ˈdɔlnɛ] is a village in the administrative district of Gmina Pełczyce, within Choszczno County, West Pomeranian Voivodeship, in north-western Poland.

For the history of the region, see History of Pomerania.
