= Gmina Łysomice =

Gmina Łysomice Łysomice Commune
- Gmina
- Flag Coat of arms

- Location within Poland
- Coordinates (Łysomice): 53°5′N 18°37′E
- Country: Poland
- Voivodeship: Kuyavian-Pomeranian
- County: Toruń County
- Seat: Łysomice

Area
  - Total: 127.34 km^{2} (49.17 sq mi)

Population (2006)
  - Total: 8,396
  - Density: 65.93/km^{2} (170.8/sq mi)
- Website: http://www.lysomice.pl/

Gmina Łysomice is a rural gmina (administrative district) in Toruń County, Kuyavian-Pomeranian Voivodeship, in north-central Poland. Its seat is the village of Łysomice, which lies approximately 6 kilometres (4 mi) north of Toruń.

The gmina covers an area of 127.34 square kilometres (49.2 sq mi), and as of 2006 its total population is 8,396.

== Villages ==
Gmina Łysomice contains the villages and settlements of Chorab, Gostkowo, Julianka, Kamionki Duże, Kamionki Małe, Kowróz, Kowrózek, Lipniczki, Lulkowo, Łysomice, Ostaszewo, Papowo Toruńskie, Papowo-Osieki, Piwnice, Różankowo, Świerczynki, Świerczyny, Turzno, Tylice, Wytrębowice, Zakrzewko and Zęgwirt.

== Neighbouring gminas ==
Gmina Łysomice is bordered by the city of Toruń and by the gminas of Chełmża, Kowalewo Pomorskie, Łubianka, Lubicz and Zławieś Wielka.
