= Gmina Gozdowo =

Gmina Gozdowo Gozdowo Commune
- Gmina
- Coat of arms
- Interactive map of Gmina Gozdowo
- Coordinates (Gozdowo): 52°43′28″N 19°41′1″E
- Country: Poland
- Voivodeship: Masovian
- County: Sierpc
- Seat: Gozdowo

Area
  - Total: 126.7 km^{2} (48.9 sq mi)

Population (2006)
  - Total: 6,041
  - Density: 47.68/km^{2} (123.5/sq mi)
- Time zone: UTC+1 (CET)
  - Summer (DST): UTC+2 (CEST)
- Vehicle registration: WSE
- Website: http://www.gminagozdowo.vel.pl/

Gmina Gozdowo is a rural gmina (administrative district) in Sierpc County, Masovian Voivodeship, in north-central Poland. Its seat is the village of Gozdowo, which lies approximately 18 kilometres (11 mi) south of Sierpc and 106 km (66 mi) north-west of Warsaw.

The gmina covers an area of 126.7 square kilometres (48.9 sq mi), and as of 2006 its total population is 6,041.

== Villages ==
Gmina Gozdowo contains the villages and settlements of Antoniewo, Białuty, Bombalice, Bonisław, Bronoszewice, Cetlin, Czachorowo, Czachowo, Czarnominek, Dzięgielewo, Głuchowo, Gnaty, Golejewo, Gozdowo, Kolczyn, Kowalewo Podborne, Kowalewo-Boguszyce, Kowalewo-Skorupki, Kozice, Kuniewo, Kurówko, Kurowo, Lelice, Lisewo Duże, Lisewo Małe, Lisice-Folwark, Łysakowo, Miodusy, Ostrowy, Reczewo, Rękawczyn, Rempin, Rogienice, Rogieniczki, Rycharcice, Smorzewo, Stradzewo, Węgrzynowo, Zakrzewko and Zbójno.

== Neighbouring gminas ==
Gmina Gozdowo is bordered by the gminas of Bielsk, Brudzeń Duży, Mochowo, Sierpc, Stara Biała and Zawidz.
