= Chorab =

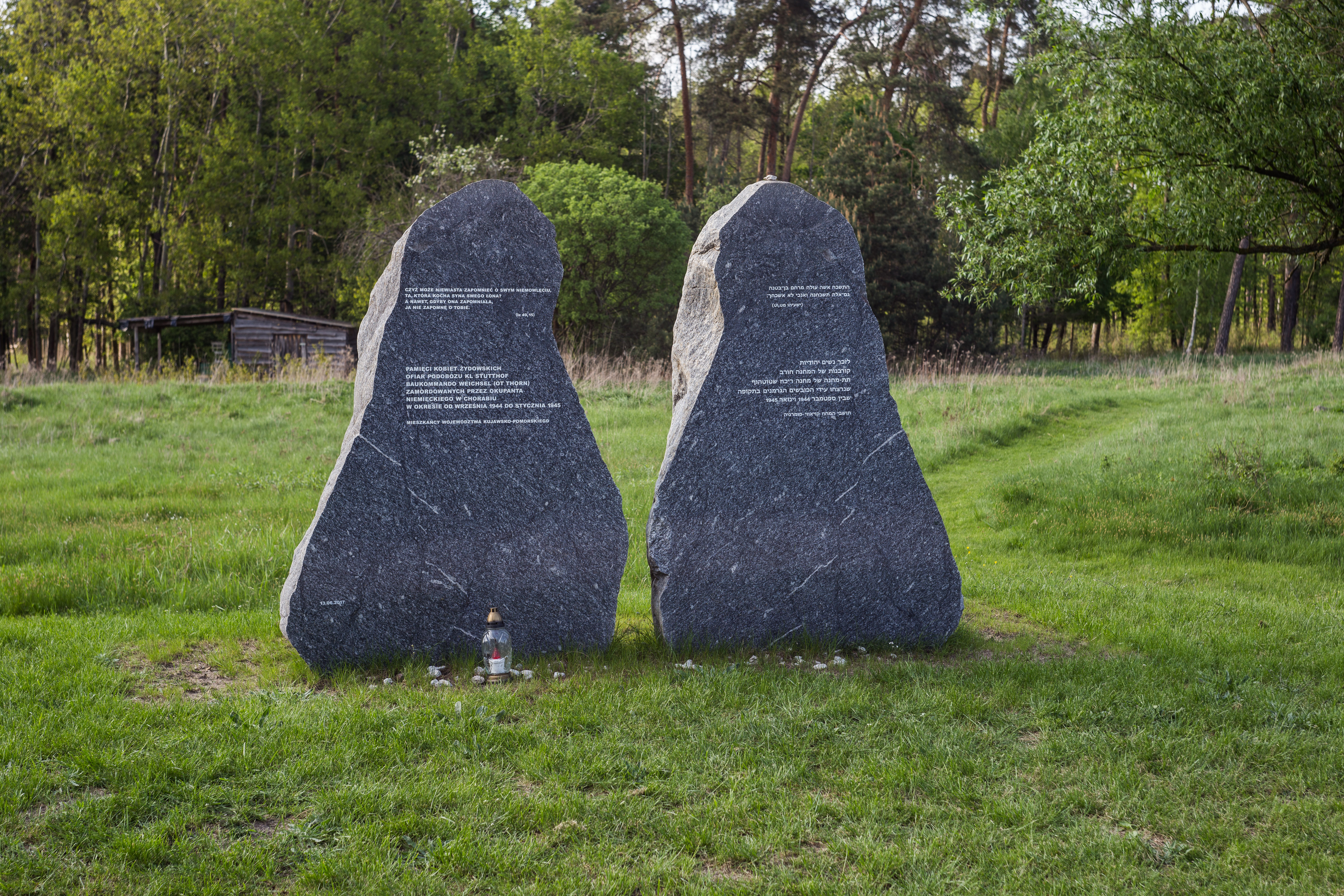
- Monument to the memory of Jewish women murdered in the branch of the German Stutthof concentration camp located here at the end of World War II.

- Location within Poland
- Coordinates: 53°04′34″N 18°29′43″E
- Country: Poland
- Voivodeship: Kuyavian-Pomeranian
- County: Toruń
- Gmina: Łysomice

Chorab [ˈxɔrap] is a village in the administrative district of Gmina Łysomice, within Toruń County, Kuyavian-Pomeranian Voivodeship, in north-central Poland.

During the Second World War it was the location of a subcamp of Stutthof concentration camp.
