= Kowalewo-Boguszyce =

Village in Masovian Voivodeship, Poland

- Village
- Location within Poland
- Coordinates: 52°44′54″N 19°41′54″E
- Country: Poland
- Voivodeship: Masovian
- County: Sierpc
- Gmina: Gozdowo
- Population: 60
- Time zone: UTC+1 (CET)
  - Summer (DST): UTC+2 (CEST)
- Vehicle registration: WSE

Kowalewo-Boguszyce [kɔvaˈlɛvɔ bɔɡuˈʂɨt͡sɛ] is a village in the administrative district of Gmina Gozdowo, within Sierpc County, Masovian Voivodeship, in north-central Poland.
