= Kamionki Duże =

- Village
- Location within Poland
- Coordinates: 53°07′00″N 18°43′00″E
- Country: Poland
- Voivodeship: Kuyavian-Pomeranian
- County: Toruń
- Gmina: Łysomice

Kamionki Duże [kaˈmjɔnki ˈduʐɛ] is a village in the administrative district of Gmina Łysomice, within Toruń County, Kuyavian-Pomeranian Voivodeship, in north-central Poland.

It is the seventh largest town in the Łysomice commune.
