= Tylice, Toruń County =

Tylice
- Village
- Location within Poland
- Coordinates: 53°6′N 18°40′E
- Country: Poland
- Voivodeship: Kuyavian-Pomeranian
- County: Toruń
- Gmina: Łysomice
- Population: 200

Tylice [tɨˈlit͡sɛ] is a village in the administrative district of Gmina Łysomice, within Toruń County, Kuyavian-Pomeranian Voivodeship, in north-central Poland.
