= Będargowo, Choszczno County =

Będargowo
- Village
- Location within Poland
- Coordinates: 53°1′26″N 15°22′4″E
- Country: Poland
- Voivodeship: West Pomeranian
- County: Choszczno
- Gmina: Pełczyce

Będargowo [bɛndarˈɡɔvɔ] is a village in the administrative district of Gmina Pełczyce, within Choszczno County, West Pomeranian Voivodeship, in north-western Poland. It lies approximately 5 km (3 mi) south-east of Pełczyce, 16 km (10 mi) south of Choszczno, and 69 km (43 mi) south-east of the regional capital Szczecin.

For the history of the region, see History of Pomerania.
