= Kowróz =

- Village
- Location within Poland
- Coordinates: 53°8′N 18°35′E
- Country: Poland
- Voivodeship: Kuyavian-Pomeranian
- County: Toruń
- Gmina: Łysomice

Kowróz [ˈkɔvrus] is a village in the administrative district of Gmina Łysomice, within Toruń County, Kuyavian-Pomeranian Voivodeship, in north-central Poland.
