= Rękawczyn, Masovian Voivodeship =

Rękawczyn
- Village
- Location within Poland
- Coordinates: 52°44′N 19°39′E
- Country: Poland
- Voivodeship: Masovian
- County: Sierpc
- Gmina: Gozdowo
- Time zone: UTC+1 (CET)
  - Summer (DST): UTC+2 (CEST)
- Vehicle registration: WSE

Rękawczyn [rɛŋˈkaft͡ʂɨn] is a village in the administrative district of Gmina Gozdowo, within Sierpc County, Masovian Voivodeship, in north-central Poland.
