= Różankowo =

- Village
- Location within Poland
- Coordinates: 53°05′29″N 18°32′15″E
- Country: Poland
- Voivodeship: Kuyavian-Pomeranian
- County: Toruń
- Gmina: Łysomice

Różankowo [ruʐaŋˈkɔvɔ] is a village in the administrative district of Gmina Łysomice, within Toruń County, Kuyavian-Pomeranian Voivodeship, in north-central Poland.
