= Lisicki =

Lisicki, (feminine: Lisicka) is a Polish toponymic surname derived from many places named Lisice. Notable people with the surname include:

- Barbara Lisicki, British disability rights activist, comedian, and equality trainer
- Sabine Lisicki (born 1989), German tennis player
