= Wytrębowice =

- Village
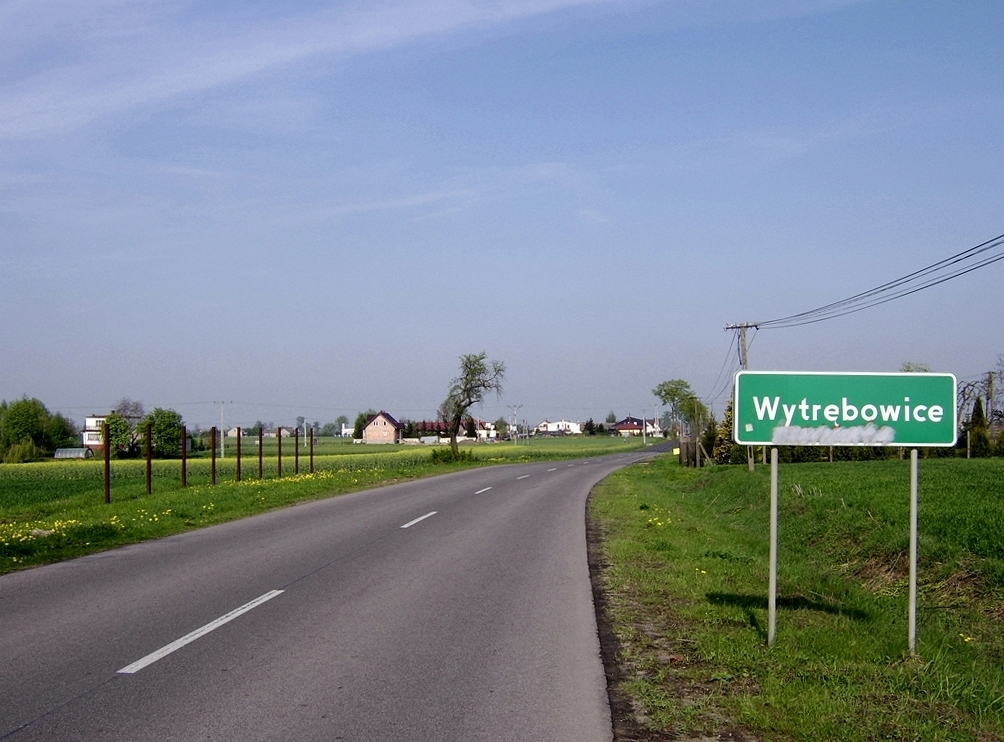
- Entrance to the Village of Wytrębowice, Poland

- Location within Poland
- Coordinates: 53°07′11″N 18°36′10″E
- Country: Poland
- Voivodeship: Kuyavian-Pomeranian
- County: Toruń
- Gmina: Łysomice

Wytrębowice [vɨtrɛmbɔˈvit͡sɛ] is a village in the administrative district of Gmina Łysomice, within Toruń County, Kuyavian-Pomeranian Voivodeship, in north-central Poland.
