= Institute of Astronomy, NCU =

Observatory in Poland

Institute of Astronomy
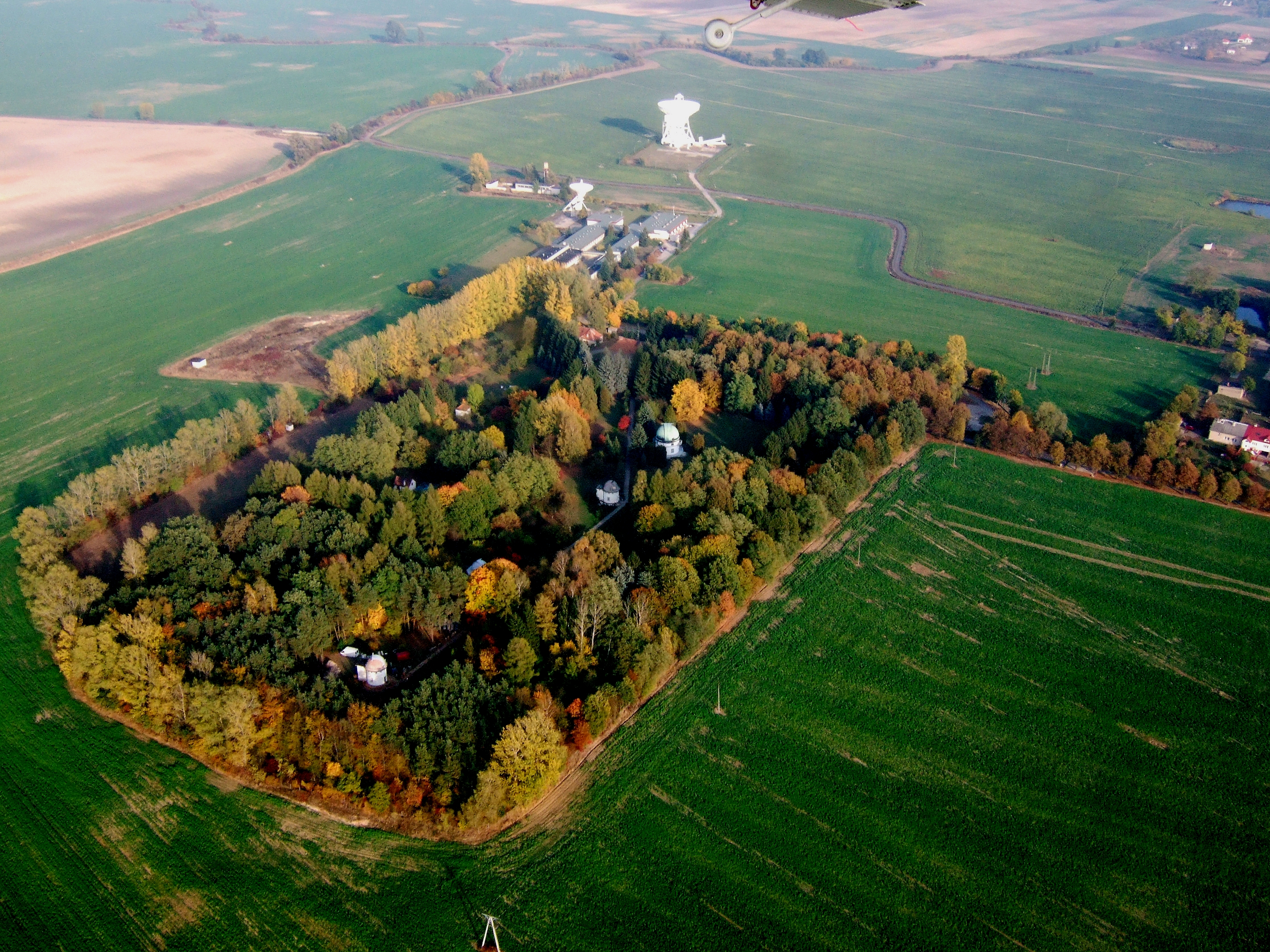
- Alternative names: Toruń Centre for Astronomy
- Organization: Nicolaus Copernicus University in Toruń
- Observatory code: 092
- Location: Toruń, Kuyavian–Pomeranian Voivodeship, Poland
- Coordinates: 53°05′43″N 18°33′46″E
- Altitude: 94 m (308 ft)
- Established: 1947
- Website: www.ca.umk.pl
- Telescopes: Henry Draper's telescope; Toruń RT3; Toruń RT4
- Location of Institute of Astronomy
- Related media on Commons

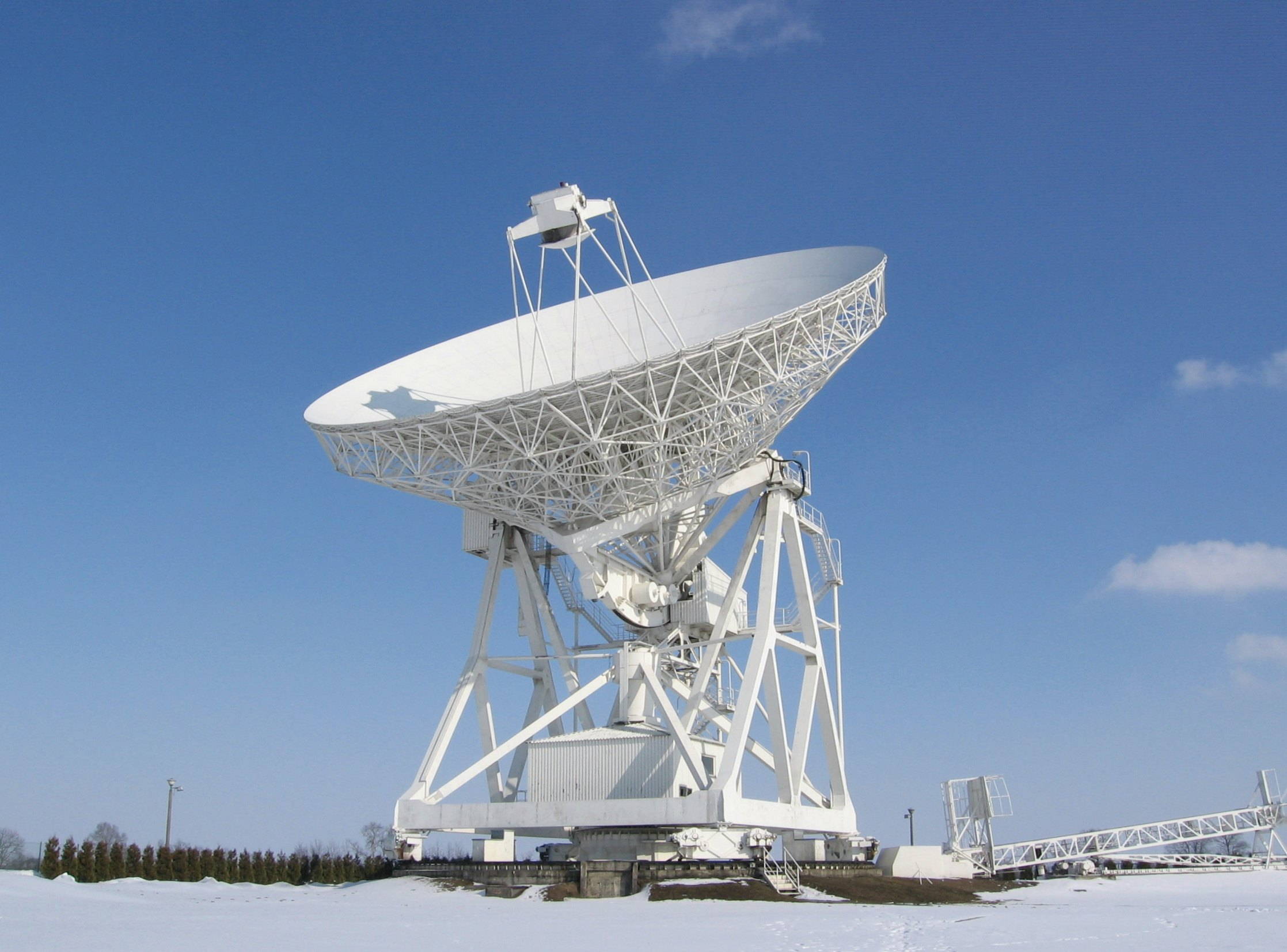
Toruń 32-metre antenna – RT4

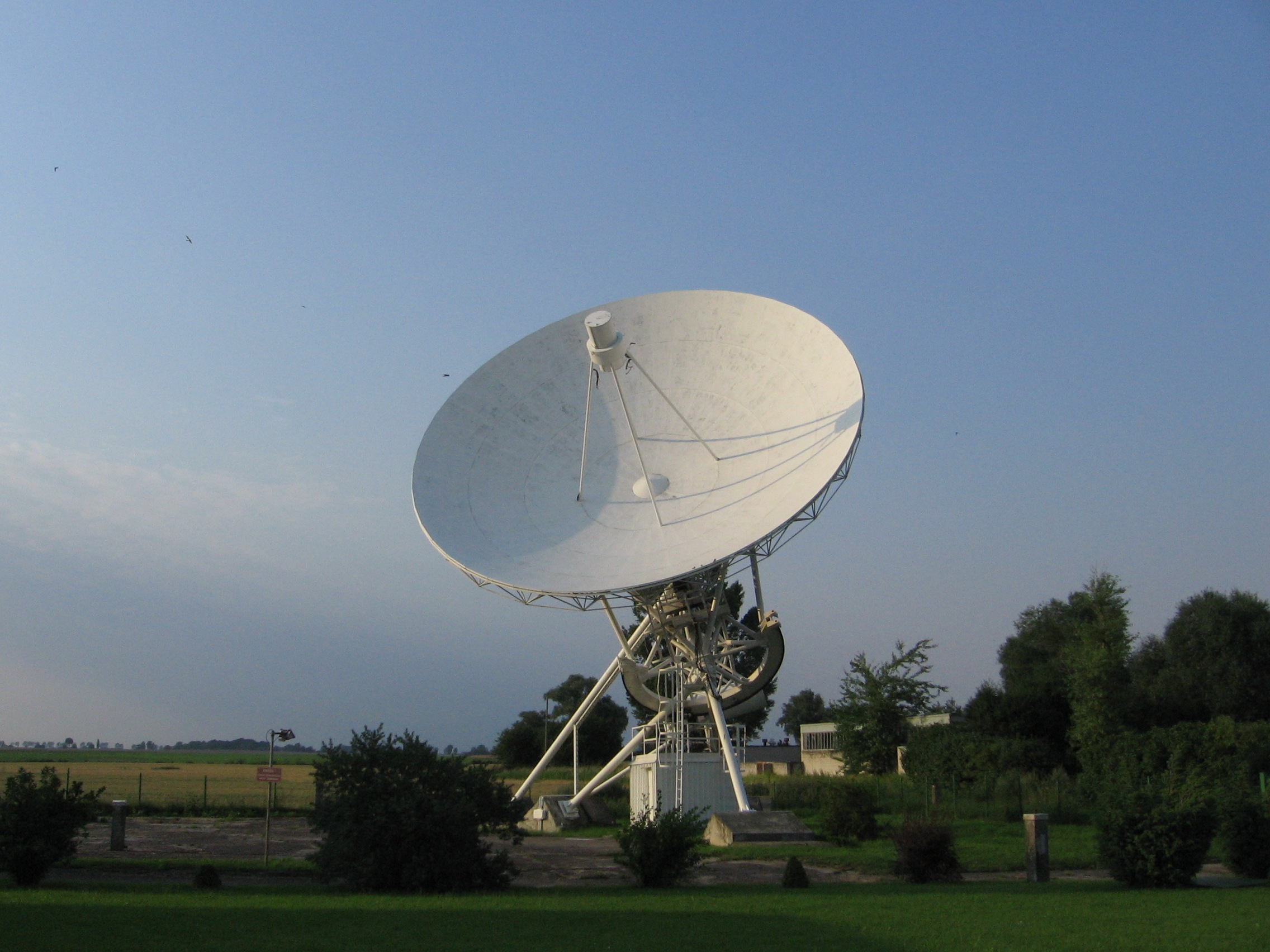
Toruń 15-metre antenna – RT3

The Institute of Astronomy of Nicolaus Copernicus University in Toruń, known prior to 1 October 2019 in scientific publications as the Toruń Centre for Astronomy, is an optical and radio observatory located at (53°5′42.9″N 18°33′45.9″E) in Piwnice, about 15 km north of Toruń, Poland. It houses two single-dish antenna telescopes, 32 metres and 15 metres in diameter, as well as the largest Polish optical telescope – 90 cm Schmidt-Cassegrain camera. The facility is operated by the Nicolaus Copernicus University. Also, photometry using 60 cm Cassegrain telescope is made and radio measurements of the Sun at 127 MHz frequency have been recorded on a daily basis since 1958 using a 23 m interferometer.

== Radio astronomy ==
Since 1981 the observatory has been a part of worldwide network of radio telescopes participating in VLBI (Very Long Baseline Interferometry). The 32 m telescope is a 620-ton construction designed by Zygmunt Bujakowski based on initial geometric parameters created by Dr Jerzy Usowicz. It is used in VLBI experiments, as well as spectroscopic, flux, polarisation measurements and pulsar observations. Currently receivers for frequencies 1.4–1.8 GHz, 5 GHz, 6.5 GHz, 10.8 GHz and 30 GHz are in use.

The 15 m telescope is used for training students of the Nicolaus Copernicus University.

The observatory's role as a VLBI station is unique in central/eastern Europe. International collaboration and involvement in various European research projects is the major activity of this department. The research concentrates on observations and theoretical interpretation of physical processes in compact active regions of radio galaxies and quasars, observational cosmology, the timing of pulsars, the search for new planetary systems and Solar System studies. In addition, the development of instrumentation for radio astronomy (ultra low noise receivers, spectrometers, frequency converters, digital electronics, control systems) is also a significant part of activities in the observatory. From 1997 to 2019, the Department of Radio Astronomy was a part of what was known in publications as the Toruń Centre for Astronomy, at the Faculty of Physics, Astronomy and Applied Informatics of the Nicolaus Copernicus University in Toruń. From 1998, the department undertook the additional function of a National Facility with a major aims of serving Polish astronomers and emphasizing international cooperation.

Reorganisation of the university in the context of the 2018–2019 Law on higher education and science (Poland) led to the closing of the administrative structures of the Department of Radio Astronomy and the Department of Astronomy and Astrophysics. The astronomy research centre, without substructures, was recreated as the Institute of Astronomy starting on 1 October 2019.

== WASP-3c & TTV ==
Transit Timing Variation (TTV), a variation on the transit method, was used to discover an exoplanet WASP-3c by Rozhen Observatory, Jena Observatory, and Toruń Centre for Astronomy.

== See also ==
- List of radio telescopes
