= Łysomice, Kuyavian-Pomeranian Voivodeship =

Łysomice
- Village
- Donimirski Palace in Łysomice

- Location within Poland
- Coordinates: 53°5′N 18°37′E
- Country: Poland
- Voivodeship: Kuyavian-Pomeranian
- County: Toruń
- Gmina: Łysomice
- Population: 1,100
- Time zone: UTC+1 (CET)
  - Summer (DST): UTC+2 (CEST)
- Vehicle registration: CTR

Łysomice (Polish pronunciation: [wɨsɔˈmit͡sɛ]) is a village in Toruń County, Kuyavian-Pomeranian Voivodeship, in north-central Poland. It is the seat of the gmina (administrative district) called Gmina Łysomice. It is located in the Chełmno Land in the historic region of Pomerania.

The most notable landmark of the village is the Donimirski Palace, a former residence of the Polish noble family of Donimirski.

== History ==
The village dates back to prehistoric times, and remains of prehistoric burials were found in the village. In 1457, Polish King Casimir IV Jagiellon granted the village to the nearby city of Toruń as reward for the city's participation in the Thirteen Years' War (1454–1466) against the Teutonic Knights. In 1649, the village suffered a fire. In the late-18th-century Partitions of Poland the village was annexed by Prussia. The city then sold the village to the Polish noble family of Prądzyński, who eventually sold it to nobleman Edward Donimirski. In 1807, the village was included within the newly established but short-lived Polish Duchy of Warsaw, in 1815 it was re-annexed by Prussia, in 1871 it became part of Germany, and following World War I, it was reintegrated with Poland, as the country regained independence. During the German occupation of Poland (World War II), local Polish nobleman and landowner Jan Donimirski was executed by the Germans in nearby Toruń on November 3, 1939, during the Intelligenzaktion.

== Notable residents ==
- Georg Wilhelm von Braunschweig (1845-1911), Prussian Infantry General
