= Zęgwirt =

- Village
- Location within Poland
- Coordinates: 53°07′53″N 18°36′22″E
- Country: Poland
- Voivodeship: Kuyavian-Pomeranian
- County: Toruń
- Gmina: Łysomice

Zęgwirt [ˈzɛŋɡvirt] is a village in the administrative district of Gmina Łysomice, within Toruń County, Kuyavian-Pomeranian Voivodeship, in north-central Poland.
