= Kowrózek =

- Village
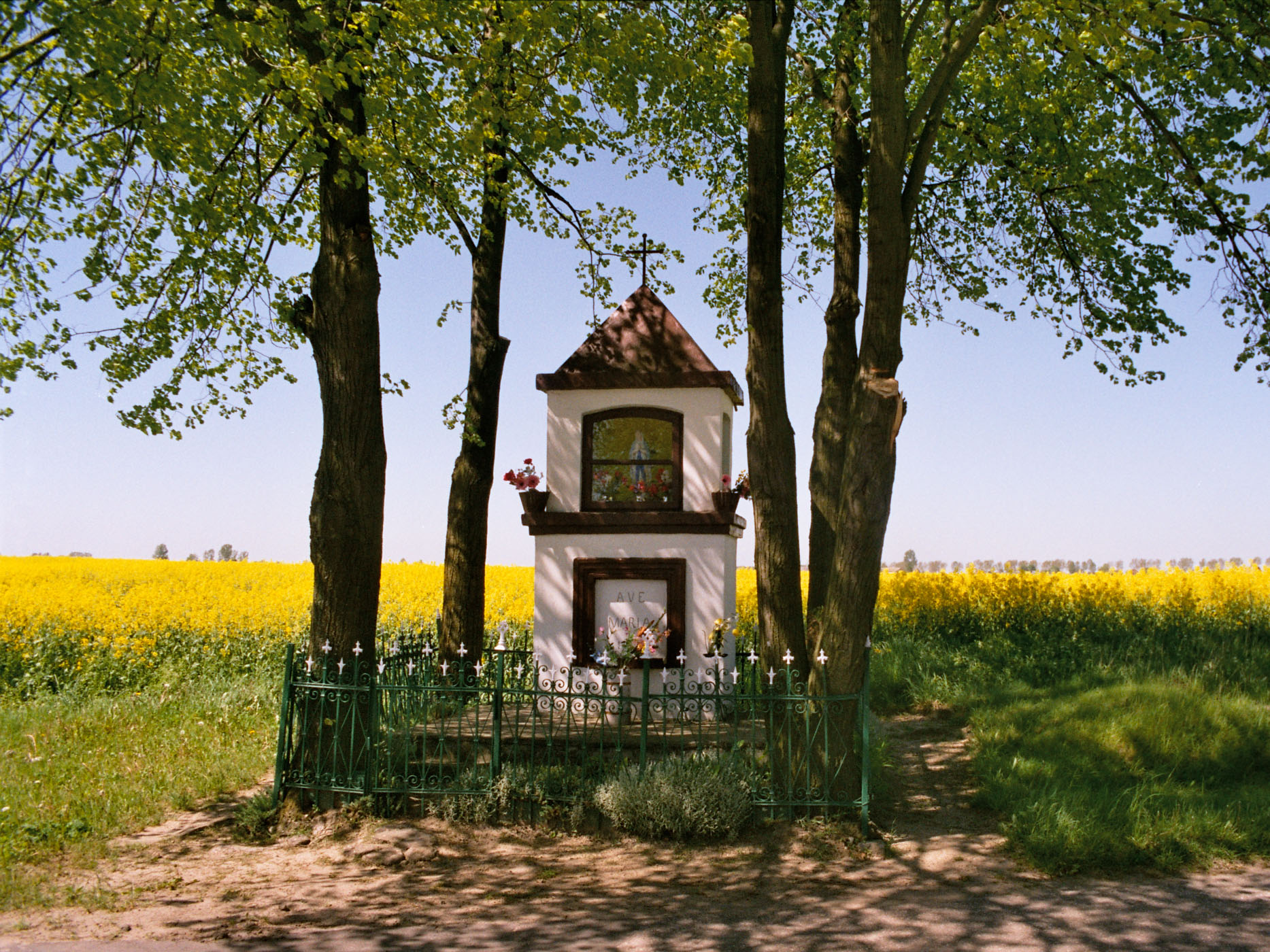
- Wayside shrine in Kowrózek

- Location within Poland
- Coordinates: 53°06′00″N 18°33′00″E
- Country: Poland
- Voivodeship: Kuyavian-Pomeranian
- County: Toruń
- Gmina: Łysomice

Kowrózek [kɔˈvruzɛk] is a village in the administrative district of Gmina Łysomice, within Toruń County, Kuyavian-Pomeranian Voivodeship, in north-central Poland.
