= Vincenc Beneš =

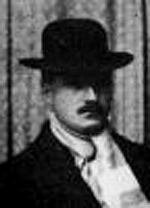
- Beneš before 1920
- Born: 22 January 1883; Lišice, Bohemia, Austria-Hungary
- Died: 27 March 1979 (aged 96); Prague, Czechoslovakia
- Education: College of Applied Arts in Prague; Academy of Fine Arts, Prague
- Occupation: Painter

Vincenc Beneš (22 January 1883 – 27 March 1979) was a Czech painter.

== Early life and education ==
Beneš was born in Lišice, Bohemia, Austria-Hungary. He studied at the Academy of Arts, Architecture and Design in Prague from 1902 to 1904 and the Academy of Fine Arts, Prague from 1904 to 1907.

== Career ==
From 1909 to 1911, and again from 1917 to 1949 he was a member of the Mánes Union of Fine Arts. His style was initially influenced by cubism and fauvism, and he later formed realistic oil paintings, showing the effect of Neo-Classicism. He contributed to the Art Monthly periodical.

Among his most important works include a series of landscapes for the National Theatre and some battlefields in France.

In 1963, he was named a National Artist.

== Death ==
He died in 1979 in Prague.

== See also ==
- List of Czech painters
