= Ostaszewo, Kuyavian-Pomeranian Voivodeship =

Ostaszewo
- Village
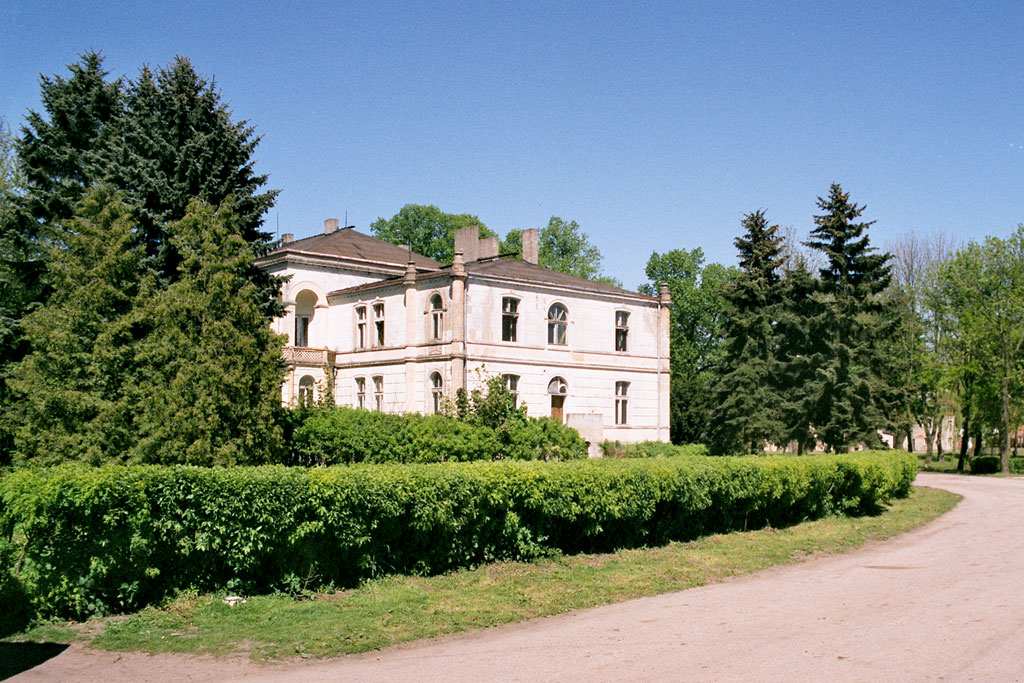
- Manor house in Ostaszewo

- Location within Poland
- Coordinates: 53°6′44″N 18°37′45″E
- Country: Poland
- Voivodeship: Kuyavian-Pomeranian
- County: Toruń
- Gmina: Łysomice

Ostaszewo [ɔstaˈʂɛvɔ] is a village in the administrative district of Gmina Łysomice, within Toruń County, Kuyavian-Pomeranian Voivodeship, in north-central Poland.
