= Gmina Pełczyce =

Gmina Pełczyce Pełczyce Commune
- Gmina
- Coat of arms
- Interactive map of Gmina Pełczyce
- Coordinates (Pełczyce): 53°2′36″N 15°18′19″E
- Country: Poland
- Voivodeship: West Pomeranian
- County: Choszczno
- Seat: Pełczyce

Area
  - Total: 200.81 km^{2} (77.53 sq mi)

Population (2006)
  - Total: 8,100
  - Density: 40/km^{2} (100/sq mi)
  - Urban: 2,698
  - Rural: 5,402
- Website: https://www.pelczyce.pl/

Gmina Pełczyce is an urban-rural gmina (administrative district) in Choszczno County, West Pomeranian Voivodeship, in north-western Poland. Its seat is the town of Pełczyce, which lies approximately 16 kilometres (10 mi) south-west of Choszczno and 64 km (40 mi) south-east of the regional capital Szczecin.

The gmina covers an area of 200.81 square kilometres (77.5 sq mi), and as of 2006 its total population is 8,100 (out of which the population of Pełczyce amounts to 2,698, and the population of the rural part of the gmina is 5,402).

The gmina contains part of the protected area called Barlinek-Gorzów Landscape Park.

== Villages ==
Apart from the town of Pełczyce, Gmina Pełczyce contains the villages and settlements of Będargowiec, Będargowo, Boguszyny, Bolewice, Brzyczno, Bukwica, Chrapowo, Dolne, Dubielewo, Golejewo, Jagów, Jarosławsko, Kępiniec, Krzynki, Lubiana, Lubianka, Ługowo, Łyskowo, Nadarzyn, Niesporowice, Płotno, Przekolno, Przyłęki, Puszczyn, Sarnik, Sułkowo, Trynno, Trzęsacz and Wierzchno.

== Neighbouring gminas ==
Gmina Pełczyce is bordered by the gminas of Barlinek, Choszczno, Dolice, Krzęcin and Strzelce Krajeńskie.
