= Bronoszewice =

- Village
- Location within Poland
- Coordinates: 52°43′00″N 19°43′00″E
- Country: Poland
- Voivodeship: Masovian
- County: Sierpc
- Gmina: Gozdowo
- Time zone: UTC+1 (CET)
  - Summer (DST): UTC+2 (CEST)
- Vehicle registration: WSE

Bronoszewice [brɔnɔʂɛˈvit͡sɛ] is a village in the administrative district of Gmina Gozdowo, within Sierpc County, Masovian Voivodeship, in north-central Poland.
