= Wierzchno, Choszczno County =

Wierzchno
- Village
- Location within Poland
- Coordinates: 53°1′7″N 15°16′37″E
- Country: Poland
- Voivodeship: West Pomeranian
- County: Choszczno
- Gmina: Pełczyce

Wierzchno [ˈvjɛʂxnɔ] is a village in the administrative district of Gmina Pełczyce, within Choszczno County, West Pomeranian Voivodeship, in north-western Poland. It lies approximately 4 km (2 mi) south-west of Pełczyce, 19 km (12 mi) south-west of Choszczno, and 64 km (40 mi) south-east of the regional capital Szczecin.

For the history of the region, see History of Pomerania.
