= Piwnice, Kuyavian-Pomeranian Voivodeship =

Piwnice
- Village
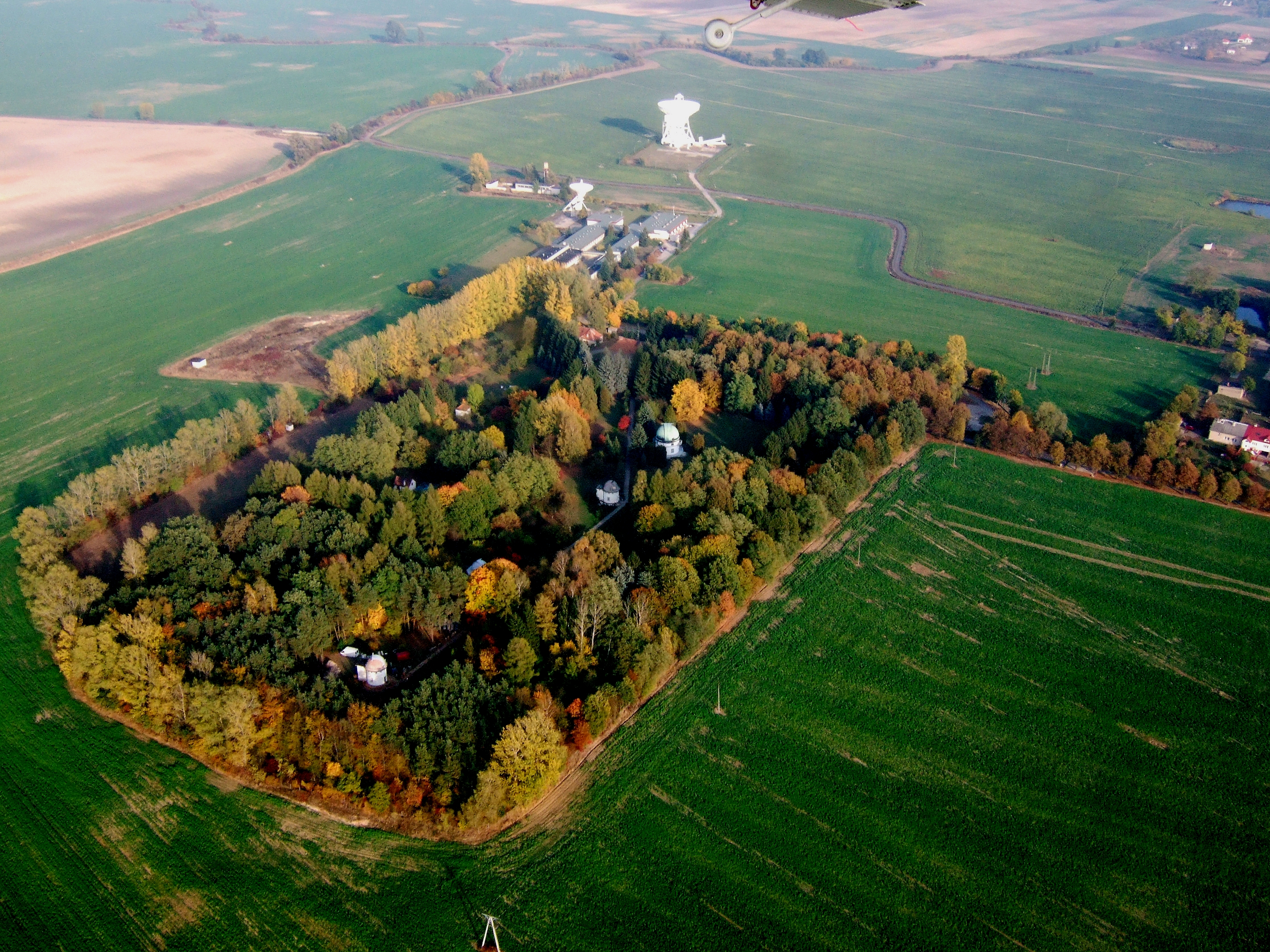
- Aerial view of Piwnice

- Location within Poland
- Coordinates: 53°5′28″N 18°33′29″E
- Country: Poland
- Voivodeship: Kuyavian-Pomeranian
- County: Toruń
- Gmina: Łysomice
- Population: 300
- Time zone: UTC+1 (CET)
  - Summer (DST): UTC+2 (CEST)
- Vehicle registration: CTR

Piwnice [pivˈnit͡sɛ] is a village in the administrative district of Gmina Łysomice, within Toruń County, Kuyavian-Pomeranian Voivodeship, in north-central Poland. It is located in the Chełmno Land in the historic region of Pomerania.

The village is the site of Piwnice radio observatory.
