= Świerczyny, Kuyavian-Pomeranian Voivodeship =

Świerczyny
- Village
- Location within Poland
- Coordinates: 53°6′20″N 18°32′54″E
- Country: Poland
- Voivodeship: Kuyavian-Pomeranian
- County: Toruń
- Gmina: Łysomice

Świerczyny (Polish pronunciation: [ɕfjɛrˈt͡ʂɨnɨ]) is a village in the administrative district of Gmina Łysomice, within Toruń County, Kuyavian-Pomeranian Voivodeship, in north-central Poland.
