= Świerczynki, Toruń County =

Świerczynki
- Village
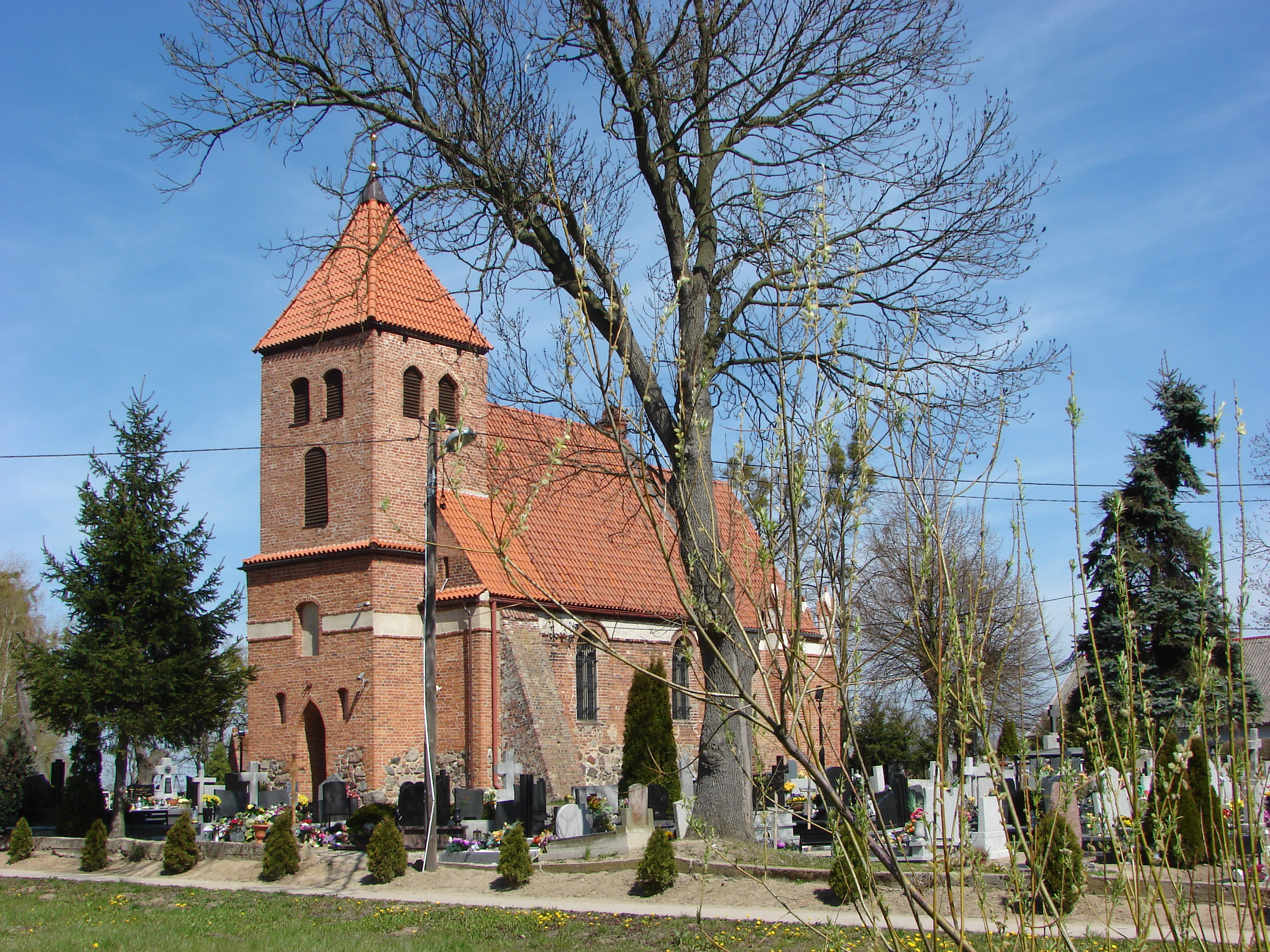
- Parish church of Saint John the Baptist, built turn 13th-14th century.

- Location within Poland
- Coordinates: 53°6′N 18°32′E
- Country: Poland
- Voivodeship: Kuyavian-Pomeranian
- County: Toruń
- Gmina: Łysomice
- Population: 120

Świerczynki (Polish pronunciation: [ɕfjɛrˈt͡ʂɨnkʲi]) is a village in the administrative district of Gmina Łysomice, within Toruń County, Kuyavian-Pomeranian Voivodeship, in north-central Poland.
