= Turzno, Toruń County =

Turzno
- Village
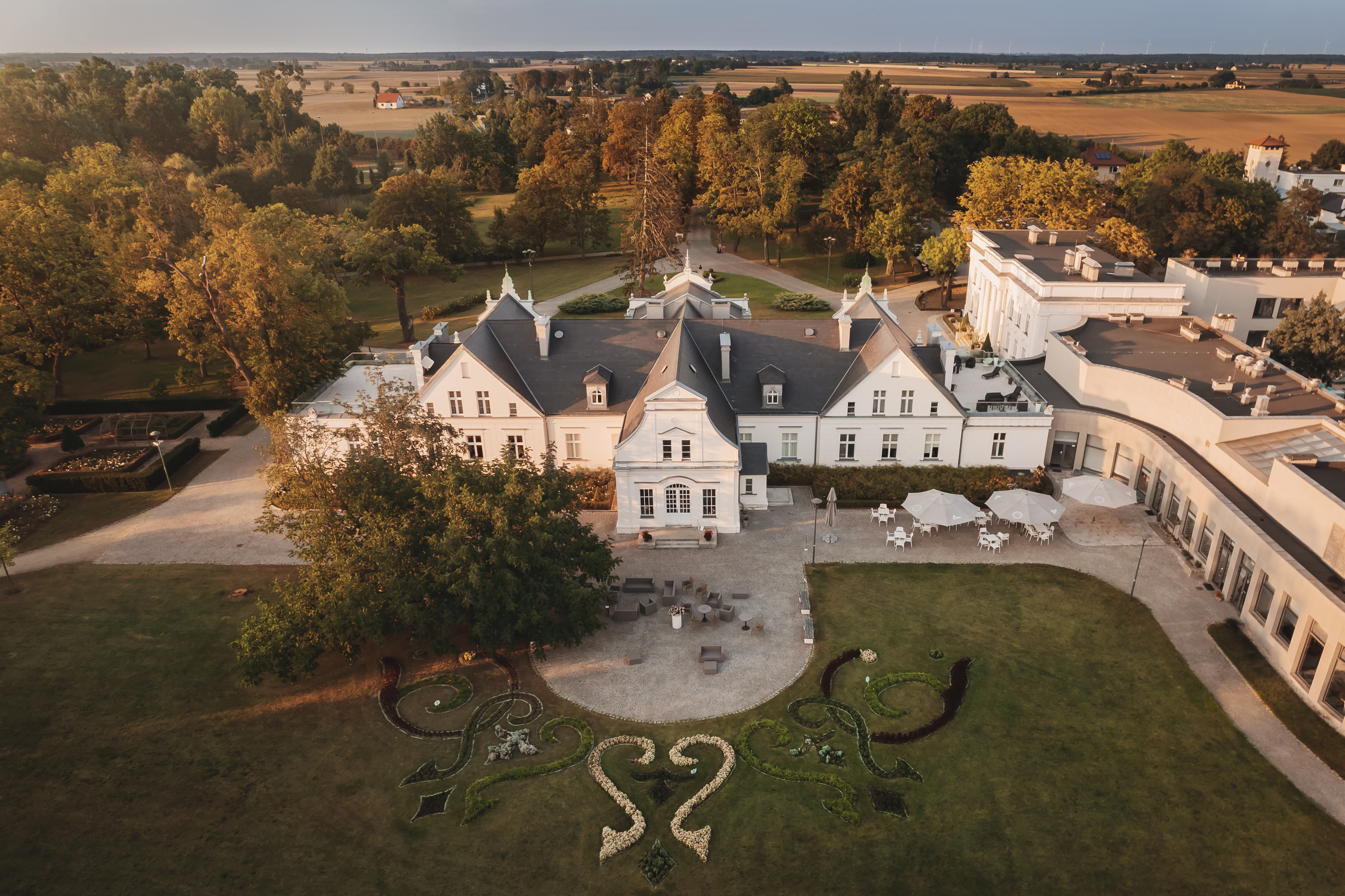
- The manor house, built in the mid 19th century.

- Location within Poland
- Coordinates: 53°6′24″N 18°43′58″E
- Country: Poland
- Voivodeship: Kuyavian-Pomeranian
- County: Toruń
- Gmina: Łysomice
- Population: 960
- Website: http://www.turzno.pl

Turzno [ˈtuʐnɔ] is a village in the administrative district of Gmina Łysomice, within Toruń County, Kuyavian-Pomeranian Voivodeship, in north-central Poland.
