= Golejewo, Choszczno County =

Golejewo
- Village
- Location within Poland
- Coordinates: 52°57′31″N 15°17′31″E
- Country: Poland
- Voivodeship: West Pomeranian
- County: Choszczno
- Gmina: Pełczyce
- Population: 9

Golejewo [ɡɔlɛˈjɛvɔ] is a village in the administrative district of Gmina Pełczyce, within Choszczno County, West Pomeranian Voivodeship, in north-western Poland. It lies approximately 10 km (6 mi) south of Pełczyce, 25 km (16 mi) south of Choszczno, and 70 km (43 mi) south-east of the regional capital Szczecin.

For the history of the region, see History of Pomerania.

The village has a population of nine people.
