= Trzęsacz, Choszczno County =

Trzęsacz
- Village
- Location within Poland
- Coordinates: 53°2′N 15°19′E
- Country: Poland
- Voivodeship: West Pomeranian
- County: Choszczno
- Gmina: Pełczyce
- Population: 120

Trzęsacz [ˈtʂɛ̃sat͡ʂ] is a village in the administrative district of Gmina Pełczyce, within Choszczno County, West Pomeranian Voivodeship, in north-western Poland. It lies approximately 2 km (1 mi) south-east of Pełczyce, 16 km (10 mi) south of Choszczno, and 65 km (40 mi) south-east of the regional capital Szczecin.

For the history of the region, see History of Pomerania.

The village has a population of 120.
