= Lišice =

- Municipality
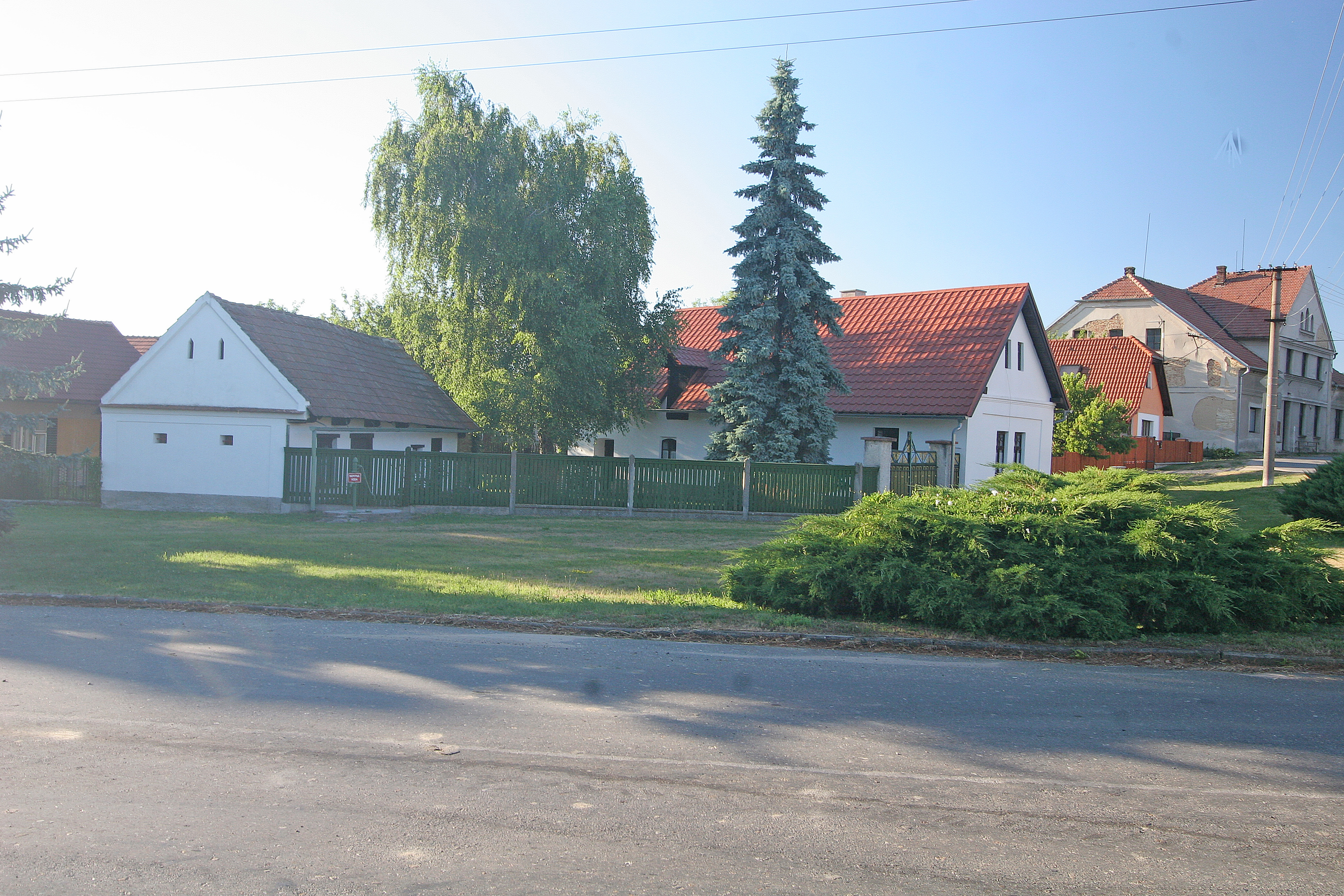
- Houses in Lišice

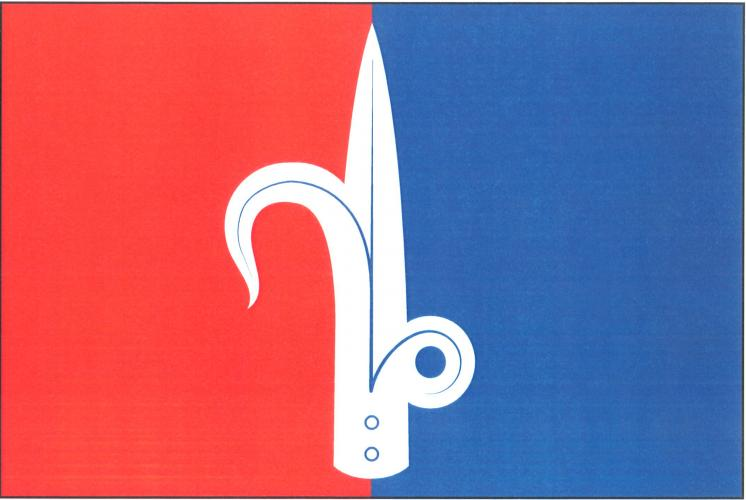
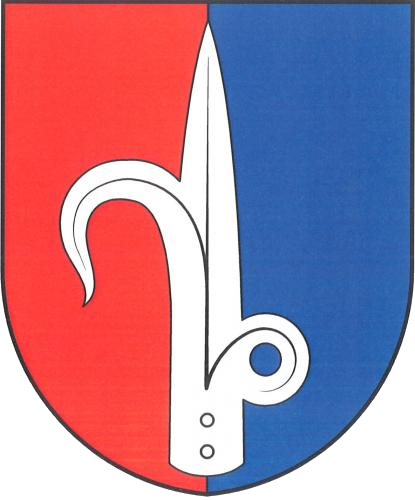
- Flag Coat of arms

- Location in the Czech Republic
- Coordinates: 50°10′52″N 15°24′29″E
- Country: Czech Republic
- Region: Hradec Králové
- District: Hradec Králové
- First mentioned: 1394

Area
  - Total: 6.41 km^{2} (2.47 sq mi)
- Elevation: 254 m (833 ft)

Population (2026-01-01)
  - Total: 165
  - Density: 25.7/km^{2} (66.7/sq mi)
- Time zone: UTC+1 (CET)
  - Summer (DST): UTC+2 (CEST)
- Postal code: 503 51
- Website: www.lisice.eu

Lišice is a municipality and village in Hradec Králové District in the Hradec Králové Region of the Czech Republic. It has about 200 inhabitants.

== Demographics ==
Historical population
Year	Pop.	±%
1869	422	—
1880	453	+7.3%
1890	442	−2.4%
1900	406	−8.1%
1910	468	+15.3%
1921	484	+3.4%
1930	533	+10.1%
1950	430	−19.3%
1961	433	+0.7%
1970	365	−15.7%
1980	302	−17.3%
1991	237	−21.5%
2001	188	−20.7%
2011	177	−5.9%
2021	168	−5.1%
Source: Censuses

== Notable people ==
- Vincenc Beneš (1883–1979), painter
