= Zakrzewko, Kuyavian-Pomeranian Voivodeship =

Zakrzewko
- Village
- Location within Poland
- Coordinates: 53°5′53″N 18°38′34″E
- Country: Poland
- Voivodeship: Kuyavian-Pomeranian
- County: Toruń
- Gmina: Łysomice

Zakrzewko [zaˈkʂɛfkɔ] is a village in the administrative district of Gmina Łysomice, within Toruń County, Kuyavian-Pomeranian Voivodeship, in north-central Poland.

In the years 1975 – 1998, the village administratively belonged to Toruń Voivodeship.
