= Papowo Toruńskie =

- Village
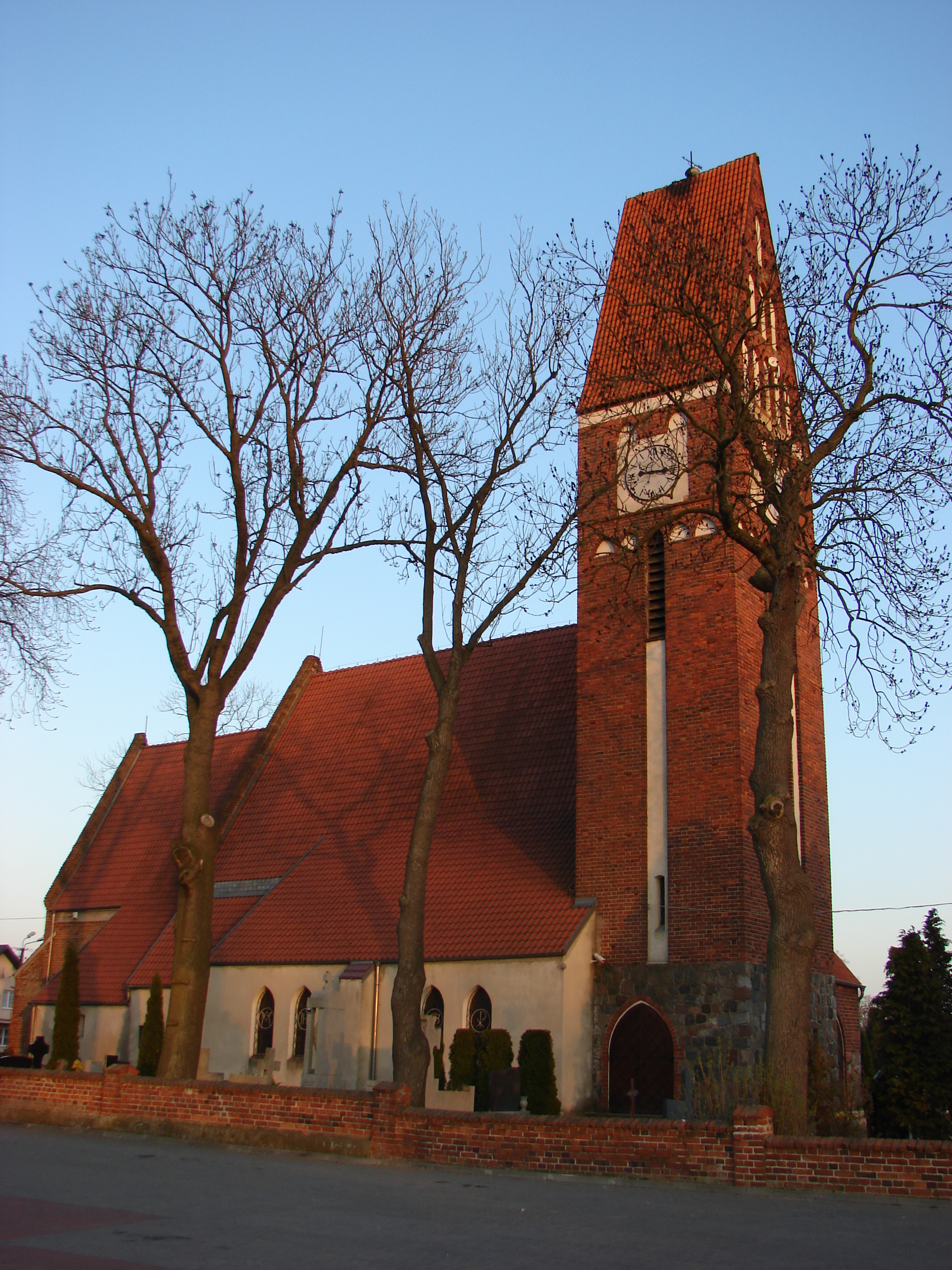
- Parish church of St Nicholas, built before 1300.

- Location within Poland
- Coordinates: 53°4′17.4″N 18°37′40.8″E
- Country: Poland
- Voivodeship: Kuyavian-Pomeranian
- County: Toruń
- Gmina: Łysomice
- Population: 1,100

Papowo Toruńskie [paˈpɔvɔ tɔˈruɲskʲɛ] is a village in the administrative district of Gmina Łysomice, within Toruń County, Kuyavian-Pomeranian Voivodeship, in north-central Poland.
