= Novo Lisiče =

Novo Lisice (Macedonian: Ново Лисиче) is a settlement in the city of Skopje, North Macedonia. It is 5 kilometres (3.1 mi) from the center of Skopje. Novo Lisice was built between 1985 and 1990. The population is 98% Macedonian, 1% Serbian and 0.5% Turkish.

== Facilities ==
It has one of the biggest grade schools in North Macedonia: Lazo Angelovski.
