= Dolno Lisiče =

Dolno Lisiče Долно Лисиче
- Village
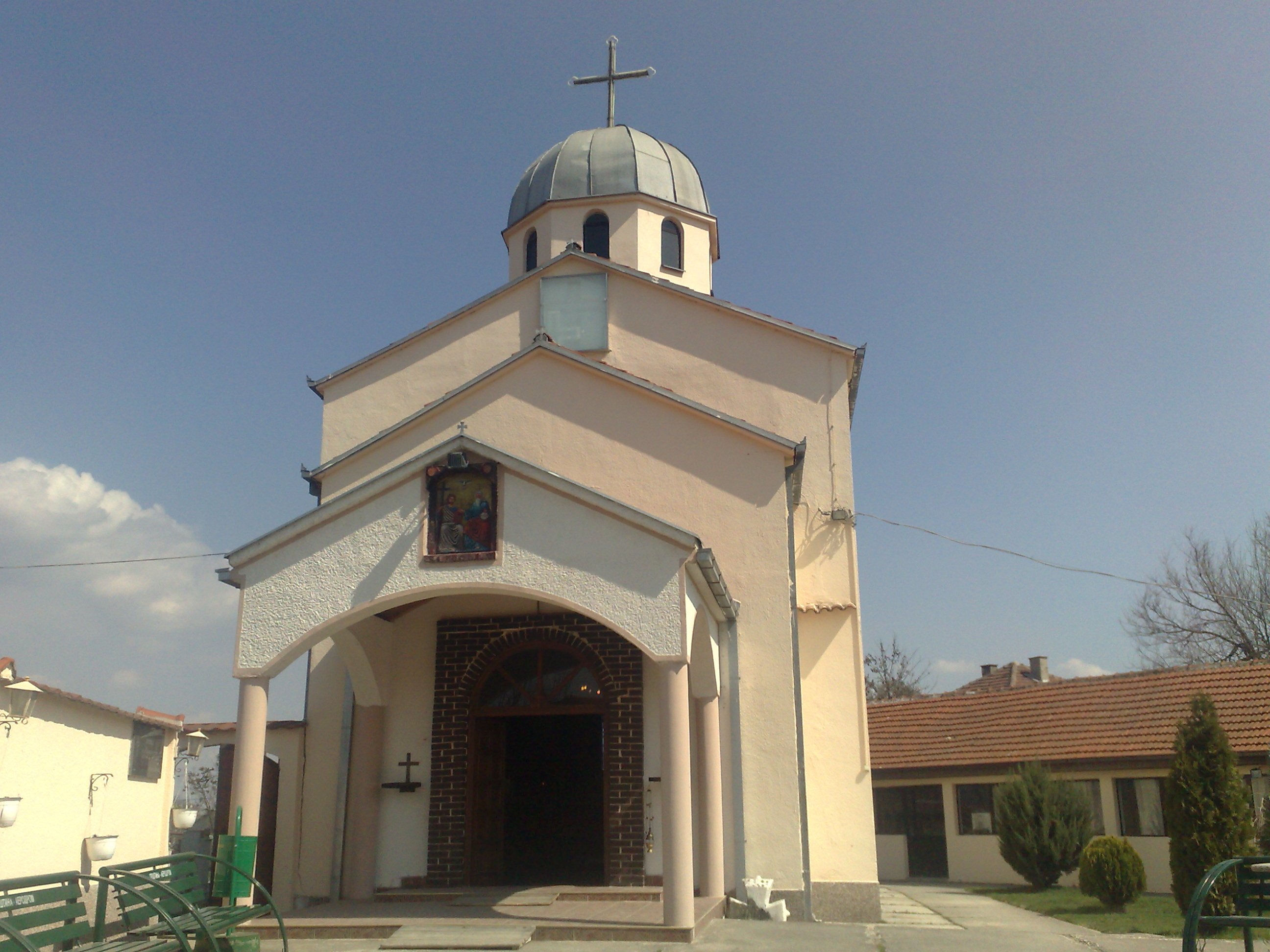

- Location in Aerodrom Municipality

- Location within North Macedonia
- Coordinates: 41°57′19″N 21°32′02″E
- Country: North Macedonia
- Region: Skopje
- Municipality: Aerodrom

Population (2021)
  - Total: 2,627
- Time zone: UTC+1 (CET)
  - Summer (DST): UTC+2 (CEST)
- Car plates: SK
- Website: .

Dolno Lisiče (Macedonian: Долно Лисиче) is a village in the municipality of Aerodrom, North Macedonia.

== Demographics ==
As of the 2021 census, Dolno Lisiče had 2,627 residents with the following ethnic composition:

- Macedonians 2,481
- Persons for whom data are taken from administrative sources 80
- Serbs 30
- Others 28

According to the 2002 census, the village had a total of 2,440 inhabitants. Ethnic groups in the village include:

- Macedonians 2,378
- Serbs 47
- Vlachs 1
- Others 14
