= Golejewo, Masovian Voivodeship =

Golejewo
- Village
- Location within Poland
- Coordinates: 52°41′38″N 19°40′46″E
- Country: Poland
- Voivodeship: Masovian
- County: Sierpc
- Gmina: Gozdowo
- Highest elevation: 124 m (407 ft)
- Lowest elevation: 119 m (390 ft)

Population
  - Total: 150
- Time zone: UTC+1 (CET)
  - Summer (DST): UTC+2 (CEST)
- Vehicle registration: WSE

Golejewo [ɡɔlɛˈjɛvɔ] is a village in the administrative district of Gmina Gozdowo, within Sierpc County, Masovian Voivodeship, in north-central Poland.
