= Lisicky =

Lisicky (Czech/Slovak masculine: Lisický; feminine: Lisická) is a surname. Notable people with the surname include:

- Helena Lisická (1930–2009), Czech ethnographer and writer
- Michael Lisicky (born 1964), American writer and oboist
- Paul Lisicky (born 1959), American novelist and memoirist
- Peter Lisicky (born 1976), American basketball player
