= Julianka, Kuyavian-Pomeranian Voivodeship =

Julianka
- Village
- Location within Poland
- Coordinates: 53°6′25″N 18°35′11″E
- Country: Poland
- Voivodeship: Kuyavian-Pomeranian
- County: Toruń
- Gmina: Łysomice

Julianka [juˈljanka] is a village in the administrative district of Gmina Łysomice, within Toruń County, Kuyavian-Pomeranian Voivodeship, in north-central Poland.
