= Pełczyce =

Town in West Pomeranian Voivodeshi, Poland

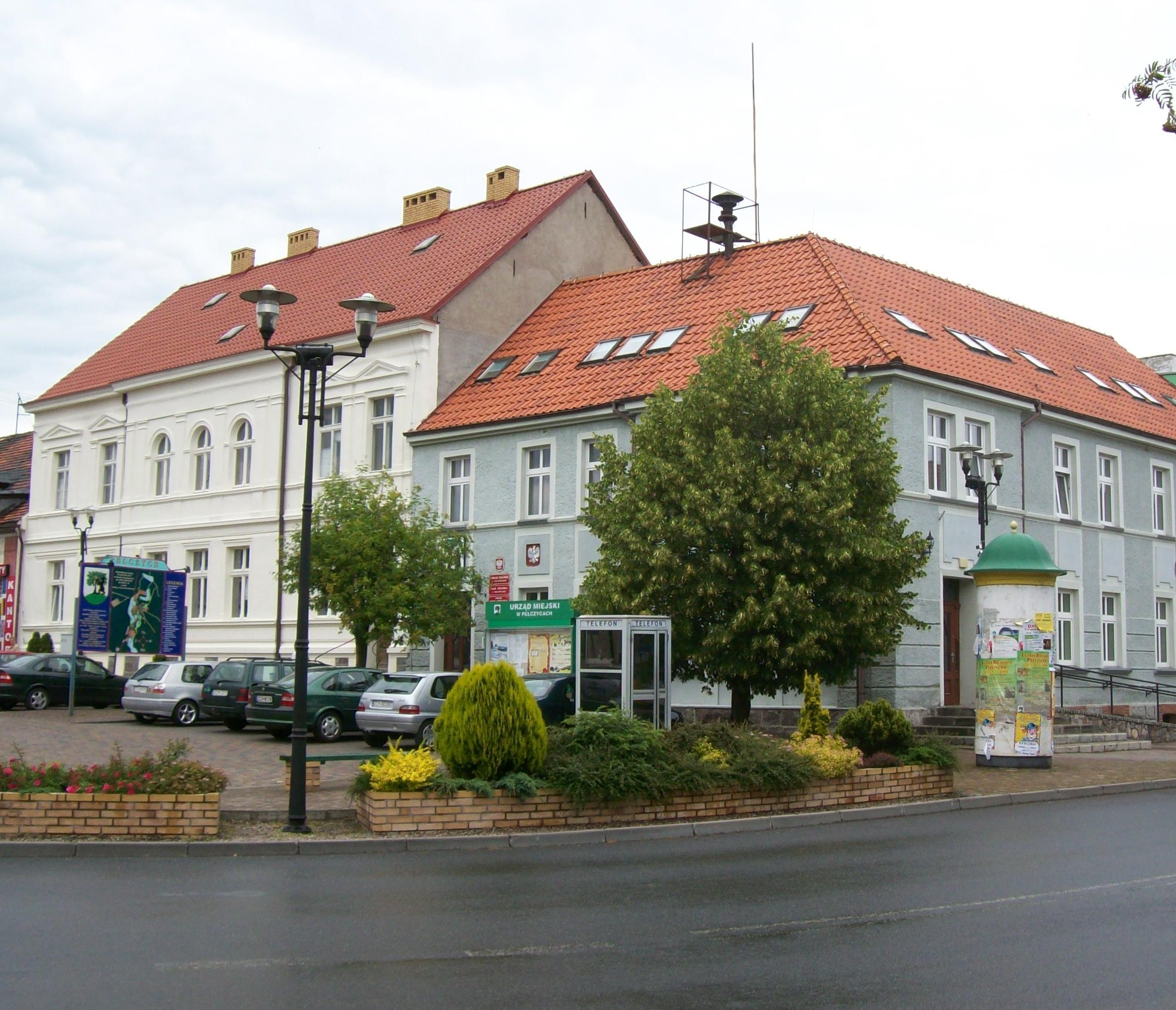
- Town hall

- Coat of arms

- Location within Poland
- Coordinates: 53°2′36″N 15°18′19″E
- Country: Poland
- Voivodeship: West Pomeranian
- County: Choszczno
- Gmina: Pełczyce

Area
  - Total: 13.07 km^{2} (5.05 sq mi)

Population (2010)
  - Total: 2,681
  - Density: 205.1/km^{2} (531.3/sq mi)
- Time zone: UTC+1 (CET)
  - Summer (DST): UTC+2 (CEST)
- Postal code: 73-260
- Vehicle registration: ZCH
- Website: http://www.pelczyce.pl

Pełczyce [pɛu̯ˈt͡ʂɨt͡sɛ] (German: Bernstein) is a town in Choszczno County, West Pomeranian Voivodeship, in western Poland, with 2,681 inhabitants (2010).

== Demographics ==
Historical population

Year	Pop.	±%
1871	2,197	—
1880	2,247	+2.3%
1890	2,189	−2.6%
1900	2,274	+3.9%
1910	2,206	−3.0%

Year	Pop.	±%
1925	2,246	+1.8%
1939	2,581	+14.9%
1950	1,098	−57.5%
1960	1,720	+56.6%
2010	2,681	+55.9%

== Transport ==
Pełczyce lies along voivodeship road 151.

The nearest railway station is in Choszczno.
