= Jan Zakrzewski =

Jan Zakrzewski may refer to:

- Jan Dołęga-Zakrzewski (1866–1936), Polish surveyor, activist and publicist
- Jan Andrzej Zakrzewski (1920–2007), Polish journalist, writer and translator
- Jan Zakrzewski (runner) (born 1970), Polish distance runner

== See also ==
- Zakrzewski
