= Zakrzewski =

Zakrzewski (feminine: Zakrzewska, plural: Zakrzewscy) is a Polish surname. At the beginning of the 1990s there were approximately 26,210 people in Poland with this surname.

People named Zakrzewski:

- Alex Zakrzewski, American television director
- Andrzej Zakrzewski (1941–2000), Polish politician
- Arseni Zakrzewski (1783–1865; Arseniy Zakrevskiy), Russian politician
- Barbara Maria Zakrzewska-Nikiporczyk (1946–2023), Polish composer and musicologist
- Bogdan Zakrzewski (1916–2011), Polish literary historian
- Dariusz Zakrzewski (born 1961), Polish cyclist
- Edward J. Zakrzewski (1965-2025), American convicted murderer and ex-soldier
- Eulalia Zakrzewska-Rolińska (born 1946), Polish sport shooter
- Henryk Zakrzewski (1897–1973), Polish politician
- Ignacy Wyssogota Zakrzewski (1745–1802), Polish nobleman and politician
- Jadwiga Zakrzewska (born 1950), Polish politician
- Jan Dołęga-Zakrzewski (1866–1936), Polish surveyor, activist and publicist
- Jan Andrzej Zakrzewski (1920–2007), Polish journalist, writer and translator
- Jan Zakrzewski (athlete) (born 1970), Polish athlete
- Janina Zakrzewska (1928–1995), Polish lawyer
- Janusz Andrzej Zakrzewski (1932–2008), Polish physicist
- Joasia Zakrzewski (born 1976), Scottish ultrarunner
- John Zakrzewski (born 1982), French pentathlete
- Julian Zakrzewski Hall (born 2008), Polish-American footballer
- Karolina Zakrzewska, Polish model
- Kazimierz Zakrzewski (1900–1941), Polish historian and publicist
- Konstanty Zakrzewski (1876–1948), Polish physicist
- Ksawery Zakrzewski (1876–1915), Polish doctor and activist
- Łukasz Zakrzewski (born 1984), Polish sailor
- Marie Elizabeth Zakrzewska (1829–1902), German-born physician
- Mirosława Zakrzewska-Kotula (1932–1990), Polish volleyball, basketball, handball player and coach
- Pierre Zakrzewski (1966–2022), Irish photographer and journalist
- Roman Zakrzewski (1955–2014), Polish painter
- Ryszard Zakrzewski (lived in the 19th century), Polish traveler, topographer and officer
- Stanisław Zakrzewski (1873–1936), Polish historian
- Stanisław Zenon Zakrzewski (1890–1976), Polish sailing activist
- Tadeusz Paweł Zakrzewski (1883–1961), Polish Catholic priest and bishop
- Wincenty Zakrzewski (1844–1918), Polish historian
- Witold Zakrzewski (1903–1987), Polish sailing activist
- Włodzimierz Zakrzewski (1916–1992), Polish painter, graphician and poster artist
- Zbigniew Zakrzewski (economist) (1912–1992), Polish economist
- Zbigniew Zakrzewski (soccer player) (born 1981), Polish football (soccer) player
- Zofia Zakrzewska (1916–1999), Polish scoutmaster

== See also ==
- Bugaj Zakrzewski, settlement in Poland
- Zakrzewska Osada, village in Poland
- Zakrzewska Wola, Grójec County, village in Poland
- Zakrzewska Wola, Radom County, village in Poland
