= Passent =

Passent is a surname. Notable people with the surname include:

- Agata Passent (born 1973), Polish journalist and writer
- Daniel Passent (1938–2022), Polish journalist and writer
