= Łucja Prus =

Polish singer

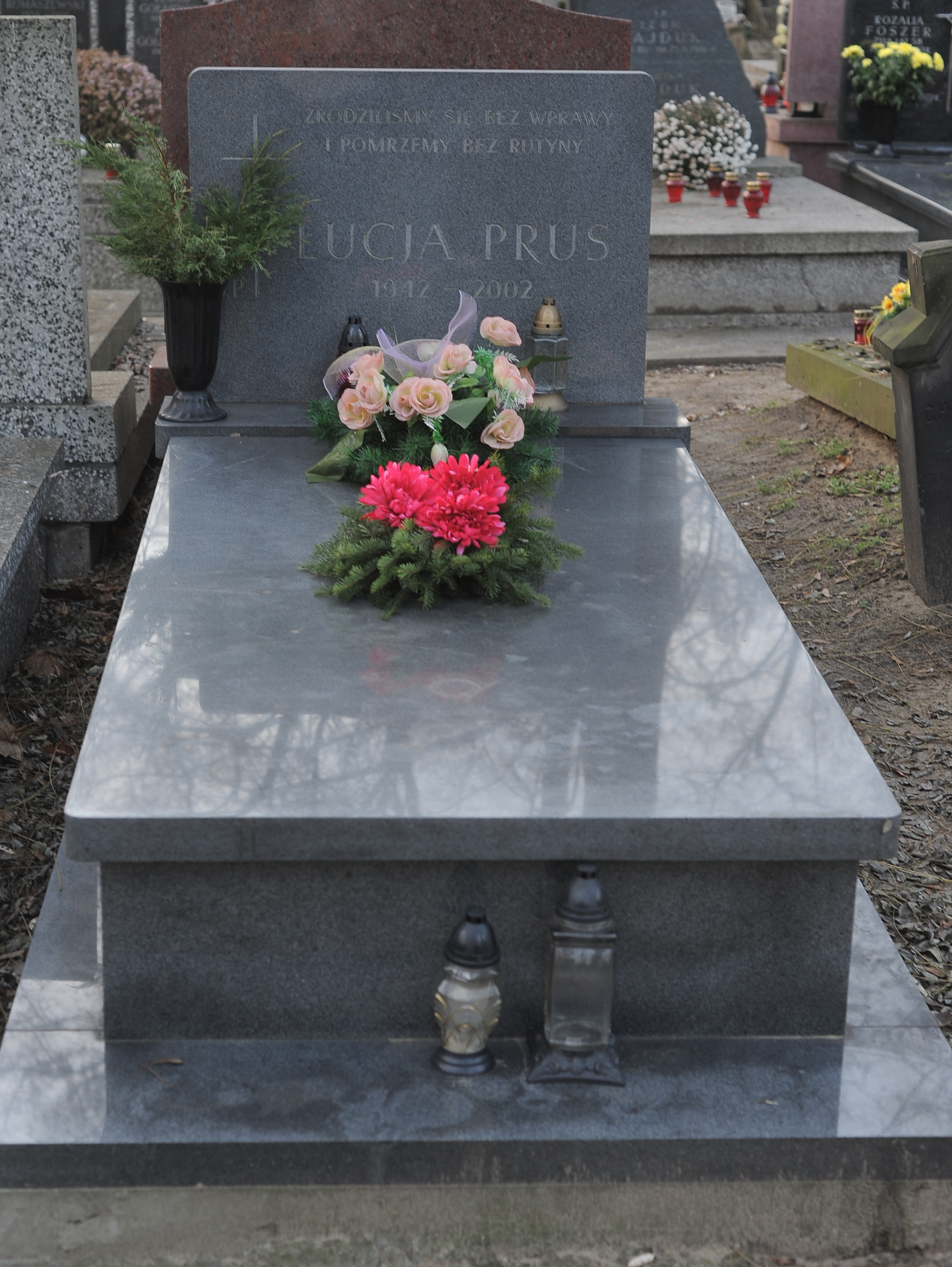
Grave of Łucja Prus, Warsaw

Łucja Weronika Prus (Białystok, 25 May 1942 - Warsaw, 3 July 2002 in Warsaw) was a Polish singer.

== Career ==
She made her musical debut at the age of 20 in mid sixties. Known for her performances on the Polish stage as well as from numerous movie and TV series soundtracks. Her best known songs include Nic dwa razy się nie zdarza (Nothing Comes Twice), Dookoła noc się stała (Night Became All Around), Twój portret (Your Portrait), W żółtych płomieniach liści (In the Yellow Flames of the Leaves), Walc chopinowski (Chopin Waltz), Tango z różą w zębach (Tango with a Rose in the Teeth) .

She collaborated with many prominent songwriters (Włodzimierz Nahorny, Jonasz Kofta, Jan Wołek, Agnieszka Osiecka), singers (Alicja Majewska, Jerzy Połomski), and bands (Skaldowie).

== Private life ==
Her first husband was Polish composer and pianist Andrzej Mundkowski. The marriage did not last and after divorce Łucja Prus married Ryszard Kozicz, music band manager (e.g., Skaldowie). Her daughter Julia was born from the latter matrimony.

She died of breast cancer in 2002 at the age of 60.

== Discography ==
- 1974 Łucja Prus
- 1978 Łucja Prus dzieciom
- 1980 Łucja Prus
- 1986 Domowe przedszkole: Piosenki dla dzieci
- 1988 Kolędy (z A. Majewską, J. Połomskim i W. Korczem)
- 1994 Dla dzieci od lat 3
- 1996 Szymborska Poems, Songs
- 1996 W dzień Bożego Narodzenia
- 1999 Złota kolekcja / Nic dwa razy się nie zdarza
- 2003 Czułość
- 2004 Platynowa kolekcja / Złote przeboje
