= Borkowo Wielkie =

Borkowo Wielkie refers to the following places in Poland:

- Borkowo Wielkie, Masovian Voivodeship
- Borkowo Wielkie, West Pomeranian Voivodeship
