= Statue of Agnieszka Osiecka =

Statue in Warsaw, Poland

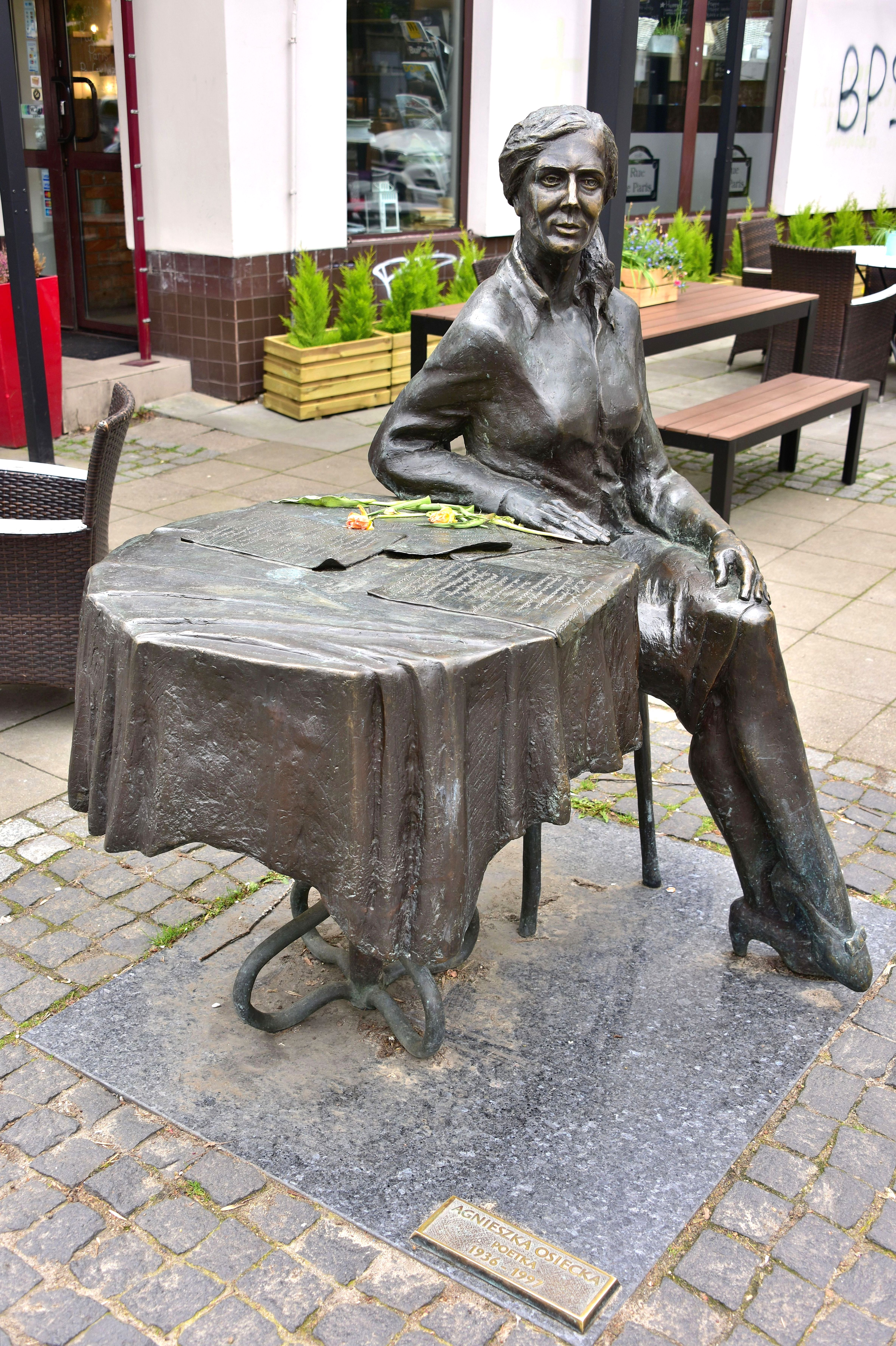
- The sculpture in 2017.
- Interactive map of Statue of Agnieszka Osiecka
- Location: 20 Obronców Street, Praga-South, Warsaw, Poland
- Coordinates: 52°14′19.20″N 21°03′08.02″E
- Designer: Dariusz Kowalski; Teresa Pastuszka-Kowalska
- Type: Statue
- Material: Bronze
- Opening date: 19 May 2007
- Dedicated to: Agnieszka Osiecka

The statue of Agnieszka Osiecka (Polish pronunciation: [aɡˈɲɛʂka ɔˈɕɛt͡ska]; Polish: Pomnik Agnieszki Osieckiej) is a bronze statue in Warsaw, Poland, placed at 20 Obronców Street, at the corner with Francuska Street, within the neighbourhood of Saska Kępa in the district of Praga-South. It is dedicated to Agnieszka Osiecka, a 20th-century poet, songwriter, and novelist. The sculpture was designed by Dariusz Kowalski and Teresa Pastuszka-Kowalska, and unveiled on 19 May 2007.

== History ==
The monument was designed Dariusz Kowalski and Teresa Pastuszka-Kowalska, and unveiled on 19 May 2007, during the annual local festival in the neighbourhood of Saska Kępa. The sculpture was placed in front of a coffeehouse, which since then have been replaced with a supermarket. Osiecka used to live in the area, and been a regular to a different nearby coffeehouse Sax at 31 Francuska Street.

== Design ==
The bronze statue depicts Agnieszka Osiecka siting on a chair next to a table, with one leg on another. She is depicted wearing skirt shirt, and heels, and with tied hair. On the table in front of her are placed several paper cards with song lyrics.
