= I Love Poland =

I Love Poland (Polish: Kocham Polskę) may refer to:

- "I Love Poland", a 2011 song by DJ Hazel
- I Love Poland, a social campaign by far-right group All-Polish Youth
- I Love Poland, a 2009 film at the GoEast independent film festival
