= Agnieszka Osiecka =

Polish poet, songwriter (1936–1997)

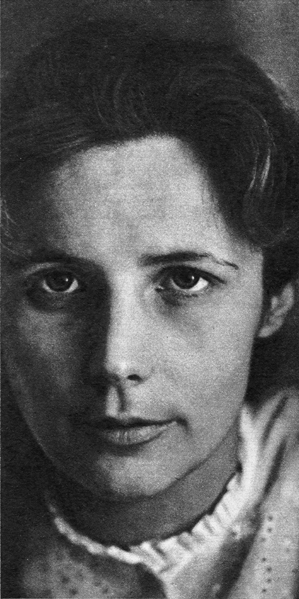
- Osiecka in 1965
- Born: 9 October 1936; Warsaw, Poland
- Died: 7 March 1997 (aged 60); Warsaw, Poland
- Resting place: Powązki Cemetery
- Occupations: Poet, writer, author of theatre and television screenplays, film director and journalist
- Spouse: Wojciech Frykowski 1963–1964, Wojciech Jesionka 1966
- Children: Agata Passent
- Writing career
- Language: Polish
- Notable awards: Cross of Merit 1979

Agnieszka Osiecka (Polish pronunciation: [aɡˈɲɛʂka ɔˈɕɛt͡ska]; 9 October 1936 – 7 March 1997) was a Polish poet, writer, author of theatre and television screenplays, film director and journalist. She was a prominent Polish songwriter, having authored the lyrics to more than 2000 songs, and is considered an icon of Polish culture.

== Life and career ==
Osiecka was born in Warsaw, the only child of Wiktor Osiecki, a pianist and composer of Serbian, Romanian-Vlach and Hungarian descent, and a scholar Maria Sztechman. She spent her early years in Zakopane where her father played the piano at the Watra Restaurant. After World War II the Osiecki family moved to Warsaw and settled in the Saska Kępa borough. The small flat soon became Osiecka's favourite place to work. She lived there almost her entire life. After her death, the Okularnicy Foundation placed a commemorative plaque on the building.

Agnieszka was exceptionally gifted. She completed her coursework much more quickly than other students and graduated from Marie Skłodowska-Curie High School in 1952. She trained as a swimmer at Legia Sports Club and studied journalism at the University of Warsaw (1957–61) and film-directing at the prestigious National Film School in Łódź (1957–61) but dropped film-directing and started writing. Osiecka published essays and articles in the student press during her university years. She joined the famous Student Satirical Theatre (STS) in 1954 and wrote 166 political and lyrical songs for this company. She used to say "I am a journalist, that is why some of my songs are reports which rhyme." She served on the artistic board of the STS Theatre until it closed in 1972.

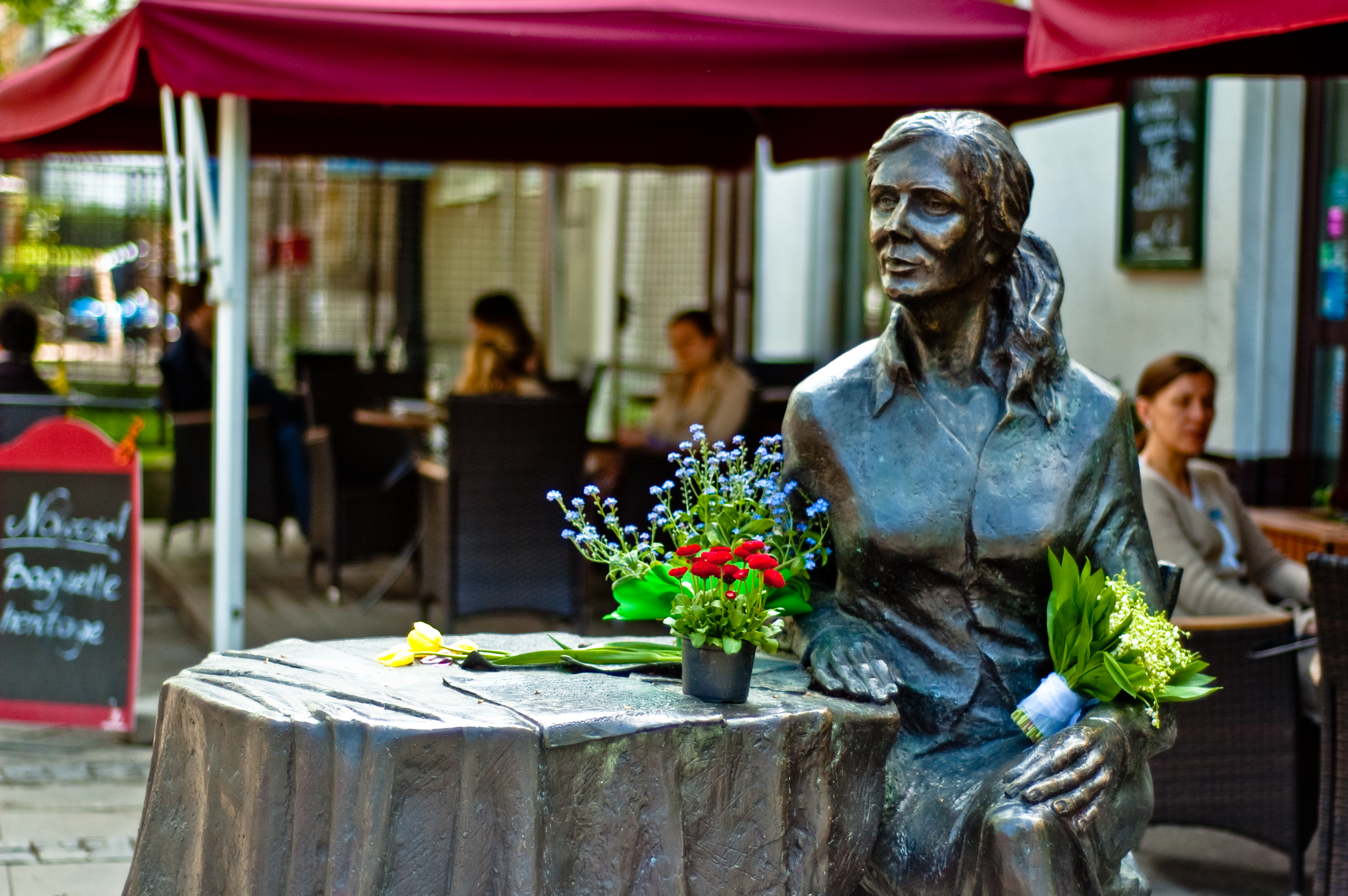
Agnieszka Osiecka monument in Warsaw

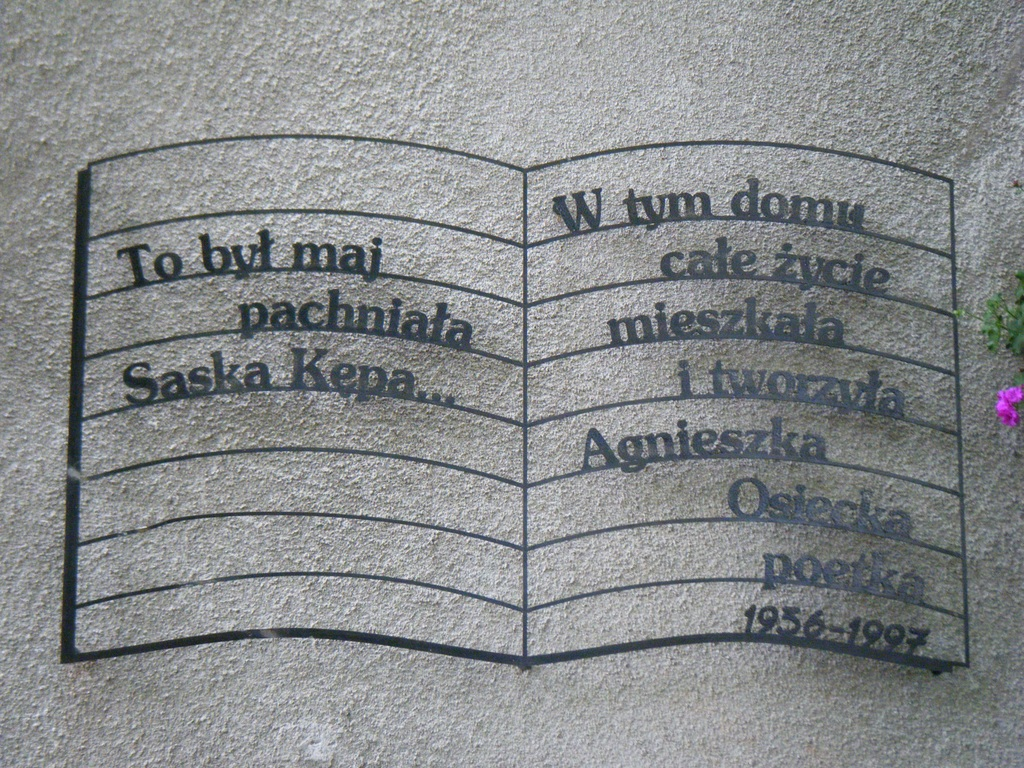
Commemorative plaque at Osiecka's home in Warsaw

1962 marked her debut on Polish National Radio. Renown Polish actress Kalina Jędrusik sang Osiecka's lyrics to a hit song by Franciszka Leszczyńska called "My First Ball" (Mój pierwszy bal). One year later at the first National Festival of Polish Song in Opole in 1963 Agnieszka achieved a major success winning the main prize and six other prizes for her lyrics: "Piosenka o Okularnikach“ (music by Jarosław Abram), as well as "Białe małżeństwo,“ "Czerwony kapturek,“ "Kochankowie z ulicy Kamiennej,“ "Solo na kontrabasie“ and "Ulice wielkich miast.“

She was now recognised as a prominent young poet and the Polish National Radio offered her a job to create and lead a team to broadcast The Radio Song Studio. She also worked on theatre and television productions. Together with composer Adam Sławiński she wrote a series called "Listy śpiewające“ ("Singing Letters“). Her first major theatre show "Niech no tylko zakwitną jabłonie“ ("Let the Apple-trees Bloom") was staged at the Ateneum Theatre.

Her lyrics were set to music by such composers as Krzysztof Komeda, Seweryn Krajewski, Adam Sławiński, Zygmunt Konieczny, and others.

== Personal life ==
Osiecka and her partner, the prominent journalist Daniel Passent, had their only child, a daughter, Agata, in 1973.

The Masurian Lake District was among Osiecka's favorite places in Poland. She liked to vacation there in the 1960s/70s with Polish intellectuals and artists. As a student she worked there for one of the local newspapers and in the autumn of her life she wrote for the Atelier Theatre in Sopot. She was a frequent visitor to the Halama writers' retreat house in Zakopane, in the Tatra Mountains.

== Death and legacy ==
Osiecka published numerous books and released many records (see the full list at www.okularnicy.org.pl). She is considered one of the most important, prolific and gifted persons in postwar Polish culture and history. Osiecka died on 7 March 1997.

The Agnieszka Osiecka Okularnicy Foundation was founded by her daughter shortly after the poet's death. The Okularnicy Foundation promotes Osiecka's work, runs the Poet's Archive, organizes the annual singing competition "Let us Remember Agnieszka Osiecka“, manages the Internet archive and publishes books.

To honour her creative output and her work at the National Polish Radio, the Music Studio was named after Osiecka in 1997.

In 2013, the National Bank of Poland (NBP) issued two commemorative coins (2 and 10-zloty denominations) as part of the "History of Polish popular music" series honouring Osiecka.

In 2020, the Polish public broadcaster Telewizja Polska released an eponymous biographical mini-series chronicling the life and work of Osiecka. It was directed by Robert Gliński and Michał Rosa and stars Eliza Rycembel and Magdalena Popławska as the titular character.

From May 2024, the manuscript of text of song Małgośka from the collection of the National Library of Poland is presented at a permanent exhibition in the Palace of the Commonwealth.

== State honours ==
- Commander's Cross with Star of the Order of Polonia Restituta (posthumously, 1997)
- Gold Cross of Merit (1979)

== Selected songs ==
- A ja wolę moją mamę (music by Majka Jeżowska, performed by Majka Jeżowska)
- Ballada o pancernych (music by Adam Walaciński, performed by Edmund Fetting)
- Ballada wagonowa (music by Andrzej Zieliński, performed by Maryla Rodowicz)
- Będę czekać (music by Michel Legrand, performed by Stenia Kozłowska)
- Biedne badyliszcze (performed by Krystyna Sienkiewicz)
- Bossanova do poduszki (music by Jacek Mikuła, performed by Maryla Rodowicz)
- Cyrk nocą (music by Jacek Mikuła, performed by Maryla Rodowicz)
- Czarodzieje (music by Andrzej Zieliński, performed by Skaldowie)
- Damą być (music by Jacek Mikuła, performed by Maryla Rodowicz)
- Diabeł i raj (music by Katarzyna Gärtner, performed by Maryla Rodowicz)
- Dobranoc panowie (music by Andrzej Zieliński, performed by Maryla Rodowicz)
- Dość jest wszystkiego (co-written with Jacek Kleyff, performed by Maryla Rodowicz and Jacek Kleyff)
- Dookoła noc się stała (music by Adam Sławiński, performed by Łucja Prus)
- Dzikuska (music by Leszek Bogdanowicz, performed by Violetta Villas, Katarzyna Groniec)
- Dziś prawdziwych Cyganów już nie ma (music by Andrzej Zieliński, performed by Maryla Rodowicz, Edyta Górniak)
- Ja mam szczęście do wszystkiego (music by Lucjan Maria Kaszycki, performed by Hanna Rek)
- Jak pięknie jest umierać między gołębiami (music by Andrzej Zieliński, performed by Grażyna Łobaszewska)
- Jeżeli jest (muz. Janusz Bogacki, performed by Magda Umer)
- Kiedy mi przyjdzie zasnąć na dłużej (music by Violetta Villas, performed by Violetta Villas)
- Kiedyś byłam lalką (performed by Krystyna Sienkiewicz)
- Kochankowie z ulicy Kamiennej (music by Wojciech Solarz, performed by Sława Przybylska, Krystyna Tkacz, Elżbieta Czyżewska and Anna Prucnal)
- Kolega Maj (music by Jan Ptaszyn Wróblewski, performed by Ewa Bem)
- Komu weselne dzieci (music by Katarzyna Gärtner, performed by Urszula Sipińska)
- Króliczek (music by Andrzej Zieliński, performed by Skaldowie, Katarzyna Groniec)
- Ludzkie gadanie (music by Seweryn Krajewski, performed by Maryla Rodowicz)
- Małgośka (music by Katarzyna Gärtner, performed by Maryla Rodowicz)
- Mechaniczna lalka (music by Violetta Villas, performed by Violetta Villas)
- Mój pierwszy bal (music by Franciszka Leszczyńska, performed by Kalina Jędrusik)
- Mówiłam żartem (music by Jarosław Abramow, performed by Iga Cembrzyńska and Krystyna Janda)
- Na całych jeziorach – ty (music by Adam Sławiński, performed by Teresy Tutinas, Kalina Jędrusik, Hanna Banaszak, Katarzyna Nosowska)
- Najpiękniejsza (music by Seweryn Krajewski, performed by Seweryn Krajewski)
- Na zakręcie (music by Przemysław Gintrowski, performed by Krystyna Janda)
- Na kulawej naszej barce (music by Seweryn Krajewski, performed by Maryla Rodowicz, Katarzyna Nosowska, Katarzyna Groniec)
- Nie całuj mnie pierwsza (music by Andrzej Zieliński, performed by Skaldowie)
- Nie ma jak pompa (music by Jacek Mikuła, performed by Maryla Rodowicz)
- Nie spoczniemy[w innych językach] (music by Seweryn Krajewski, performed by Czerwone Gitary)
- Nie żałuję (music by Seweryn Krajewski, performed by Edyta Geppert)
- Niech żyje bal (music by Seweryn Krajewski, performed by Maryla Rodowicz)
- Nim wstanie dzień (music by Krzysztof Komeda, performed by Edmund Fetting, Katarzyna Groniec)
- Od nocy do nocy (music by Waldemar Kazanecki, performed by Halina Kunicka, Edyta Górniak)
- Okularnicy (music by. Jarosław Abramow, performed by Kazimiera Utrata, Zofia Kucówna, Sława Przybylska and Tadeusz Łomnicki)
- Pogoda na szczęście (music by Seweryn Krajewski, performed by Seweryn Krajewski)
- Polska Madonna (music by Andrzej Sikorowski, performed by Maryla Rodowicz)
- Sing sing (music by Jacek Mikuła, performed by Maryla Rodowicz)
- Szaloną być (music by Violetta Villas, performed by Violetta Villas)
- Sztuczny miód (music by Krzysztof Paszek, performed by Barbara Krafftówna, Katarzyna Groniec)
- Śpiewam, bo muszę (music by Andrzej Zieliński, performed by Skaldowie)
- Uciekaj moje serce (music by Seweryn Krajewski, performed by Stanisław Sojka, Katarzyna Groniec)
- Ulica japońskiej wiśni (music by Jerzy Satanowski, performed by Barbara Dziekan)
- W żółtych płomieniach liści (music by Andrzej Zieliński, performed by Łucja Prus and Skaldowie)
- Wariatka tańczy (music by Seweryn Krajewski, performed by Maryla Rodowicz, Katarzyna Groniec, Krystyna Janda)
- Wieczór na dworcu w Kansas City (music by Andrzej Zieliński, performed by Skaldowie)
- Wielka woda (music by Katarzyna Gärtner, performed by Maryla Rodowicz, Katarzyna Groniec)
- Zielono mi (music by Jan Ptaszyn Wróblewski, performed by Andrzej Dąbrowski, Andrzej Zaucha, Katarzyna Nosowska, Ania Dąbrowska)
- Zabawa w Sielance (music by Marek Lusztig, performed by Barbara Rylska, Andrzej Żarnecki)

== See also ==
- List of poets
- List of Polish poets
