= Warzyn Kmiecy =

- Village
- Location within Poland
- Coordinates: 52°47′N 19°46′E
- Country: Poland
- Voivodeship: Masovian
- County: Sierpc
- Gmina: Sierpc

Warzyn Kmiecy [ˈvaʐɨn ˈkmjɛt͡sɨ] is a village in the administrative district of Gmina Sierpc, within Sierpc County, Masovian Voivodeship, in east-central Poland.
