= Ostrów Mazowiecka massacre =

Massacre of Polish Jews by German police

- Part of the German occupation of Poland and The Holocaust
- Location: Road outside Berej Tejtel's brewery, Ostrów Mazowiecka, German-occupied Poland
- Date: November 11, 1939
- Attack type: massacre, genocide, shooting
- Deaths: Up to 600 Jews
- Injuries: None known
- Victim: Jewish residents of Ostrów Mazowiecka
- Perpetrator: German police forces acting under the orders of Friedrich-Wilhelm Krüger

The Ostrów Mazowiecka massacre happened on 11 November 1939, when hundreds of Polish Jews were shot by German policemen under the orders of Friedrich-Wilhelm Krüger.

== Preceding events ==
The Germans invaded and occupied Poland on September 1, 1939. The country was occupied and divided between Nazi Germany, the Slovak State, and the Soviet Union. On September 10, the German army took the town of Ostrów Mazowiecka, which was home to a large Jewish population, and in the German-occupied zone. On that date 15 Jews were killed in the town by the German forces. Three days later Germans invaded the town synagogue. According to a witness account "They destroyed everything in the synagogue, they tore up sheets of paper out of the holy books and then they clung them to their cars. They cut off a Rabbi’s beard and made him wash their feet. Germans made them clean a latrine with a prayer shawl. At night, they undressed women and made them do gymnastic exercises with them." The Jewish cemetery was also desecrated.

Authorities appointed a German official as the new mayor. On October 30, all the Jews were ordered to gather at the market where the Germans announced that Jews were now forbidden from managing businesses. The authorities ordered an expulsion of the Jews to the Soviet zone of Poland, and most did leave. Some 600 Jews requested they be allowed to continue residing in Ostrów Mazowiecka. The Germans did not officially respond to these requests but allowed them to stay.

An arson attack against a formerly Jewish-inhabited building at 3 Maja Street occurred on 9 November by a man wearing a gas mask and using incendiary products. The fire spread throughout the town burning dozens of houses in the Jewish Quarter to the ground. Responding firefighters were prevented by German police from putting out the fire, until the flames began spreading to the houses occupied by ethnic Germans. The policemen told the Polish residents that the fire had been started by Jews, accusing the Jewish man Berej Tejtel of being the suspect and hanging his corpse from the town hall. Almost the entire Jewish population was detained and rounded up in the town jail and the cellars of Tejtel's brewery.

== Massacre ==
The Police Major and Senior Police Commissioner were given orders by Friedrich-Wilhelm Krüger, then the SS-Oberst-Gruppenführer to kill all the Jews in Ostrów Mazowiecka. Two days after the fire had happened the detained Jews were marched to the highway, near Tejtel's brewery, by Wehrmacht soldiers and Sicherheitsdienst agents. There they saw a number of graves that had been dug by German police forces. The policemen started by shooting the men first, and then the women and children. The police force killed according to residents up to 600 Jews, although German records state that 364 Jewish civilians were killed that day. A number of photographs by German soldiers depicting the massacre exist.

Survivor Henje Kozszuchowicz recalled that "After Hitler's gangsters arrived in Ostrow Mazowiecka in 1939, their first activity was to hunt for Jews and drag them out of the houses - women with children in their hands. The Germans ordered all the Jews to the square at the brewery. After several hours, they were all driven outside of the town, on the Warszawa Highway, to the forest while threatening them with machine guns. The Germans ordered the Jews to dig a grave and then they shot all the Jews. Poles were ordered by the Germans to throw the bodies into the grave. A lot of Jews were still alive when they were tossed into the grave. The earth heaved. Among the unlucky ones was my father Moisze Berl Kozszuchowicz, who managed to run away when they took the Jews from the brewery."

== Sources ==
- "Massacre of Ostrow Mazowiecka". Ostrow-Mazowiecka.
- "MURDER ON NOVEMBER 11, 1939". www.ostrow-mazowiecka.com.
- "Testimony ("TESTIMONY")". www.ostrow-mazowiecka.com.
- "Ostrów Mazowiecka, Poland (Addendum)". www.jewishgen.org.
- "Cmentarz żydowski w Ostrowi Mazowieckiej Jewish cemetery in Ostrow Mazowiecka Judischer Friedhof Ostrow Mazowiecka". cmentarze-zydowskie.pl.
- "Henje Kozszuchowicz/Surviving The Occupation Years 1939-1944". www.holocausthistoricalsociety.org.uk.
- "Ostrów Mazowiecka - History p.5/ Holocaust Period". www.ostrow-mazowiecka.com.
- "History | Virtual Shtetl". sztetl.org.pl.
