= Grodkowo-Włóki =

Village in Gmina Sierpc, Poland

- Village
- Location within Poland
- Coordinates: 52°48′31″N 19°42′26″E
- Country: Poland
- Voivodeship: Masovian
- County: Sierpc
- Gmina: Sierpc

Grodkowo-Włóki [ɡrɔtˈkɔvɔ ˈvwuki] is a village in the administrative district of Gmina Sierpc, within Sierpc County, Masovian Voivodeship, in east-central Poland.
