= Ostrów Mazowiecka =

Town in Masovian Voivodeship, Poland

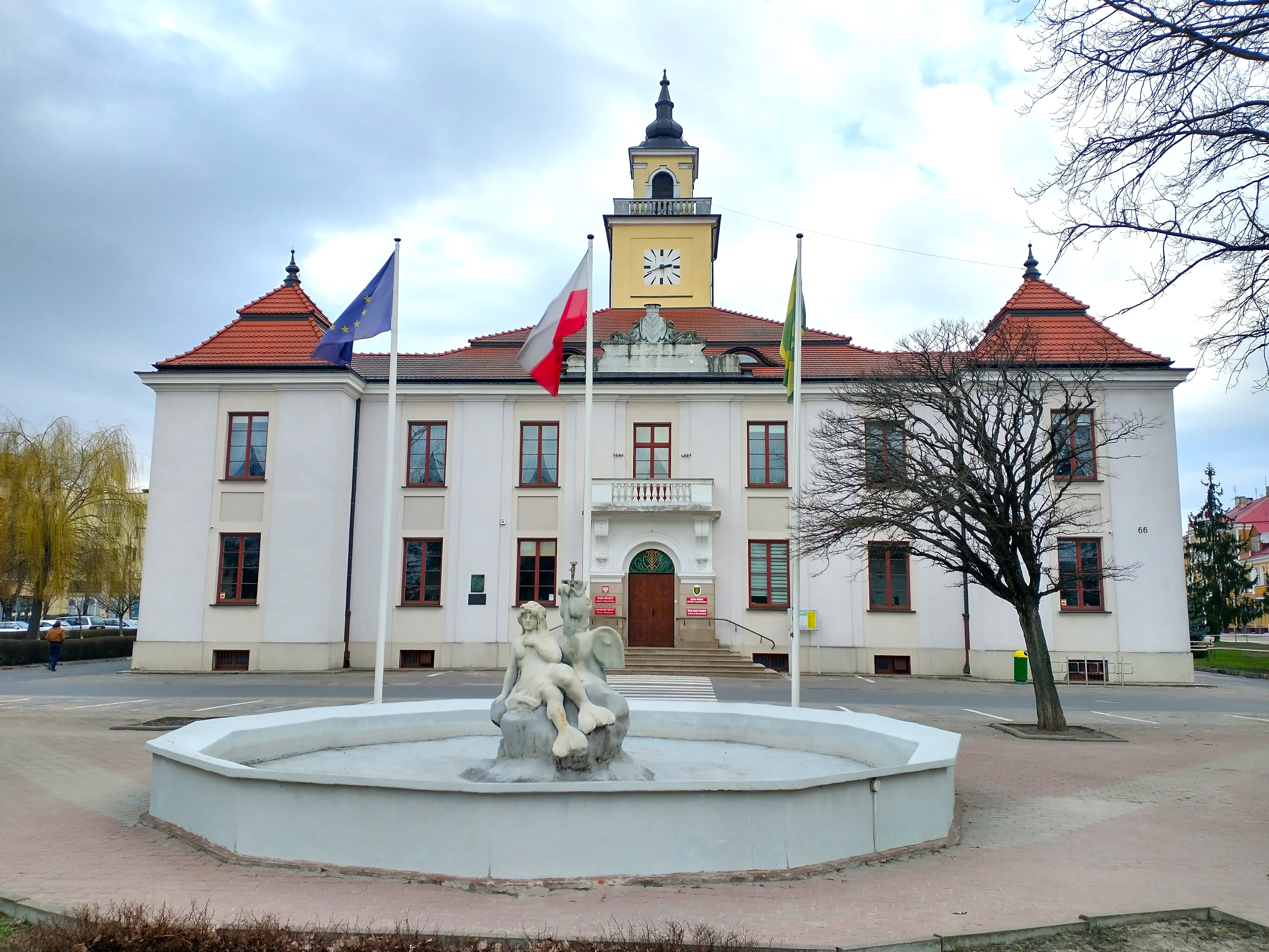
- Town hall

- Flag Coat of arms

- Location within Poland
- Coordinates: 52°48′N 21°54′E
- Country: Poland
- Voivodeship: Masovian
- County: Ostrów
- Gmina: Ostrów Mazowiecka (urban gmina)
- Established: 14th century
- Town rights: 1434

Government
  - Mayor: Hubert Betlejewski (PO)

Area
  - Total: 22.09 km^{2} (8.53 sq mi)
- Elevation: 110 m (360 ft)

Population (2013)
  - Total: 22,796
  - Density: 1,032/km^{2} (2,673/sq mi)
- Time zone: UTC+1 (CET)
  - Summer (DST): UTC+2 (CEST)
- Postal code: 07-300, 07-302
- Area code: +48 029
- Car plates: WOR
- Website: http://www.ostrowmaz.pl

Ostrów Mazowiecka ([ˈɔstruf mazɔˈvʲɛt͡ska]) (Note: Yiddish: אָסטרעווע, romanized: Ostrova) is a town in eastern Poland with 23,486 inhabitants (2004). It is the capital of Ostrów County in Masovian Voivodeship.

Founded in the Middle Ages, Ostrów Mazowiecka is a former royal town of Poland, which for centuries served as a local center of trade. The town has witnessed several battles throughout its history and was a center of fierce partisan resistance against German occupation during World War II.

The town is located at the intersection of key highways connecting Warsaw with the largest cities of northeastern Poland (Białystok, Łomża, Ełk and Suwałki) and, further on, with the Baltic states and Finland, as part of the European route E67.

== History ==
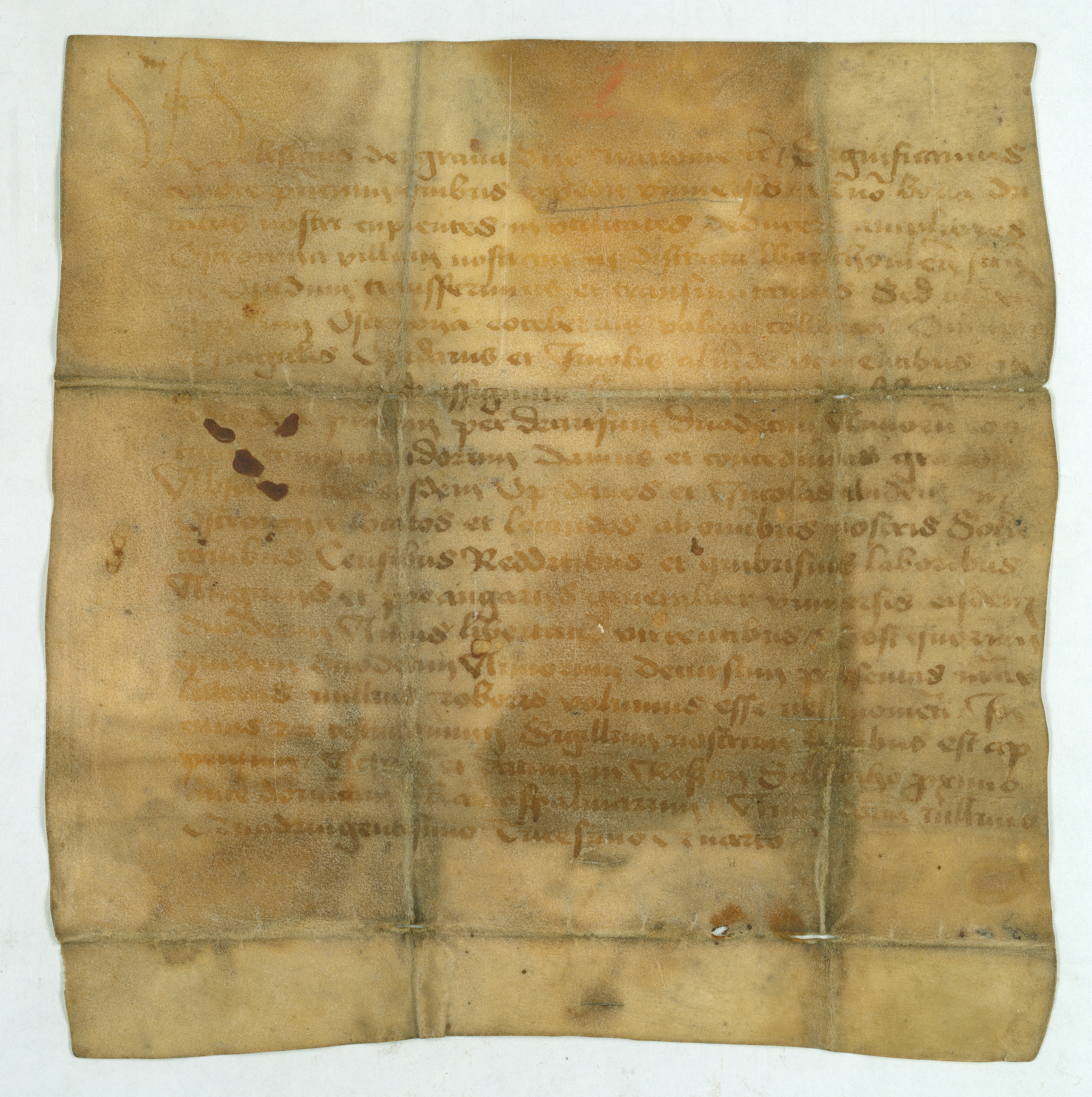
Document of granting town rights from 1434

Ostrów was granted town rights in 1434 by Duke Bolesław IV of Warsaw. Its name comes from the Old Polish word ostrowa. In 1461 a parish school was founded in the town. In 1514, Duchess Anna Radziwiłł, who is commemorated in the town with a monument, established four annual fairs and a weekly market, boosting the development of Ostrów. In the 16th century Polish King Sigismund II Augustus built a residence in Ostrów. Ostrów was a Polish royal town and county seat, administratively located in the Masovian Voivodeship in the Greater Poland Province of the Kingdom of Poland.

The town's inhabitants took part in the Kościuszko Uprising of 1794; however, the following year it was annexed by Prussia in the Third Partition of Poland. In 1807 it was included in the short-lived Polish Duchy of Warsaw, and in 1815 it became part of so-called Congress Poland within the Russian Partition of Poland. Many inhabitants took part in several battles of the Polish January Uprising of 1863–1864 against Russia, and an insurgent hospital was located in Ostrów. Ostrów was subjected to anti-Polish repressions, was one of the sites of Russian executions of Polish insurgents, and there are memorials at the execution sites. Despite such circumstances, in the following decades, various Polish organizations were founded in Ostrów. In the 19th century, the town saw a significant influx of Jewish settlers as a result of Russian discriminatory policies, and according to the 1897 census, 5,660 inhabitants out of 10,471 were Jews.

During World War I, it was occupied by Germany, and after the war, in 1918, it became part of restored independent Poland. In 1919 a reserve battalion of the Polish 15th Wolves Infantry Regiment was stationed in Ostrów Mazowiecka. It trained Polish soldiers to reinforce the 15th Wolves Infantry Regiment during the Polish–Soviet War. In 1920 a battle was fought on the town's outskirts during the Polish–Soviet War. After the war, the battalion with the entire regiment was relocated to Dęblin in 1921.

=== World War II ===
During the joint German-Soviet invasion of Poland, which started World War II, Ostrów Mazowiecka was captured by Germany on 8 September 1939, and in mid-September the Einsatzgruppe V entered the town to commit various atrocities against the population. Already on 19 September the Germans arrested nine Poles, including chairmen of local veterans' organizations Włodzimierz Gadomski and Jan Radbalski. On 9 November 1939, one of the German soldiers set fire to the buildings on 3-ego Maja Street. The German authorities accused the Jews of starting the fire. On 11 November (though according to other sources, on 10 November) 500–800 Jews were killed by the German police in the Ostrów Mazowiecka massacre.

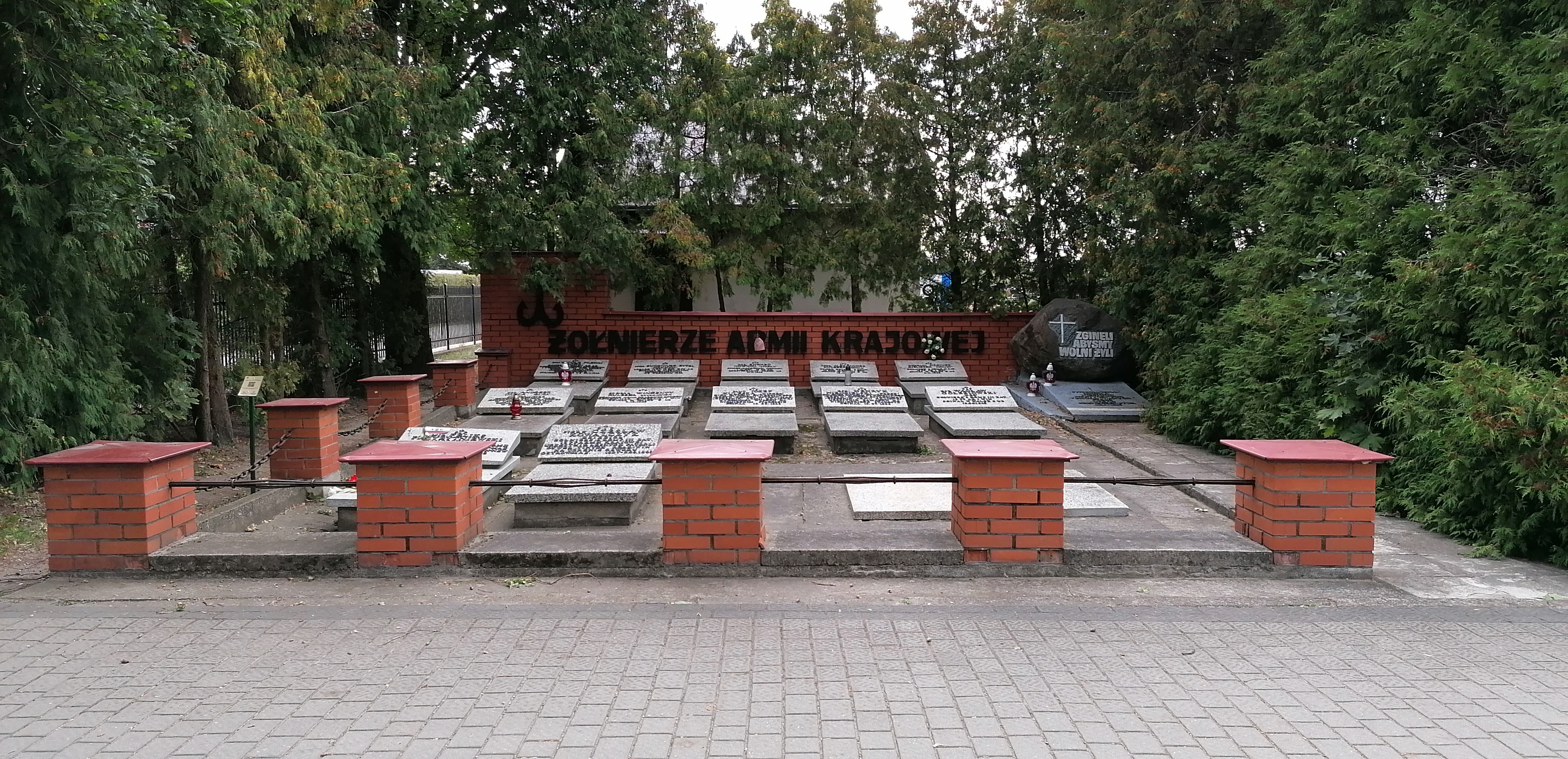
Graves of Home Army soldiers

The Polish underground resistance movement was organized already in autumn of 1939. The first resistance organizations in the area were Service for Poland's Victory, Organizacja Wojskowa, Organizacja Wojskowa „Wilki”, National Military Organization, Secret Polish Army, Polska Organizacja Zbrojna, Komenda Obrońców Polski, Polska Niepodległa. Major Eugeniusz Mieszkowski nom de guerre Ostry unified the resistance organizations into a district of the Home Army under the cryptonym "Opocznik" ("wheatear"). It covered the Ostrów County, and was divided into five centers, one of which was located in the town. In addition to typical military, sabotage, and intelligence activities, the resistance movement also organized secret Polish education and issued and distributed underground Polish press. On 1 May 1943, the Home Army blew up the headquarters of the German Arbeitsamt in retaliation for round-ups and deportations of the local population for forced labour. On 25 May 1943, the Polish resistance successfully assassinated the chief of the local German administration, in retaliation for which the Germans massacred about 140 Poles. The German occupation ended in 1944, and Ostrów was restored to Poland, although with a Soviet-installed communist regime, which stayed in power until the Fall of Communism in the 1980s. The NKVD and UB repressed members of the Polish resistance movement and began arresting and deporting them to the Soviet Union in September 1944. Many members of the Home Army soon returned to the underground and continued their resistance against the communists.

== Demographics ==
Historical population

Year	Pop.	±%
1897	10,471	—
1910	12,814	+22.4%
1921	13,425	+4.8%
1931	17,611	+31.2%

Year	Pop.	±%
1939	18,528	+5.2%
1950	11,748	−36.6%
1960	12,469	+6.1%
2010	22,536	+80.7%

== Transport ==
Ostrów Mazowiecka is located at the intersection of Polish S8 and S61 highways.

It currently has no railway station or passenger rail service. The nearest train stations are in the towns of Ostrołęka and Małkinia Górna. Although there are plans to begin the design and reconstruction of the railway line between Ostrołęka and Małkinia Górna in 2027.

== International relations ==
=== Twin towns – Sister cities ===
Ostrów Mazowiecka is twinned with:

- Brembate di Sopra, Italy
- Ryazan, Russia
- Iziaslav, Ukraine

== Notable people ==
- Asher Zebi of Ostrowo (19th century), rabbi
- Jadwiga Długoborska (1899–1944), teacher, social and charity worker
- Jan Dołęga-Zakrzewski (1866–1936), politician, surveyor, publicist, mayor of Ostrów Mazowiecka (1930–1933)
- Beata Mazurek (born 1967), politician
- Krystyna Sienkiewicz (1934–2017), actress and singer

== Gallery ==
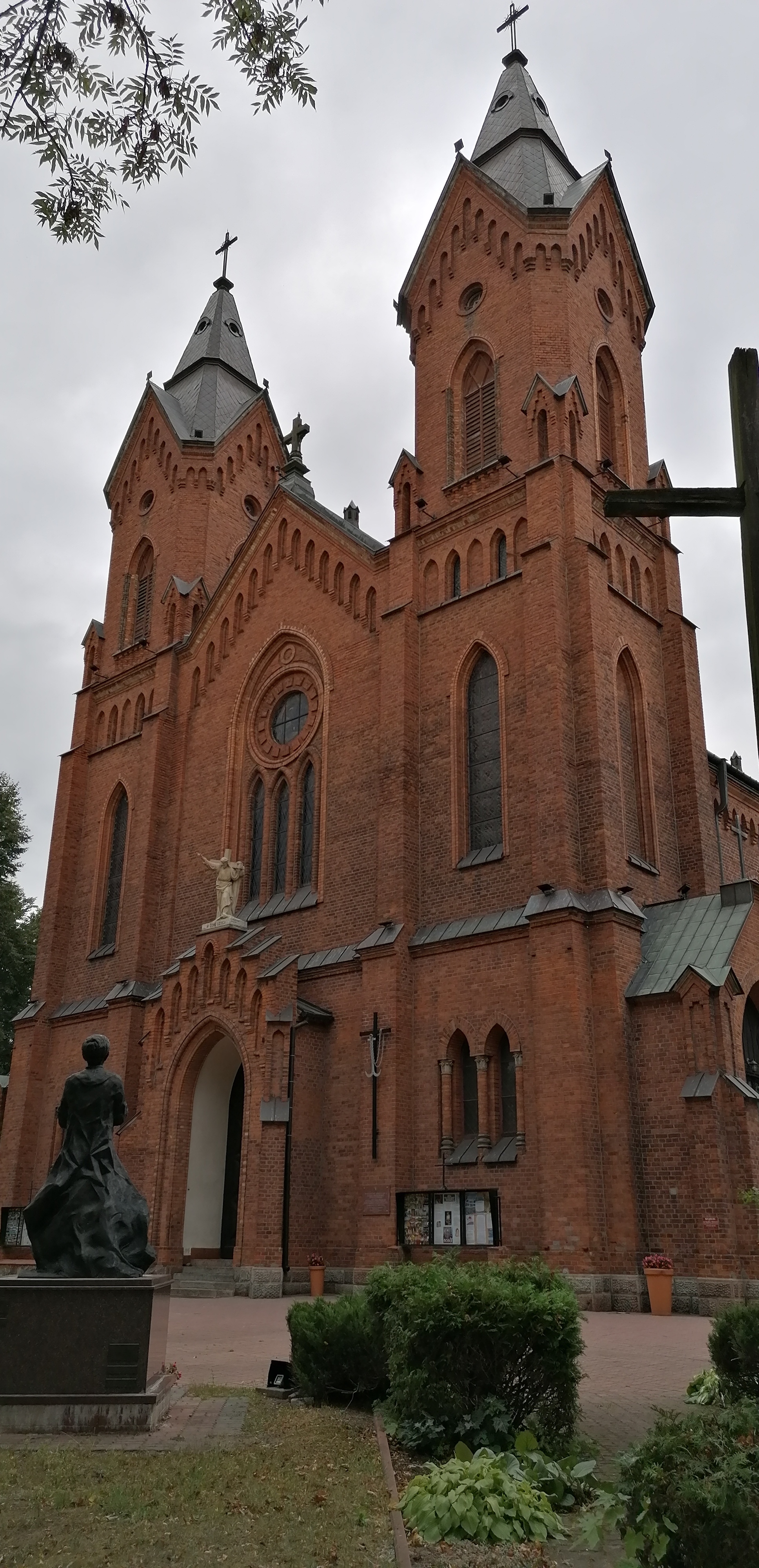
Church of the Assumption

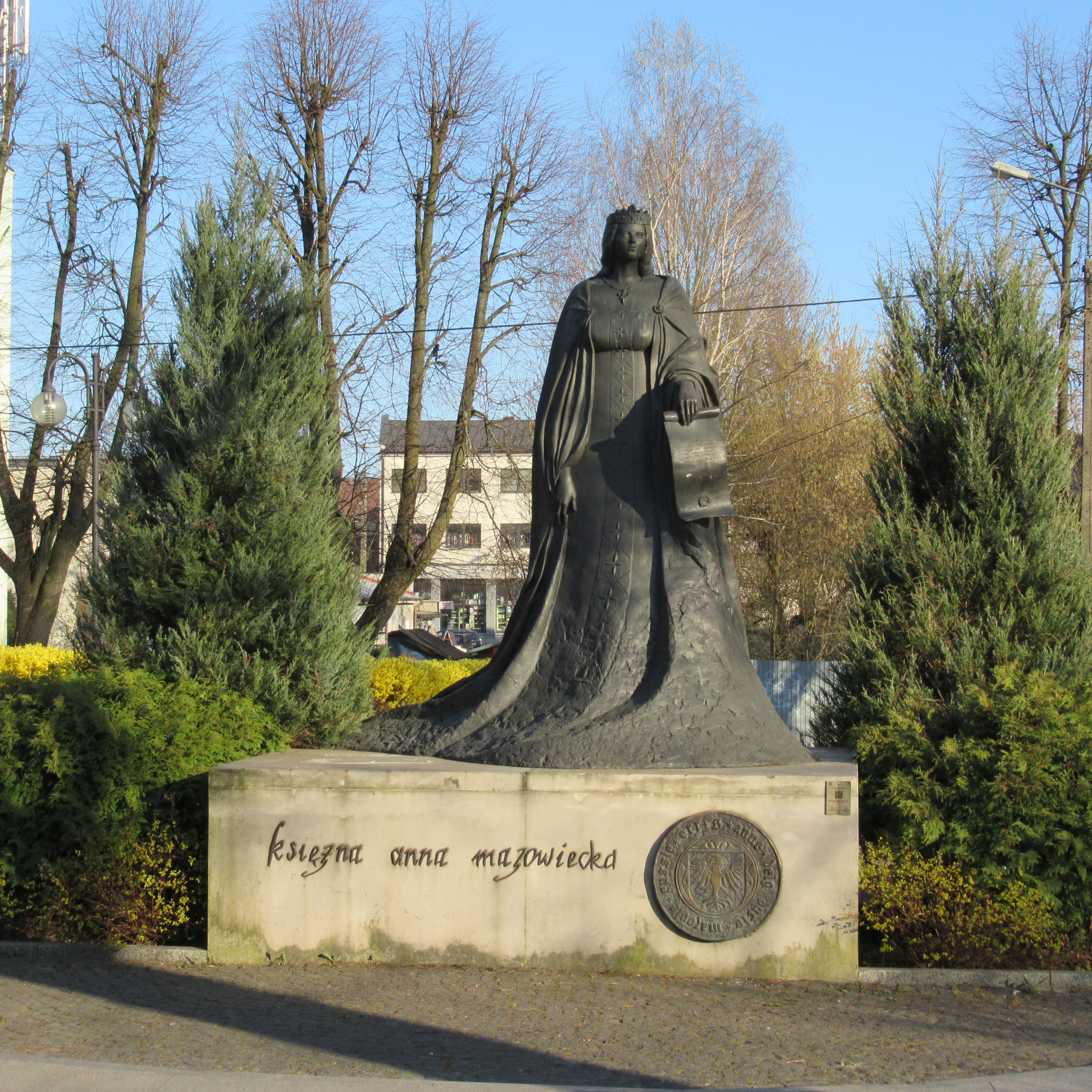
Duchess Anna Radziwiłł monument

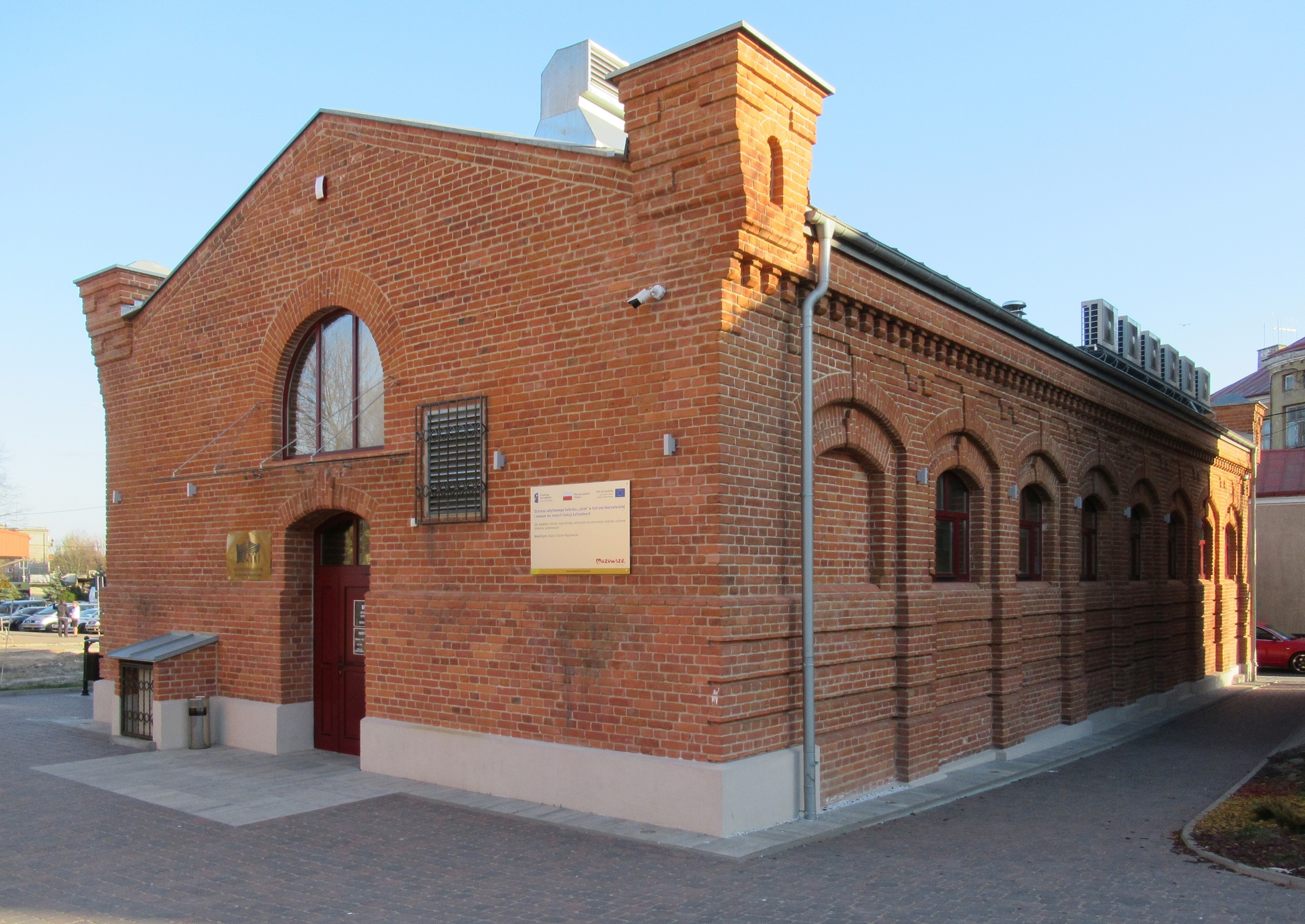
Mensa carnifiucium

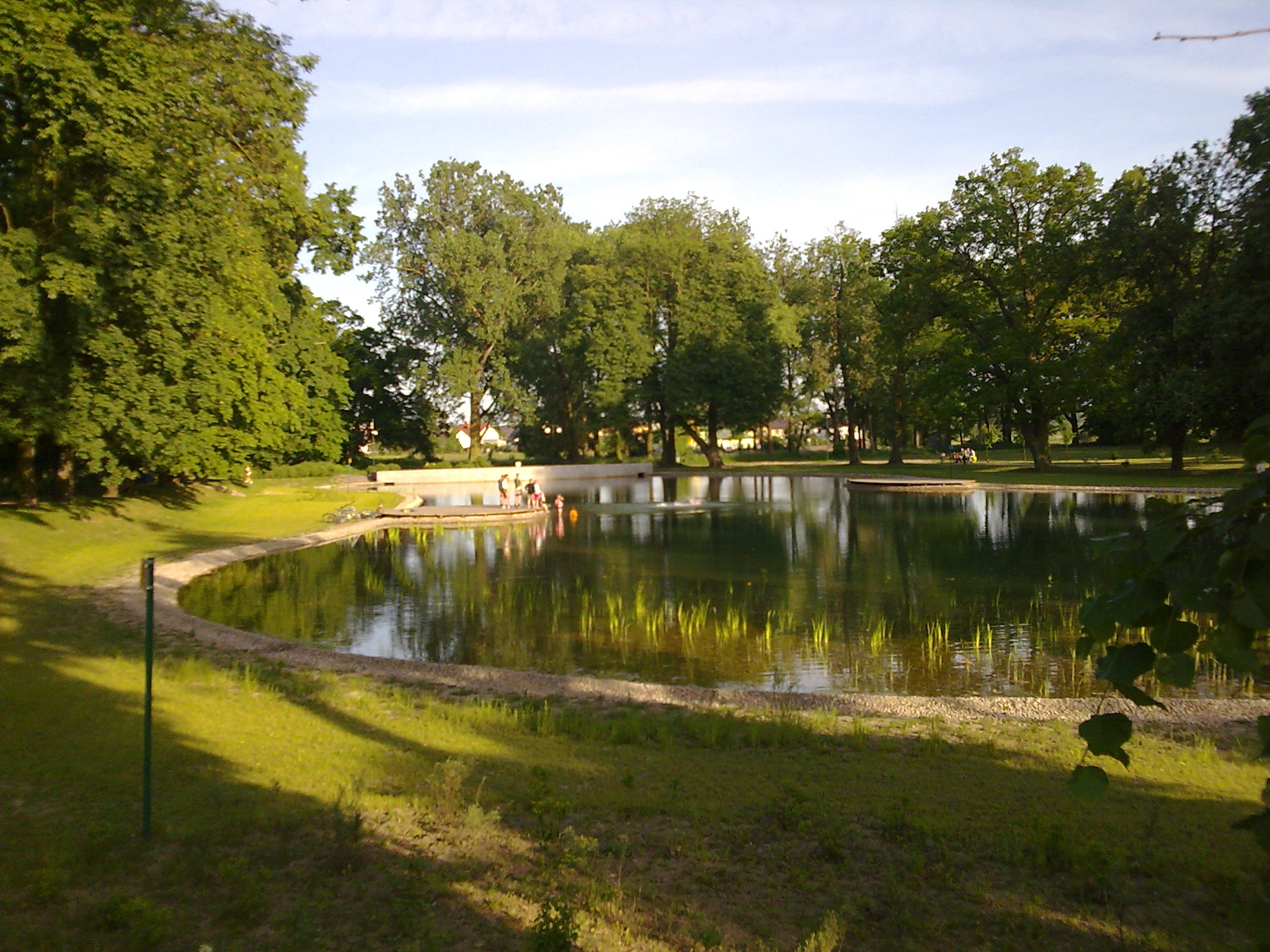
Municipal park
