= Susk =

- Village
- Location within Poland
- Coordinates: 52°48′N 19°41′E
- Country: Poland
- Voivodeship: Masovian
- County: Sierpc
- Gmina: Sierpc
- Population: 160

Susk [susk] is a village in the administrative district of Gmina Sierpc, within Sierpc County, Masovian Voivodeship, in east-central Poland.
