= Białe Błoto, Sierpc County =

Białe Błoto
- Village
- Location within Poland
- Coordinates: 52°50′N 19°44′E
- Country: Poland
- Voivodeship: Masovian
- County: Sierpc
- Gmina: Sierpc
- Population: 158
- Website: bialebloto.pev.pl

Białe Błoto [ˈbjawɛ ˈbwɔtɔ] is a village in the administrative district of Gmina Sierpc, within Sierpc County, Masovian Voivodeship, in east-central Poland.
