= Żochowo, Sierpc County =

Żochowo
- Village
- Location within Poland
- Coordinates: 52°50′31″N 19°34′47″E
- Country: Poland
- Voivodeship: Masovian
- County: Sierpc
- Gmina: Sierpc

Żochowo [ʐɔˈxɔvɔ] is a village in the administrative district of Gmina Sierpc, within Sierpc County, Masovian Voivodeship, in east-central Poland.
