= Szczepanki, Sierpc County =

Szczepanki
- Village
- Location within Poland
- Coordinates: 52°46′N 19°45′E
- Country: Poland
- Voivodeship: Masovian
- County: Sierpc
- Gmina: Sierpc

Szczepanki [ʂt͡ʂɛˈpaŋki] is a village in the administrative district of Gmina Sierpc, within Sierpc County, Masovian Voivodeship, in east-central Poland.
