= Podwierzbie, Sierpc County =

Podwierzbie
- Village
- Location within Poland
- Coordinates: 52°51′N 19°35′E
- Country: Poland
- Voivodeship: Masovian
- County: Sierpc
- Gmina: Sierpc

Podwierzbie [pɔdˈvjɛʐbjɛ] is a village in the administrative district of Gmina Sierpc, within Sierpc County, Masovian Voivodeship, in east-central Poland.
