= Gorzewo, Sierpc County =

Gorzewo
- Village
- Location within Poland
- Coordinates: 52°49′00″N 19°40′50″E
- Country: Poland
- Voivodeship: Masovian
- County: Sierpc
- Gmina: Sierpc
- Population: 303
- Website: www.gorzewo_paintball.republika.pl

Gorzewo [ɡɔˈʐɛvɔ] is a village in the administrative district of Gmina Sierpc, within Sierpc County, Masovian Voivodeship, in east-central Poland.
