= Jan Dołęga-Zakrzewski =

Polish political and social activist

Jan Dołęga-Zakrzewski (pronunciation: Dolenga Zakshevski; 7 November 1866 – 3 December 1936) was a Polish surveyor, political and social activist, publicist. He was a member of the Association of the Polish Youth "Zet" and of the National League as well as mayor of Ostrów Mazowiecka (1930–1933).

== Family ==
Jan Dołęga-Zakrzewski was born on 7 November 1866 in the locality Białyszewo, Sierpc county, in the landed estate belonging to his parents Szczepan (Stephen) and Józefa née Smoleńska. He came from a very old noble family. The house of Dołęga-Zakrzewski is a line of the medieval Dołęga (Dolenga) clan, who descended from a knight, who came from the Netherlands to Poland in XII century – Hugo van Arkel called Butyr (about 1096-before 1166), komes (count), the castellan of Chełmno and the commander of the army of the Duke of Mazovia and the supreme prince of Poland – Bolesław IV the Curly. His family ruled over numerous landed estates in northern Mazovia. Grandfather – Jan (1803–1869) – was the heir of Sokołowo, Kosmaczewo and Petrykozy, (over 750 ha), father – Szczepan (1825–1892) – Białyszewo, Szczepanki, Ważyno Kmiece, Piaski Białyszewskie and Mlice Kostery (about 960 ha). Grandfather resided in the manor house in Kosmaczewo, father in the manor in Białyszewo. Szczepan Dołęga-Zakrzewski took part in the January Uprising 1863. Mother conducted social and educational activities in the Sierpc county.

== Education ==
He received his first education from tutors employed at the Białyszewo court. Then he started education at the Classic Gymnasium in Płock, which he graduated in 1884. As a student of this school, and also a member of the secret Youth Circle of History and Native Literature Lovers, he organized self-education circles in the Białyszewo commune. In 1885 he began studies at the Agricultural Surveying Institute in Pskov (Russia). He graduated in 1889 receiving a diploma of surveyor. At the end of his studies, he joined the Association of the Polish Youth "Zet", an organization that prepares activists for the National League.

== Social and political activity ==
After returning to Poland, he first worked as a surveyor in Ciechanów, and in April 1892 he took the position of a district surveyor in Ostrów Mazowiecka. At the same time, as a sworn surveyor, he opened his own surveying office. From the moment of his arrival in Ostrów, he was an active social activist. He belonged, among others, to the circle of the Polish School Society, the Volunteer Fire Brigade, the Charity Society and the Theater Circle. Jan Dołęga-Zakrzewski was a specialist in the amalgamation of the Polish countryside. He wrote several articles and books about it, among them the book "On amalgamation of rural land, or abolition of chessboard patterns" (Warsaw 1913). His articles were published, among others, by in "Gazeta Ostrowska" and in Warsaw magazines: "Gazeta Rolnicza", "Ognisko" and "Gazeta Warszawska". He played an important role in the development of the peasant movement for land amalgamation, which was born in Mazovia.

In addition to public activity, he also conducted secret national work. Around 1905 he joined the National League. For a long time he was a permanent deputy of Dr. Jan Harusewicz, the League's commissioner for the Łomża region. He took part in the Revolution in the Kingdom of Poland (1905–07). In mid 1913, he started working as the chief appraiser-instructor for amalgamation of the Polish countryside at the Central Agricultural Society in Warsaw. The area of his activity then became the entire Kingdom of Poland. After the outbreak of World War I, he became an activist of the Central Citizen's Committee. Evacuated with his family to Russia, he was tasked with establishing a committee in Rahachow, Mogilev Province. As the Branch Manager (he was popularly known as the president), he made a great contribution in organizing help and care for thousands of families of Polish refugees. In this arena he collaborated with Władysław Grabski, Jan Harusewicz, Stanisław Wojciechowski, Jan Załuska and Prince Seweryn Franciszek Światopełk-Czetwertyński.

He returned to Ostrów Mazowiecka with his family in June 1918. In October 1918 he was appointed a sub-commissioner, and in December a land commissar for the Ostrów county. He took an active part in disarming German soldiers stationed in the town (11 November 1918). The military action was led by the captain (later general and historian) Marian Kukiel, and the civilian population by Jan Dołęga-Zakrzewski and Dr. Wacław Szaykowski. In the years 1920–1921, he participated in the plebiscite activity for Poland to obtain the territory of Upper Silesia. During the presidency of Stanisław Wojciechowski, he rejected the proposal to become the minister of agriculture. His health deteriorated significantly.

In 1930 he became the last elected mayor of Ostrów Mazowiecka. He held this office until 1933. His term in office fell on a catastrophic period in the urban economy. The town was heavily indebted. Jan Dołęga-Zakrzewski tried to save Ostrów by not collecting the salary due to him for official activities. He gave the town nearly 20,000 zlotys. He also conducted research on the past of Ostrów Mazowiecka, the name and coat of arms of the town. He collected a lot of materials that he was unable to publish before his death. Those that survived World War II were included in the book: Jan Zakrzewski "Collected material for the monograph of the town of Ostrów Mazowiecka" (Municipal Office of Ostrów Mazowiecka, Warszawa-Ostrów Mazowiecka 2004; the collection was prepared by son Adam Wiesław Dołęga-Zakrzewski; prepared for printing and wrote a preface great-grandson Dr. Leszek Dołęga-Zakrzewski).

He died on 3 December 1936.

Jan Dołęga-Zakrzewski entered into a marriage with Janina Henryka Humięcka, daughter of Jakub, the owner of the Bielino estate, and Maria née Bojanowska. They had three sons, Marek, Adam and Leszek. Janina Henryka Zakrzewska née Humięcka was the cousin of prof. Ignacy Mościcki, President of the Republic of Poland.

Zakrzewski wrote the following:

- O scalaniu gruntów czyli znoszeniu szachownic (Warsaw, 1913)
- Zbiór materiałów do monografii miasta Ostrowi Mazowieckiej (Urząd Miasta Ostrów Mazowiecka, Warszawa-Ostrów Mazowiecka, 2004; collection of works published posthumously)
- Jan Harusewicz. Lekarz i polityk (Warsaw, 1935, co-author)

He wrote numerous articles which were published in newspapers and journals such as Gazeta Ostrowska, Gazeta Rolnicza, Ognisko, and Gazeta Warszawska.

== Legacy ==
In Ostrów Mazowiecka there is a street named after him.

== Sources ==
- M. Bartniczak, Jan Dołęga-Zakrzewski. 7. XI. 1866 – 3. XII. 1936, [in:] Zapiski Ciechanowskie, t. III (1977), pp. 104–113;
- A. Cz. Dobroński, Dzieje Ostrowi Mazowieckiej do 1914 roku, Ostrów Mazowiecka 2007;
- Aleksander Gieysztor, Trzy stulecia najdawniejszego Mazowsza (połowa X-połowa XIII w.), (in:) Dzieje Mazowsza do 1526 roku, Warszawa 1994;
- Warszawski Dziennik Narodowy, czwartek, 10 grudnia 1936 r. – Nr 339-B-Rok II, p. 5;
- A. Kołodziejczyk, Odzyskanie niepodległości w 1918 roku – przebieg wydarzeń na Mazowszu, [in:] Warszawa i Mazowsze w walce o niepodległość kraju w latach 1794–1920, LSW, Warszawa 2001;
- S. Kozicki, Historia Ligi Narodowej (okres 1887–1907), Myśl Polska, Londyn 1964;
- Z. Lasocki, Dołęga czy do Łęga? O powstaniu nazwy rodu i herbu Dołęga i rozsiedleniu Dołęgów w okolicach Łęga, oraz legenda o rycerzu Dołędze, Cieszyn 1932;
- E. Lewandowski, Ciechanowski słownik biograficzny, Ciechanów 2008, pp. 82–83;
- Ostrów Mazowiecka. Z dziejów miasta i powiatu, ed. S. Russocki, KiW, Warszawa 1975;
- J. Powierski, Hugo Butyr. Fragment stosunków polsko-niderlandzkich w XII wieku, (in:) Zapiski Historyczne, t. 37, Toruń 1972, zeszyt 2, pp. 9–41;
- E. Zielińska, Wpisani w historię. Słownik biograficzny województwa ostrołęckiego, TPO, Ostrołęka 1990;
- Zorza, czwartek, 18 lutego 1937 r. – Nr 14, p. 8;
- Leszek S. Zakrzewski, House of Dołęga-Zakrzewski. A brief compendium, Warsaw 2014;
- Jan Dołęga-Zakrzewski (1866–1936), Polskie Radio RDC, radio broadcast from the series "Clans and Families of Mazovia" (Rody i rodziny Mazowsza), in which host Piotr Szymon Łoś speaks with Prof. Leszek Stanisław Zakrzewski — Jan’s great-grandson, a sociologist and historian; in Polish https://www.rdc.pl/public/podcast/rody-i-rodziny-mazowsza_ggLWmcihBmWFwcvhfAos?episode=Ia8JlDjULf4kjX72pi6L [accessed: 02.10.2026]
