= Osówka, Sierpc County =

Osówka
- Village
- Location within Poland
- Coordinates: 52°53′N 19°34′E
- Country: Poland
- Voivodeship: Masovian
- County: Sierpc
- Gmina: Sierpc

Osówka [ɔˈsufka] is a village in the administrative district of Gmina Sierpc, within Sierpc County, Masovian Voivodeship, in east-central Poland.
