= Kręćkowo =

- Village
- Location within Poland
- Coordinates: 52°47′35″N 19°38′11″E
- Country: Poland
- Voivodeship: Masovian
- County: Sierpc
- Gmina: Sierpc

Kręćkowo [krɛnt͡ɕˈkɔvɔ] is a village in the administrative district of Gmina Sierpc, within Sierpc County, Masovian Voivodeship, in East-Central Poland.
