= Gmina Sierpc =

Gmina Sierpc Sierpc Commune
- Gmina
- Coat of arms
- Interactive map of Gmina Sierpc
- Coordinates (Sierpc): 52°53′N 19°40′E
- Country: Poland
- Voivodeship: Masovian
- County: Sierpc
- Seat: Sierpc

Area
  - Total: 150.23 km^{2} (58.00 sq mi)

Population (2006)
  - Total: 7,141
  - Density: 47.53/km^{2} (123.1/sq mi)
- Time zone: UTC+1 (CET)
  - Summer (DST): UTC+2 (CEST)
- Vehicle registration: WSE
- Website: http://www.gmina.sierpc.pl

Gmina Sierpc is a rural gmina (administrative district) in Sierpc County, Masovian Voivodeship, in north-central Poland. Its seat is the town of Sierpc, although the town is not part of the territory of the gmina.

The gmina covers an area of 150.23 square kilometres (58.0 sq mi), and as of 2006 its total population is 7,141.

== Villages ==
Gmina Sierpc contains the villages and settlements of Białe Błoto, Białoskóry, Białyszewo, Białyszewo-Towarzystwo, Bledzewko, Bledzewo, Borkowo Kościelne, Borkowo Wielkie, Dąbrówki, Dębowo, Dziembakowo, Goleszyn, Gorzewo, Grodkowo-Włóki, Grodkowo-Zawisze, Karolewo, Kisielewo, Kręćkowo, Kwaśno, Mieszaki, Mieszczk, Miłobędzyn, Nowe Piastowo, Nowy Susk, Osówka, Pawłowo, Piaski, Podwierzbie, Rachocin, Rydzewo, Stare Piastowo, Studzieniec, Sudragi, Sułocin-Teodory, Sułocin-Towarzystwo, Susk, Szczepanki, Warzyn Kmiecy, Warzyn-Skóry, Wernerowo, Wilczogóra and Żochowo.

== Neighbouring gminas ==
Gmina Sierpc is bordered by the town of Sierpc and by the gminas of Gozdowo, Mochowo, Rościszewo, Skępe, Szczutowo and Zawidz.
