= Nowy Susk, Sierpc County =

Nowy Susk
- Village
- Location within Poland
- Coordinates: 52°47′32″N 19°40′24″E
- Country: Poland
- Voivodeship: Masovian
- County: Sierpc
- Gmina: Sierpc
- Population: 50

Nowy Susk [ˈnɔvɨ ˈsusk] is a village in the administrative district of Gmina Sierpc, within Sierpc County, Masovian Voivodeship, in east-central Poland.
