= Kwaśno =

- Village
- Location within Poland
- Coordinates: 52°51′07″N 19°36′47″E
- Country: Poland
- Voivodeship: Masovian
- County: Sierpc
- Gmina: Sierpc

Kwaśno [ˈkfaɕnɔ] is a village in the administrative district of Gmina Sierpc within Sierpc County, Masovian Voivodeship, in east-central Poland.
