= DJ Hazel =

Polish DJ and music producer (1980–2025)

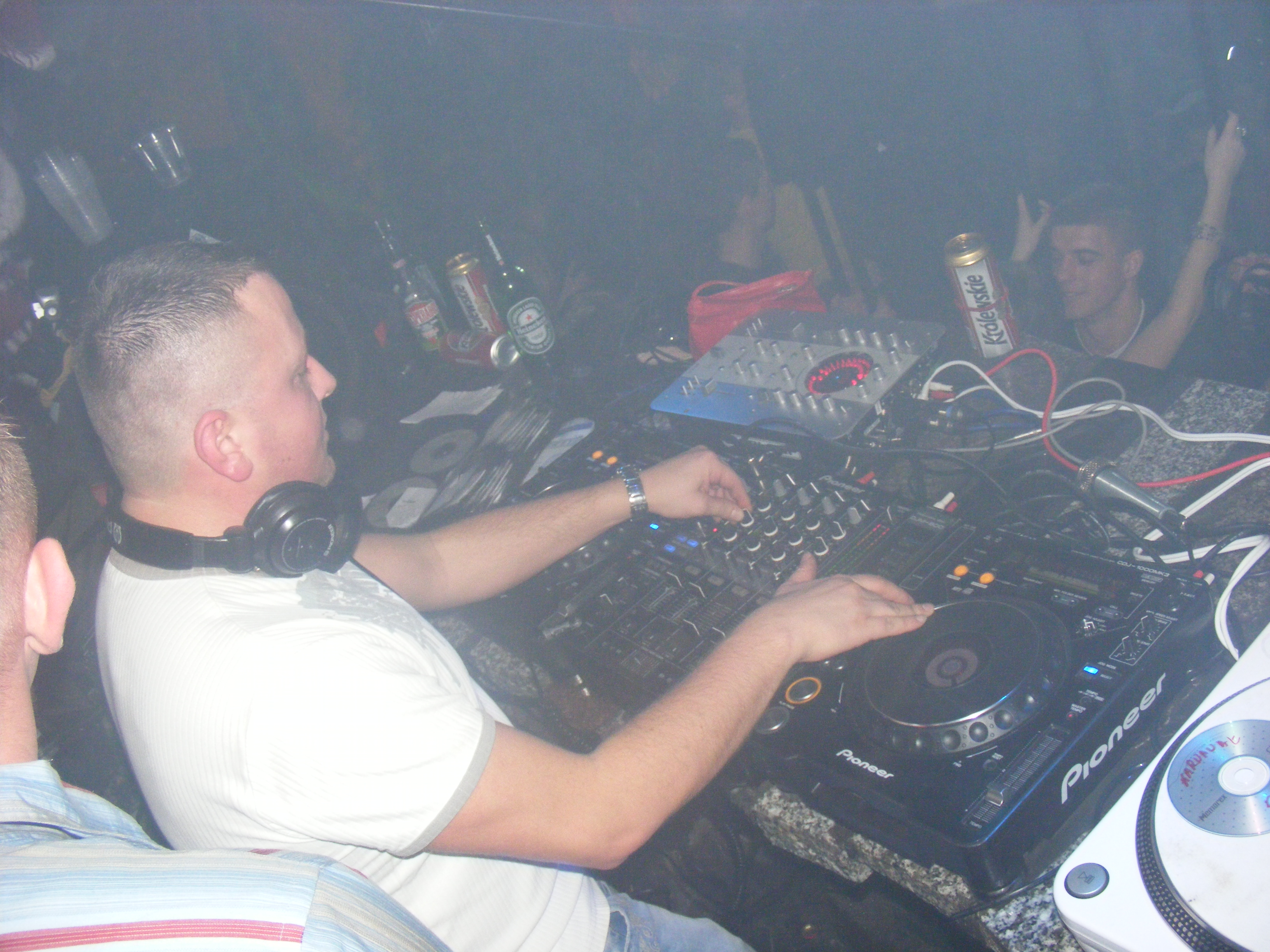
- DJ Hazel in 2009
- Born: Michał Orzechowski; 1 July 1980; Warsaw, Poland
- Died: 7 May 2025 (aged 44); Skępe, Poland
- Occupation(s): DJ; Music producer

Michał Orzechowski (1 July 1980 – 7 May 2025), better known by his stage name DJ Hazel, was a Polish DJ and music producer.

== Life and career ==
Born in Warsaw on 1 July 1980, Orzechowski began DJing in 1998. In 2001, he took part in the European DJ Championship, taking second place out of 80 participants. From 2004 to 2005, he was the resident DJ of the club Ecuador Manieczki before moving to Omen Club Płośnica in 2006. His primary styles included house, electro house, progressive house, trance, hard trance, hardstyle, and techno. He also was prominent in the vixa scene.

In 2005, he founded the company Bud-Net, under which he founded a hostel in Skępe in 2008. He was also a partner of Ego Partner s.c. and Media Partner s.c., which owned clubs in Warsaw and Borkowo Kościelne. In December 2011, he released the title "I Love Poland". In June 2012, he released his second title, "Give me the Stars". He won the Dance Music Awards 2013 in the Polish DJ club category. In March 2014, "I Love Poland" was played at a ski jump competition in Oslo. In 2015, he signed with Ultra Records, which committed to promoting and producing his music videos. That year, his singles "Bitch!" and "Let's Do this" peaked at 35 and 50, respectively on the POL Dance chart.

== Death ==
DJ Hazel was found dead in his car near Skępe, on 7 May 2025, at the age of 44.
