= Wilczogóra, Sierpc County =

Wilczogóra
- Village
- Location within Poland
- Coordinates: 52°51′19″N 19°46′08″E
- Country: Poland
- Voivodeship: Masovian
- County: Sierpc
- Gmina: Sierpc

Wilczogóra [vilt͡ʂɔˈɡura] is a village in the administrative district of Gmina Sierpc, within Sierpc County, Masovian Voivodeship, in east-central Poland.
