= Warzyn-Skóry =

- Village
- Location within Poland
- Coordinates: 52°47′51″N 19°44′51″E
- Country: Poland
- Voivodeship: Masovian
- County: Sierpc
- Gmina: Sierpc

Warzyn-Skóry [ˈvaʐɨn ˈskurɨ] is a village in the administrative district of Gmina Sierpc, within Sierpc County, Masovian Voivodeship, in east-central Poland.
