= Nowe Piastowo =

- Village
- Location within Poland
- Coordinates: 52°48′03″N 19°38′30″E
- Country: Poland
- Voivodeship: Masovian
- County: Sierpc
- Gmina: Sierpc

Nowe Piastowo [ˈnɔvɛ pjasˈtɔvɔ] is a village in the administrative district of Gmina Sierpc, within Sierpc County, Masovian Voivodeship, in east-central Poland.
