= Goleszyn =

- Village
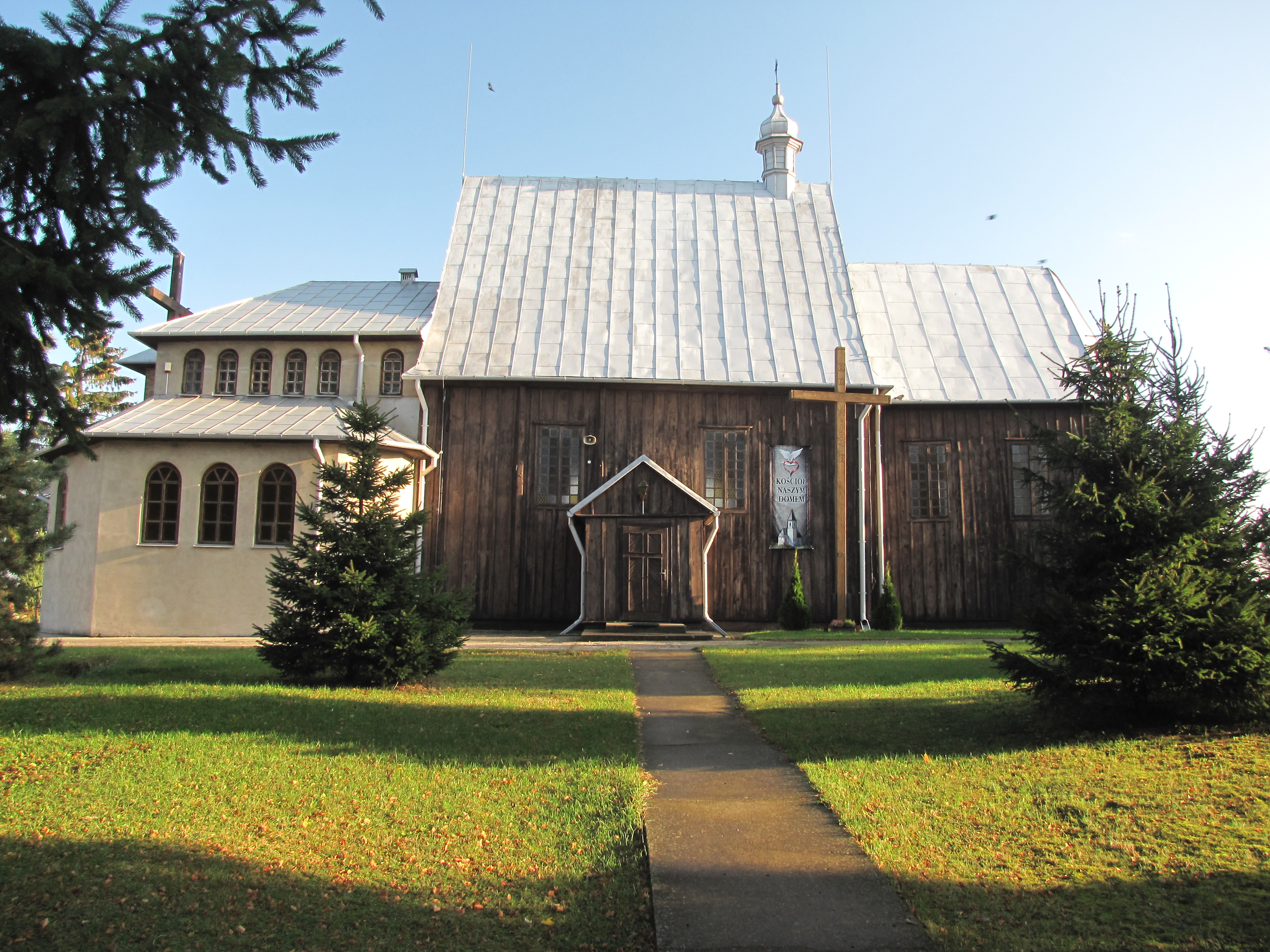
- Saint Matthew church in Goleszyn

- Location within Poland
- Coordinates: 52°47′N 19°44′E
- Country: Poland
- Voivodeship: Masovian
- County: Sierpc
- Gmina: Sierpc
- Time zone: UTC+1 (CET)
  - Summer (DST): UTC+2 (CEST)
- Vehicle registration: WSE

Goleszyn [ɡɔˈlɛʂɨn] is a village in the administrative district of Gmina Sierpc, within Sierpc County, Masovian Voivodeship, in central Poland.

Five Polish citizens were murdered by Nazi Germany in the village during World War II.
