= Sułocin-Towarzystwo =

- Village
- Location within Poland
- Coordinates: 52°51′57″N 19°35′55″E
- Country: Poland
- Voivodeship: Masovian
- County: Sierpc
- Gmina: Sierpc

Sułocin-Towarzystwo [suˈwɔt͡ɕin tɔvaˈʐɨstfɔ] is a village in the administrative district of Gmina Sierpc, within Sierpc County, Masovian Voivodeship, in east-central Poland.
