= Rydzewo, Sierpc County =

Rydzewo
- Village
- Location within Poland
- Coordinates: 52°52′52″N 19°38′2″E
- Country: Poland
- Voivodeship: Masovian
- County: Sierpc
- Gmina: Sierpc

Rydzewo [rɨˈd͡zɛvɔ] is a village in the administrative district of Gmina Sierpc, within Sierpc County, Masovian Voivodeship, in east-central Poland.
