= Krystyna Sienkiewicz =

Polish actress and singer (1935–2017)

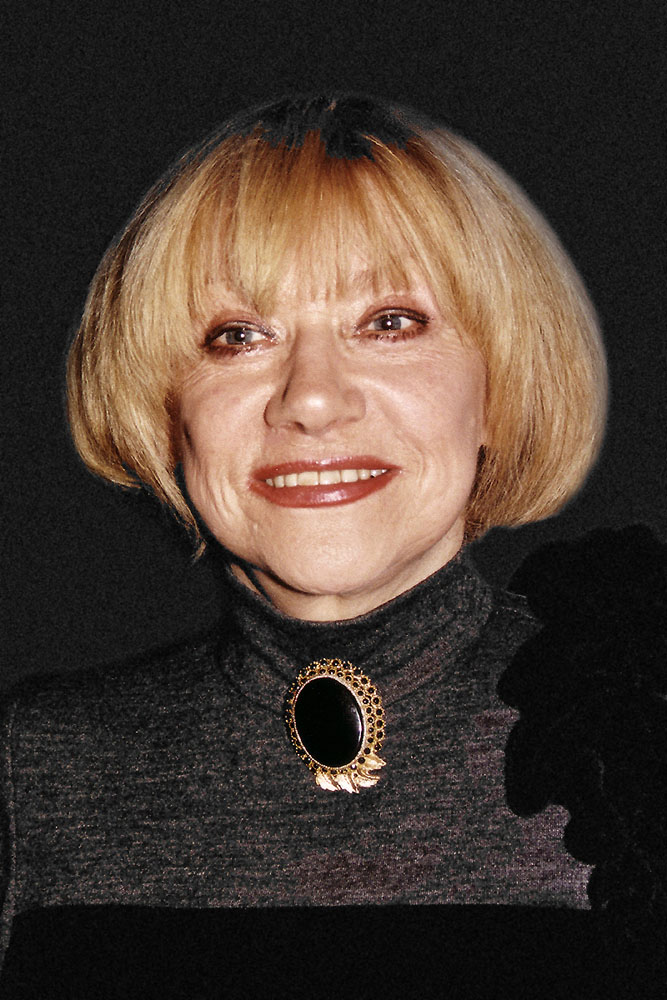
- Krystyna Sienkiewicz in 2004
- Born: Krystyna Waleria Sienkiewicz; 14 February 1935; Ostrów Mazowiecka, Poland
- Died: 12 February 2017 (aged 81); Warsaw, Poland
- Occupations: actress, singer
- Years active: 1955–2017
- Musical career
- Genres: sung poetry
- Instrument: vocals
- Label: EMI Music Poland

Krystyna Waleria Sienkiewicz (14 February 1935 – 12 February 2017) was a Polish actress and singer.

== Biography ==
While Sienkiewicz's family originally came from Grodno, she was born on 14 February 1935 in Ostrów Mazowiecka. Her parents died during World War II (her father was murdered in Oranienburg concentration camp, her mother died after an illness). In 1945, she was adopted by her aunt and moved to Szczytno.

In 1957 she graduated from the Academy of Fine Arts in Warsaw. Sienkiewicz debuted as an actress two years earlier, on 1 September 1955 at the Studencki Teatr Satyryków (STS; Student's Theatre of Satirists). A famous Polish movie critic, Krzysztof Teodor Toeplitz described her as a pink phenomenon of STS (różowe zjawisko STS-u).

In 1958, Sienkiewicz performed in her first movie, Farewells by Wojciech Has. From that moment she appeared in more than 20 movies, including Jutro premiera (1962), Lekarstwo na miłość (1967) and Rzeczpospolita Babska (1969).

During her theatrical career she was an actress of: Ateneum Theatre, TR Warszawa, Polish Theatre in Poznań, Theatre of Wola, Rampa Theatre, Finestra Theatre and Warsaw's Comedy Theatre.

As a singer, Sienkiewicz mainly sang poems by Agnieszka Osiecka, Konstanty Ildefons Gałczyński and Olga Lipińska. In 2007 she was awarded the Medal for Merit to Culture – Gloria Artis.

Krystyna Sienkiewicz died in 2017 in Warsaw, two days before her 82nd birthday. She was buried at Powązki Military Cemetery. As Sienkiewicz was not religious, her funeral was secular. She is survived by her adopted daughter Julia and nephew Kuba Sienkiewicz.
