= Karolewo, Sierpc County =

Karolewo
- Village
- Location within Poland
- Coordinates: 52°52′24″N 19°35′33″E
- Country: Poland
- Voivodeship: Masovian
- County: Sierpc
- Gmina: Sierpc

Karolewo [karɔˈlɛvɔ] is a village in the administrative district of Gmina Sierpc, within Sierpc County, Masovian Voivodeship, in east-central Poland.
