= Sułocin-Teodory =

- Village
- Location within Poland
- Coordinates: 52°51′18″N 19°35′06″E
- Country: Poland
- Voivodeship: Masovian
- County: Sierpc
- Gmina: Sierpc

Sułocin-Teodory [suˈwɔt͡ɕin tɛɔˈdɔrɨ] is a village in the administrative district of Gmina Sierpc, within Sierpc County, Masovian Voivodeship, in east-central Poland.
