= Białyszewo-Towarzystwo =

Village in Gmina Sierpc, Poland

- Village
- Location within Poland
- Coordinates: 52°46′40″N 19°44′00″E
- Country: Poland
- Voivodeship: Masovian
- County: Sierpc
- Gmina: Sierpc

Białyszewo-Towarzystwo [bjawɨˈʂɛvɔ tɔvaˈʐɨstfɔ] is a village in the administrative district of Gmina Sierpc, within Sierpc County, Masovian Voivodeship, in east-central Poland.
