= Borkowo Kościelne =

- Village
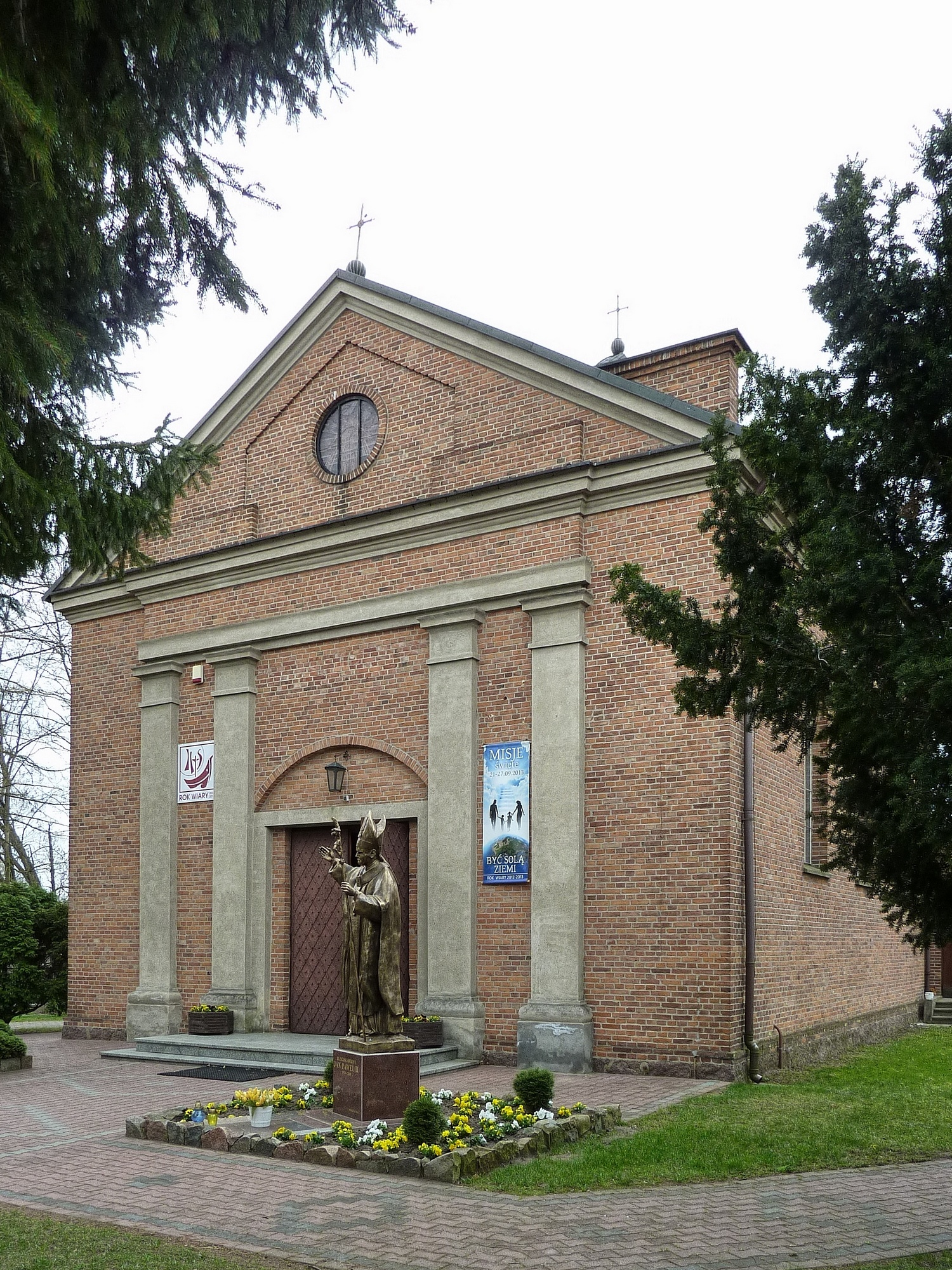
- Church of Saint Apollonia

- Location within Poland
- Coordinates: 52°50′N 19°43′E
- Country: Poland
- Voivodeship: Masovian
- County: Sierpc
- Gmina: Sierpc

Borkowo Kościelne [bɔrˈkɔvɔ kɔɕˈt͡ɕɛlnɛ] is a village in the administrative district of Gmina Sierpc, within Sierpc County, Masovian Voivodeship, in east-central Poland.
