= Agata Passent =

Polish journalist and writer (born 1973)

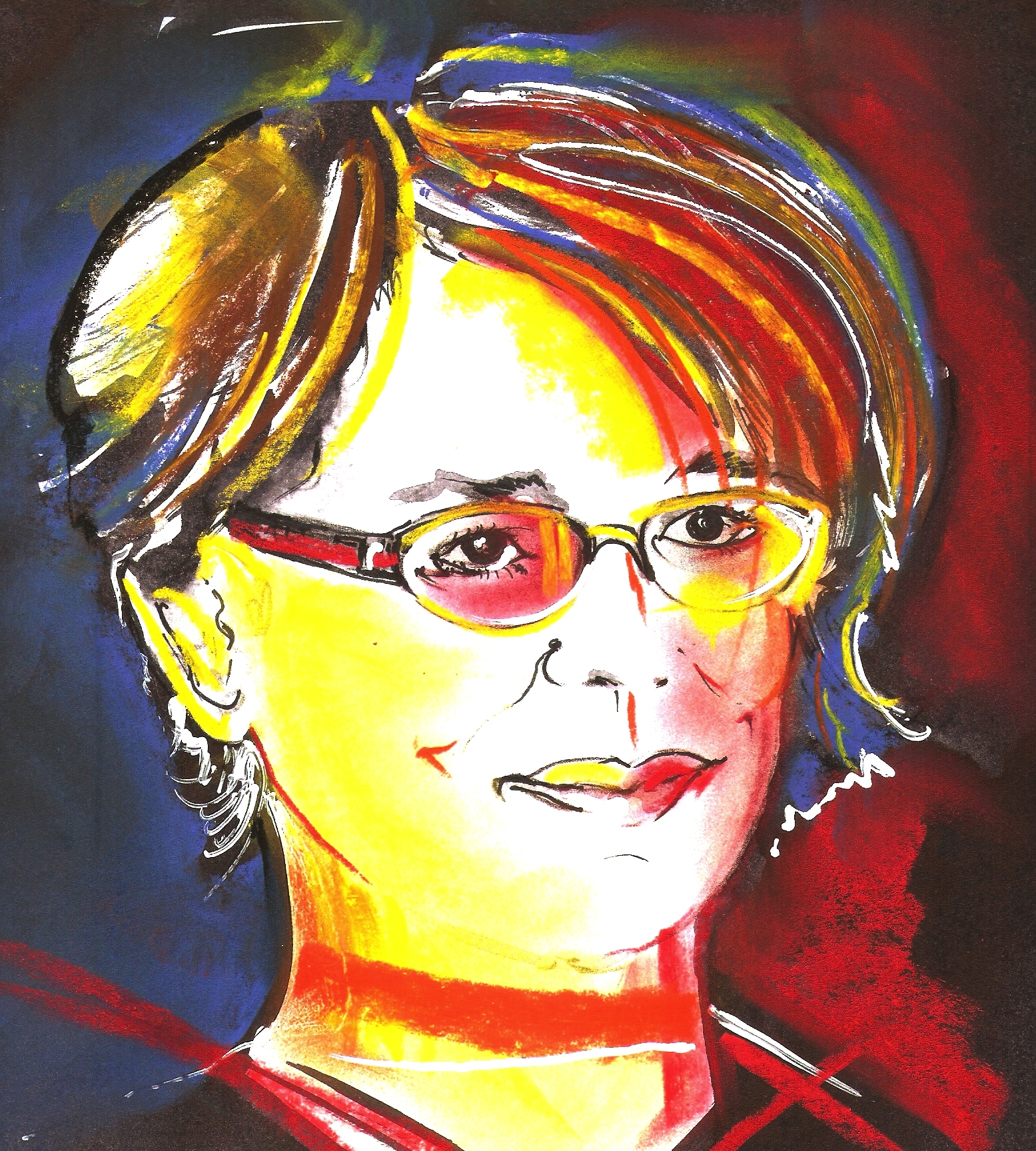
- Picture of Agata Passent by Zbigniew Kresowaty
- Born: 4 February 1973 (age 53); Warsaw, Poland
- Occupation: Journalist
- Years active: 1996–present
- Spouse: Wojciech Kuczok

Agata Maria Passent (born 4 February 1973) is a Polish journalist and writer.

== Biography ==
Passent was born in Warsaw into a family with Jewish roots, as a daughter of a journalist Daniel Passent and a poet Agnieszka Osiecka. Her Christian maternal grandparents – Wiktor Osiecki, a pianist and Maria Sztechman – survived World War II and lived in Saska Kępa. Her Jewish paternal grandparents were killed during the Holocaust in the Warsaw Ghetto. Passent, who spent her childhood in Falenica, came back to Warsaw with her family at the age of five. In 1979 they moved to Cambridge, then back to Warsaw and then to Newton, where she graduated from the Buckingham Browne & Nichols school. In 1995 Agata Passent graduated with a major in German studies from Harvard University and she returned to Poland.

In 1996 Passent debuted as a journalist in the Polish magazine, Twój Styl (En. Your Style). One year later, she founded The Okularnicy Foundation (En. The Nerds' Foundation), whose main purpose is to protect and popularise Agnieszka Osiecka's works. In the years 2005–2006 Passent was connected with Radio PiN and since 2006 she is writing feuilletons for the magazine Twoje Dziecko (En. Your Child).

Passent has been married twice: to Wojciech Borowski in 2001 and to Wojciech Kuczok, a writer, whom she married in 2013. She has a son, Jakub, with photographer Wojciech Wieteska. Passent describes herself as an atheist.

== Books ==
- Stacja Warszawa (Station Warsaw), 2007.
- Jest fantastycznie (It's fantastic), 2004.
- Miastówka, 2002.
- Olbiński i opera (Olbiński and the opera), 2003.
- Pałac wiecznie żywy (Long live the Palace), 2004.
- Kto to Pani zrobił?, 2014.
