= Henryk Zakrzewski =

Polish politician (1897– 1973)

Member of the Legislative Sejm of Poland.
- In office 4 February 1947 – 4 August 1952
- Parliamentary group: Parliamentary Union of Polish Socialists (1947–1948)
- Constituency: No. 24

Mayor of Gdynia
- In office 20 June 1945 – 20 March 1950
- Preceded by: Horst Schlichting (as the high mayor); Anatol Zbaraski (as the military administrator and self-proclaimed mayor)
- Succeeded by: Antoni Kozłowski (as the chairperson of the presidium of the National City Council)

Personal details
- Born: 22 May 1897
- Died: 5 July 1973 (aged 76)
- Resting place: Powązki Military Cemetery, Warsaw, Poland
- Party: Polish Socialist Party (1922–1948); Polish United Workers' Party (1948–1973)
- Occupation: Politician; Activist

Henryk Zakrzewski (Polish: [ˈxɛn.rɘ̟k zaˈkʂɛf.ski]; 22 May 1897 – 5 July 1973) was a politician, and local and social activist. He was a mayor of the city of Gdynia, Poland from 1945 to 1950, and a member of the Legislative Sejm of Poland from 1947 to 1952, representing the constituency no. 24, centered on the city of Gdańsk. Zakrzewski belonged to the Polish Socialist Party from 1922 to 1948, and to the Polish United Workers' Party onwards.

== Biography ==
Henryk Zakrzewski was born on 22 May 1897. He moved to the city of Gdynia, Poland in the 1920s. In 1922, he joined Polish Socialist Party. In 1928, Zakrzewski was one of the founders of the Gdynia Housing Association, and in 1937, became the chairperson of the Second Gdynia Housing Association. In 1938, he became a regional chairperson of the Worker's University Association in Gdynia.

On 20 June 1945, Zakrzewski was appointed by the Ministry of Public Administration as the mayor of Gdynia, and remained in the office until 20 March 1950. From 4 February 1947 to 4 August 1952, he was a member of the Legislative Sejm of Poland, represeting the constituency no. 24, centered on the city of Gdańsk in the Gdańsk Voivodeship. He was elected as a member of the Polish Socialist Party, as part of the Democratic Bloc electoral coalition. In 1948, it was incorporated into the Polish United Workers' Party. In the Sejm, he was a member of the Maritime and International Trade Committee, Municipal Economy and Housing Committee, and National and Local Government Administration Committee, and from 1947 to 1948, he belonged to the Parliamentary Union of Polish Socialists, a parliamentary group of the Polish Socialist Party.

Zakrzewski died on 5 July 1973, at the age of 76. He was buried at the Powązki Military Cemetery in Warsaw, Poland. From 1987 to 1991, a street in Gdynia, located within the Chwarzno-Wiczlino district, was named after him. Currently it is called Franciszka Sokoła Street.
