= Witold Zakrzewski =

Polish sailing activist

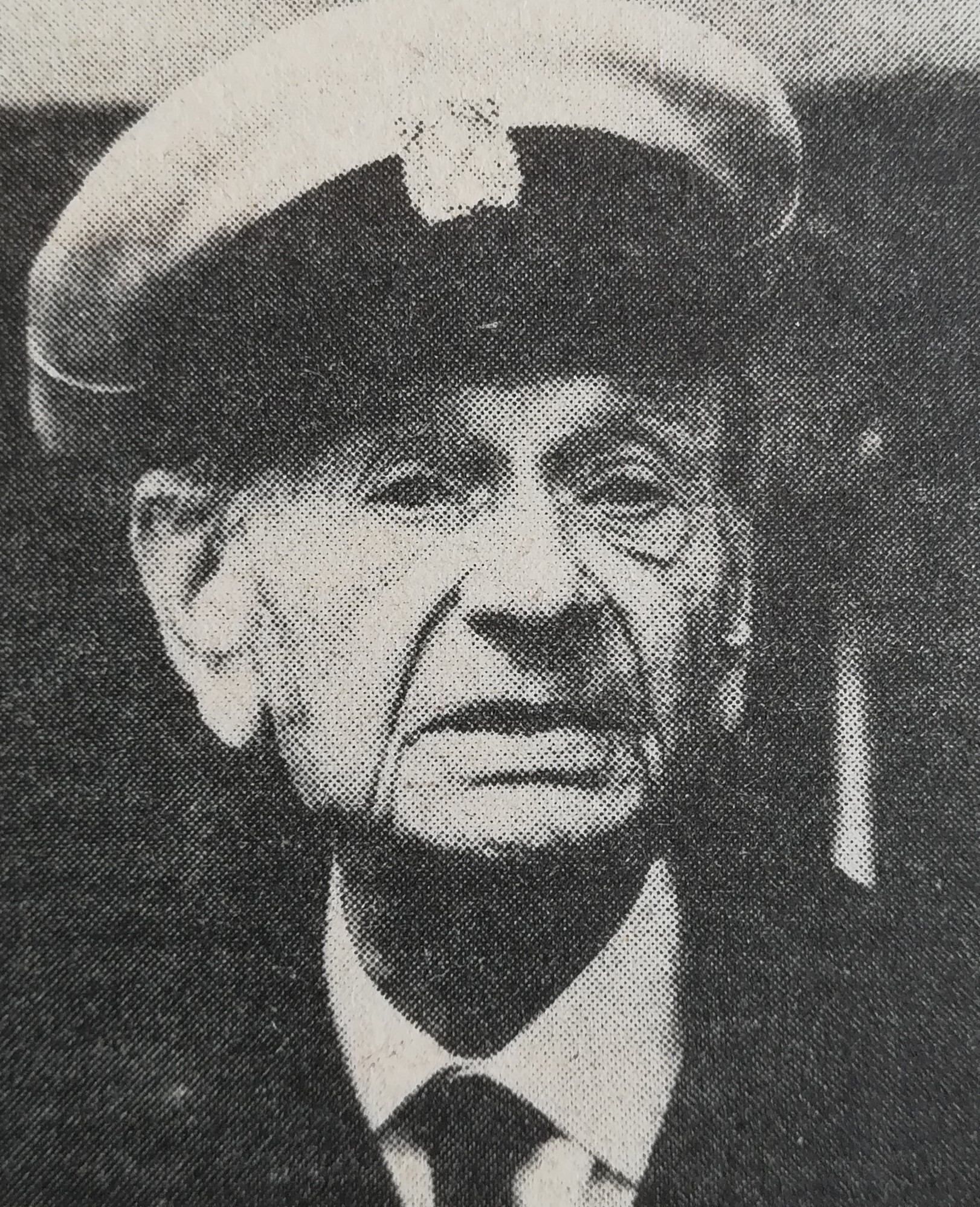
Witold Zakrzewski

Witold Zakrzewski (1903–1987) was a Polish sailing activist. A graduate of the Sea School in Tczew. Served the Polish Navy. Zakrzewski was a co-founder of the Yacht Club of Poland (Yacht Klub Polski) and a chairman of the Polish Yachting Association (Polski Związek Żeglarski; 1949–1951).
