= Kosmaczewo =

- Village
- Location within Poland
- Coordinates: 52°46′N 19°52′E
- Country: Poland
- Voivodeship: Masovian
- County: Sierpc
- Gmina: Zawidz

Kosmaczewo [kɔsmaˈt͡ʂɛvɔ] is a village in the administrative district of Gmina Zawidz, within Sierpc County, Masovian Voivodeship, in east-central Poland.
