= Borkowo Wielkie, Masovian Voivodeship =

Borkowo Wielkie
- Village
- Location within Poland
- Coordinates: 52°51′15″N 19°44′25″E
- Country: Poland
- Voivodeship: Masovian
- County: Sierpc
- Gmina: Sierpc
- Phone Prefix: (+48) 24
- Vehicle registration: EEZ

Borkowo Wielkie [bɔrˈkɔvɔ ˈvjɛlkʲɛ] is a village in the administrative district of Gmina Sierpc, within Sierpc County, Masovian Voivodeship, in east-central Poland.
