= Daniel Passent =

Polish journalist and writer (1938–2022)

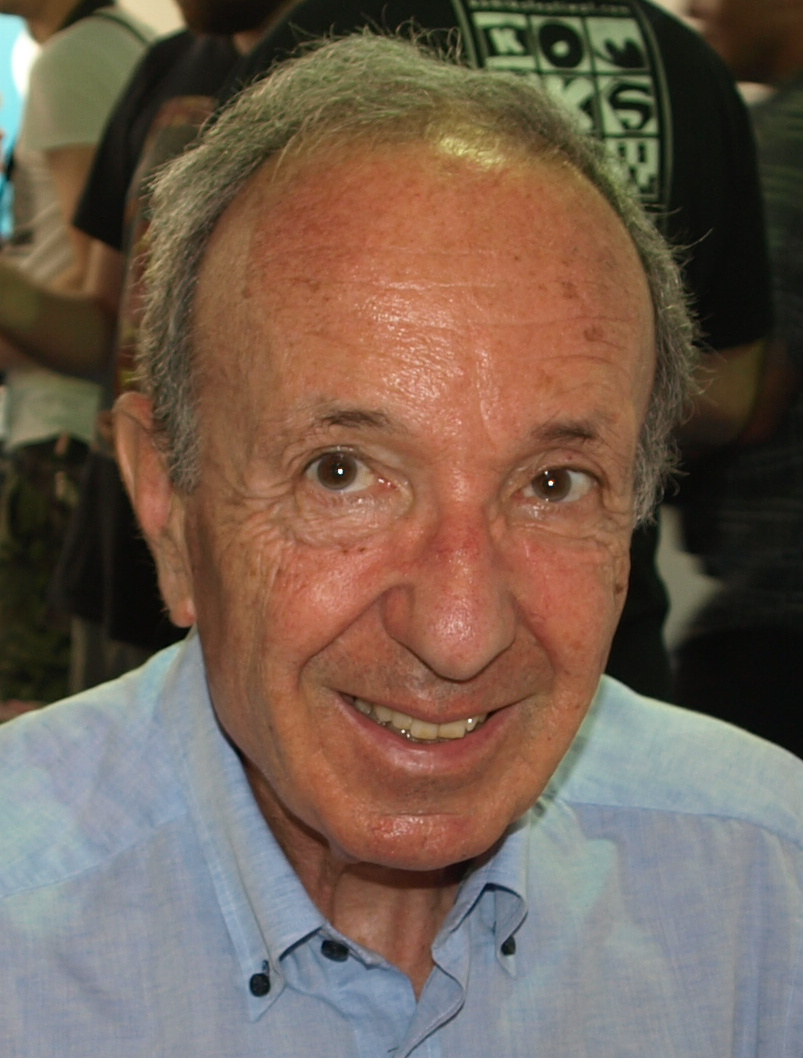

Poland Ambassador to Chile
- In office 1997–2002
- Preceded by: Zdzisław Jan Ryn
- Succeeded by: Jarosław Spyra

Personal details
- Born: 28 April 1938 Stanisławów, Poland (modern-day Ivano-Frankivsk, Ukraine)
- Died: 14 February 2022 (aged 83)
- Spouse(s): Agnieszka Osiecka; Marta Dobromirska-Passent
- Children: Agata Passent, Łukasz Dobromirski
- Education: University of Warsaw; Princeton University; Harvard University
- Profession: Journalist, columnist, writer

Daniel Passent (28 April 1938 – 14 February 2022) was a Polish journalist and writer. He was the author of the En passant blog, which was appearing as a column in a Polish weekly Polityka.

== Biography ==
Passent was born in Stanisławów, Poland (modern-day Ivano-Frankivsk, Ukraine). As a Jewish child he was saved from the Holocaust by a Polish family.

Passent studied journalism at the University of Warsaw, Andrei Zhdanov University in Leningrad, USSR (now St. Petersburg, Russia), Princeton University, and Harvard University in the 1950s and 1960s. He first wrote for a communist youth magazine Sztandar Młodych in his sophomore year at the University of Warsaw in 1956. In college, he wrote satirical texts for a student standup comedy group Studencki Teatr Satyryków (STS). There he met his wife, Agnieszka Osiecka, a Polish poet and lyricist. Their daughter, Agata Passent, is also a journalist. Since 1959 he has been working for a Polish weekly Polityka. From 1990 to 1997 he was a journalist in Boston for a Spanish monthly magazine El Diario Mundial. From 1997 to 2002 Passent served as a Polish ambassador to Chile.

In addition to his articles and columns, Passent wrote several books, among others about the Vietnam War, the Olympic Summer Games 1972 in Munich, about the drug problem in the US, and about the world class Polish tennis player, Wojciech Fibak. He also translated books and other texts by James Baldwin and Martin Luther King Jr. into Polish. He spoke Polish, English, German, Spanish, and Russian.

In 1997, Passent received Commander's Cross of the Order of Polonia Restituta.

He died on 14 February 2022, at the age of 83.

== Controversy ==
An article in a conservative Polish newspaper Dziennik, claimed that Passent worked in the 1960s as a spy for the communist government under the code names "Daniel" and "John". Credence to these claims was lent by the Gen. Kiszczak files (released by Kiszczak's widow in 2016) in which Passent shows his true loyalty to the Communist cause (just after Fr. Popiełuszko's murder by the state in 1984) by denouncing the patriotic opposition and suggesting tactics to Kiszczak. Passent asked an independent court to review such claims through a procedure called lustration; this request was denied as Poland's lustration law applies only to people holding (or running for) a public office.
