= Jan Andrzej Zakrzewski =

Jan Andrzej Zakrzewski (24 February 1920, in Skierniewice – 22 April 2007, in Warsaw) was a Polish journalist, writer, translator. Member of the Stowarzyszenie Dziennikarzy Polskich, Stowarzyszenie Pisarzy Polskich, International PEN. Awarded the Knight's Cross of the Polonia Restituta (1975), Cross of Merit (1973) and Cross of Valour.

Zakrzewski was a soldier of Invasion of Poland (1939) and he also fought in Norway (1940). During the World War II he was an officer of Polish Armed Forces in the West. After back to Poland Zakrzewski led the art agency "Artos" in Wrocław (1950). He was a contributor of weekly magazine Po Prostu (1950–1957), columnist in Głos Pracy, editor of Czytelnik (1952–1956), TV reporter (1957–1983), TV correspondent in Paris (1961–1967) and New York City (1972–1976), editor of Polskie Radio (1967–1972), radio commentator (1976–1983).

His notable works includes Opowiadania (1959), Narwik (1972), Iberyjskie wędrówki (1973), Ameryka karaibska (1979), Jak zostać prezydentem (1980), Zapiski ze złości (1992).
