= Skaldowie =

Polish rock band

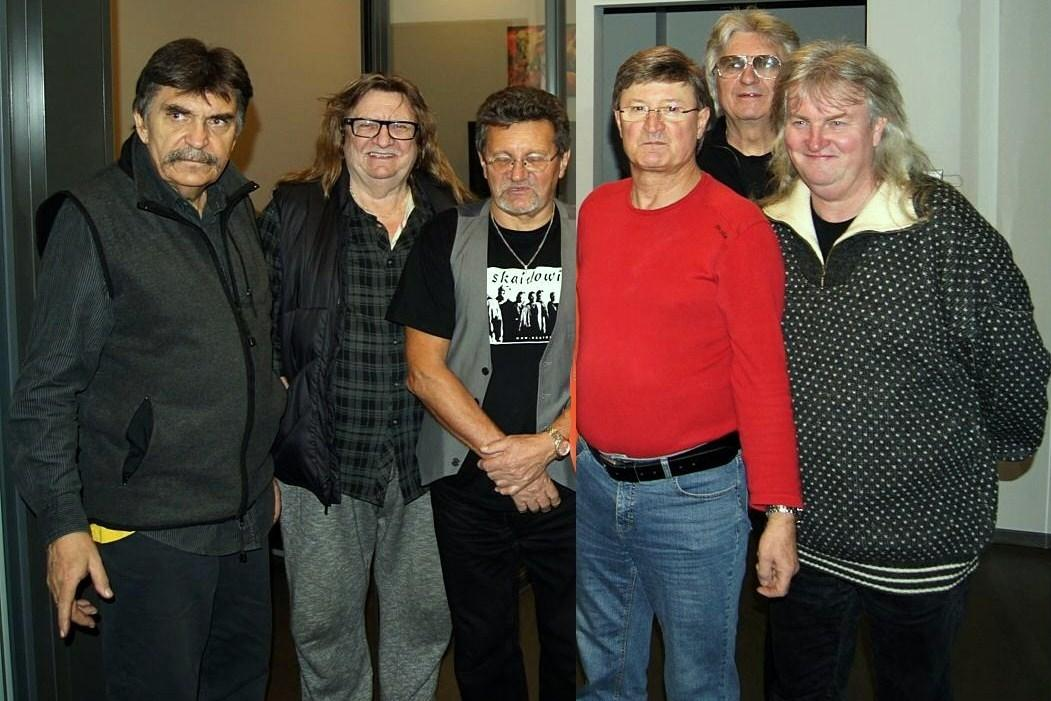
- From left: Jan Budziaszek, Andrzej Zieliński, Jacek Zieliński, Jerzy Tarsiński, Konrad Ratyński, Grzegorz Górkiewicz; 2012

Background information
- Origin: Kraków, Poland
- Genres: Pop, folk, rock, folk-rock, jazz-rock, psychedelic rock, progressive folk
- Years active: 1965-1982, 1987-present
- Labels: Pronit, Polskie Nagrania Muza, Kameleon Records
- Members: Andrzej Zieliński, Jacek Zieliński, Konrad Ratyński, Jerzy Tarsiński, Jan Budziaszek, Grzegorz Górkiewicz
- Past members: Feliks Naglicki, Zygmunt Kaczmarski, Janusz Kaczmarski, Jerzy Fasiński, Marek Jamrozy, Tadeusz Gogosz, Krzysztof Paliwoda, Marian Pawlik, Stanisław Wenglorz, Marek Surzyn, Jerzy Bezucha, Benedykt Radecki, Andrzej Mossakowski, Tadeusz Toczyski, Jerzy Piotrowski, Wiktor Kierzkowski, Zbigniew Balicki

Skaldowie (namesake: The Skalds) is an art rock band which formed in Kraków, Poland in 1965. With their musical training and proximity to the folklore-rich area of Podhale, many of their tracks incorporate themes of rock, folk, and classical music.

Skaldowie received numerous national awards between 1966 and 1980, and were one of the most popular musical groups in Poland at the time.

== Discography ==
=== Studio albums ===
- Skaldowie (1967)
- Wszystko Mi Mówi, Że Mnie Ktoś Pokochał (1968)
- Cała Jesteś W Skowronkach (1969)
- Od Wschodu Do Zachodu Słońca (1970)
- Ty (1971)
- Krywań, Krywań (1973)
- Wszystkim Zakochanym (1973)
- Stworzenia Świata Część Druga (1977)
- Szanujmy Wspomnienia (1977)
- Rezerwat Miłości (1979)
- Droga Ludzi (1980)
- Nie Domykajmy Drzwi (1990)
- Harmonia Świata (2006)
- Oddychać I Kochać (2009)
- Pieśń Nad Pieśniami, Czyli Ballada O Człowieka O Miłości (2011)

=== Live Albums ===
- Cisza Krzyczy - Leningrad 1972 (An Official Live Bootleg) (2007)
- Z Archiwum Polskiego Radia, Vol.16-17. Nagrania Koncertowe Z Lat 1966–1990 (2008)
- Live in Germany 1974 (2012)
- Live in Germany 1972 (2013)
