= Urszulewka =

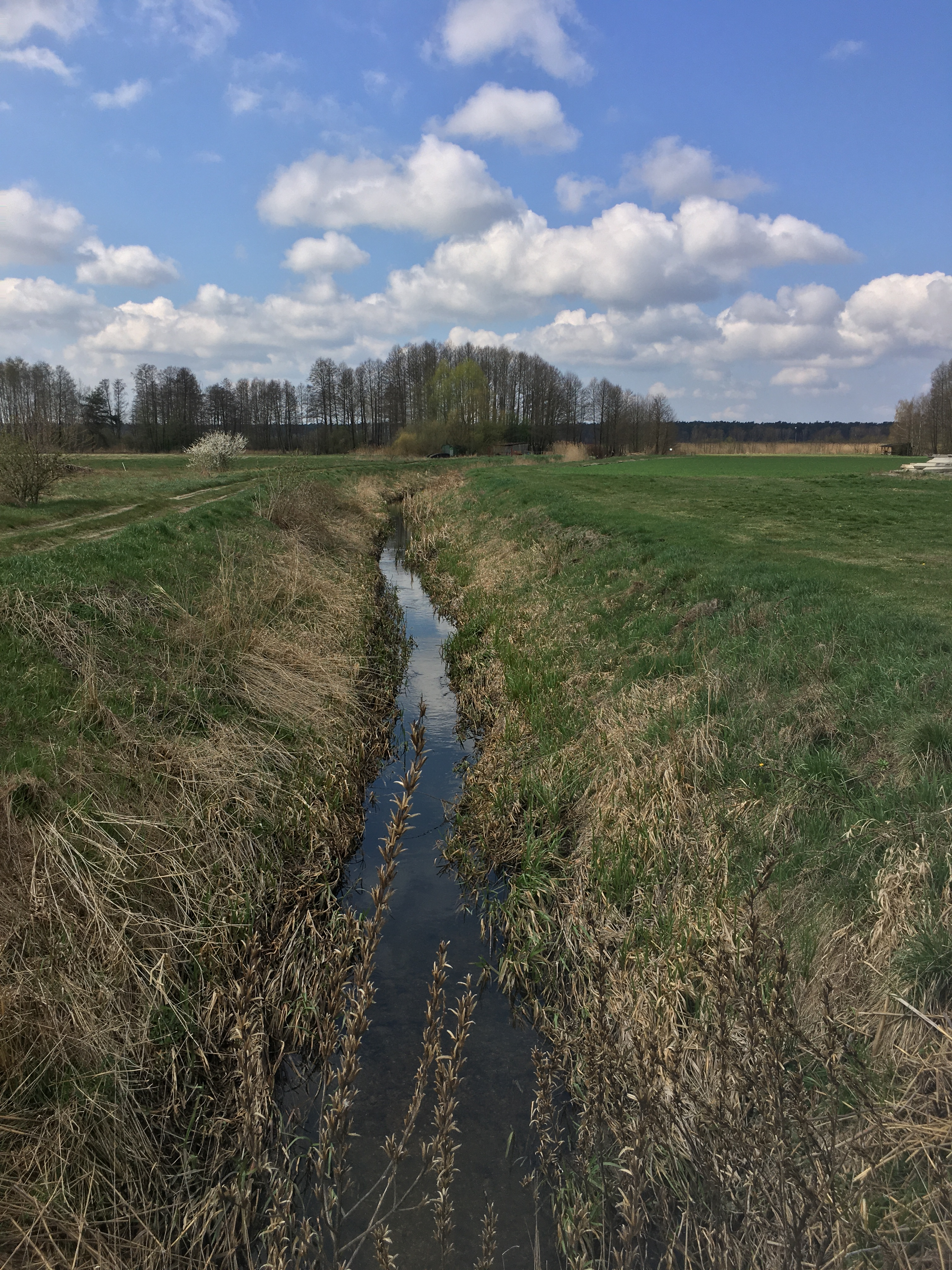
- Urszulewka in Słupia

Location
- Country: Poland
- Voivodeship: Masovian
- County (Powiat): Sierpc
- Gmina: Gmina Szczutowo

Physical characteristics
- Source: Lake Urszula
  - location: eastern lakeshore, near Słupia
  - coordinates: 52°57′58″N 19°35′18″E
  - elevation: 118.4 m (388 ft)
- Mouth: Skrwa Prawa
  - location: near Dziki Bór
  - coordinates: 52°58′12″N 19°38′06″E
  - elevation: 115.0 m (377.3 ft)
- Length: 3.38 km (2.10 mi)
- Basin size: 35.16 km^{2} (13.58 sq mi)

Basin features
- Progression: Skrwa Prawa→ Vistula→ Baltic Sea

The Urszulewka is a river of Poland, and a tributary of the Skrwa Prawa. It flows out of Lake Urszulewskie, and joins the Skrwa Prawa near Dziki Bór.
