= Sierpc =

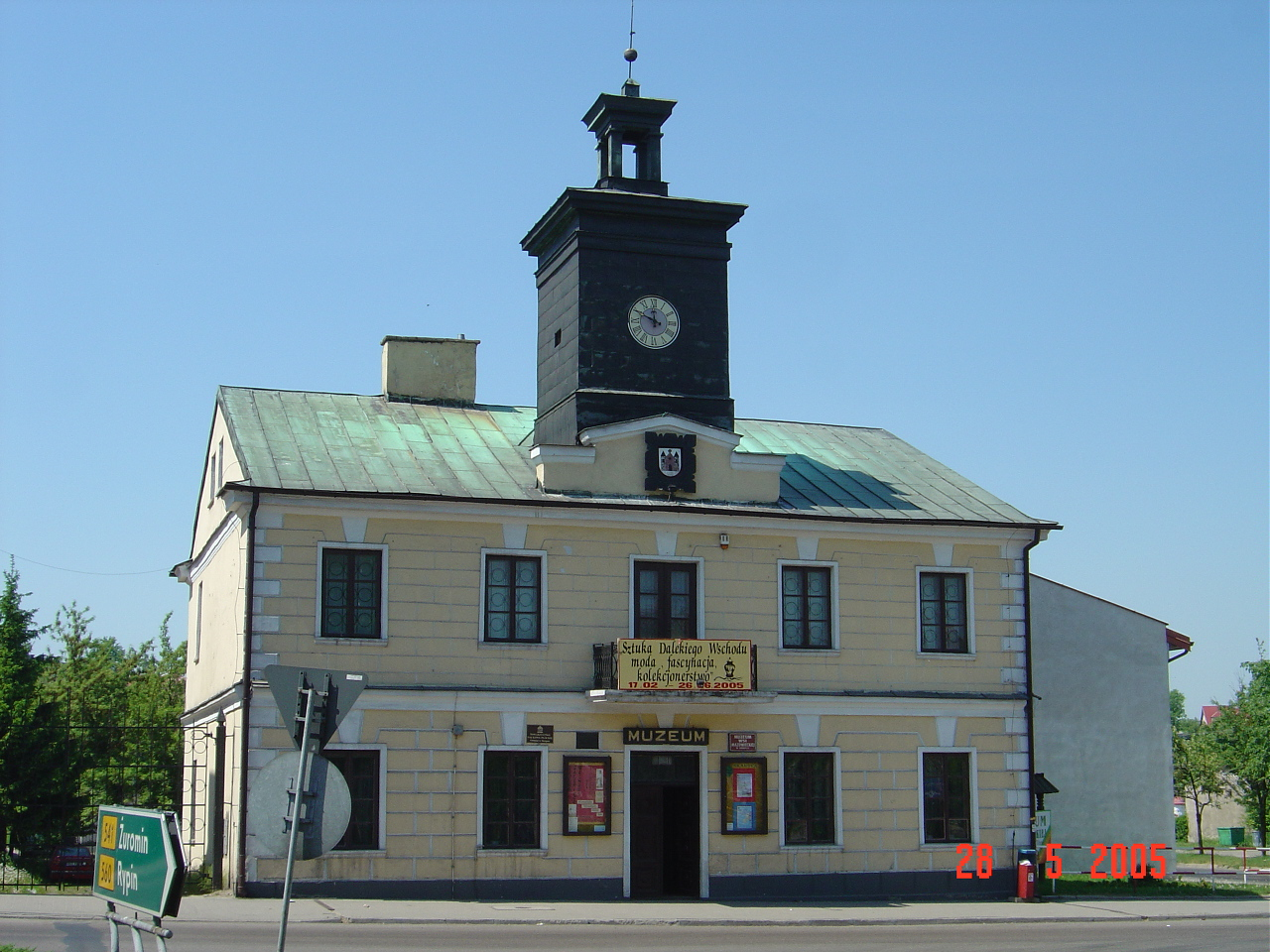
- Old town hall

- Flag Coat of arms

- Location within Poland
- Coordinates: 52°53′N 19°40′E
- Country: Poland
- Voivodeship: Masovian
- County: Sierpc
- Gmina: Sierpc (urban gmina)
- Established: 10th century
- Town rights: 1322

Government
  - Mayor: Jarosław Perzyński

Area
  - Total: 18.6 km^{2} (7.2 sq mi)

Population (2010)
  - Total: 18,368
  - Density: 988/km^{2} (2,560/sq mi)
- Time zone: UTC+1 (CET)
  - Summer (DST): UTC+2 (CEST)
- Postal code: 09-200
- Area code: +48 024
- Vehicle registration: WSE
- Website: http://www.sierpc.pl

Sierpc (Polish: [ɕɛrpt͡s]) is a town in north-central Poland, in the north-west part of the Masovian Voivodeship, about 125 km (78 mi) northwest of Warsaw. It is the capital of Sierpc County. Its population is 16,941 (2023).

Sierpc is a town with over a thousand years of history, whose landmarks include several medieval Gothic churches and the Museum of the Masovian Countryside. Sierpc is a railroad junction and is known for its beer and cheese production. It is a member of Cittaslow.

== History ==
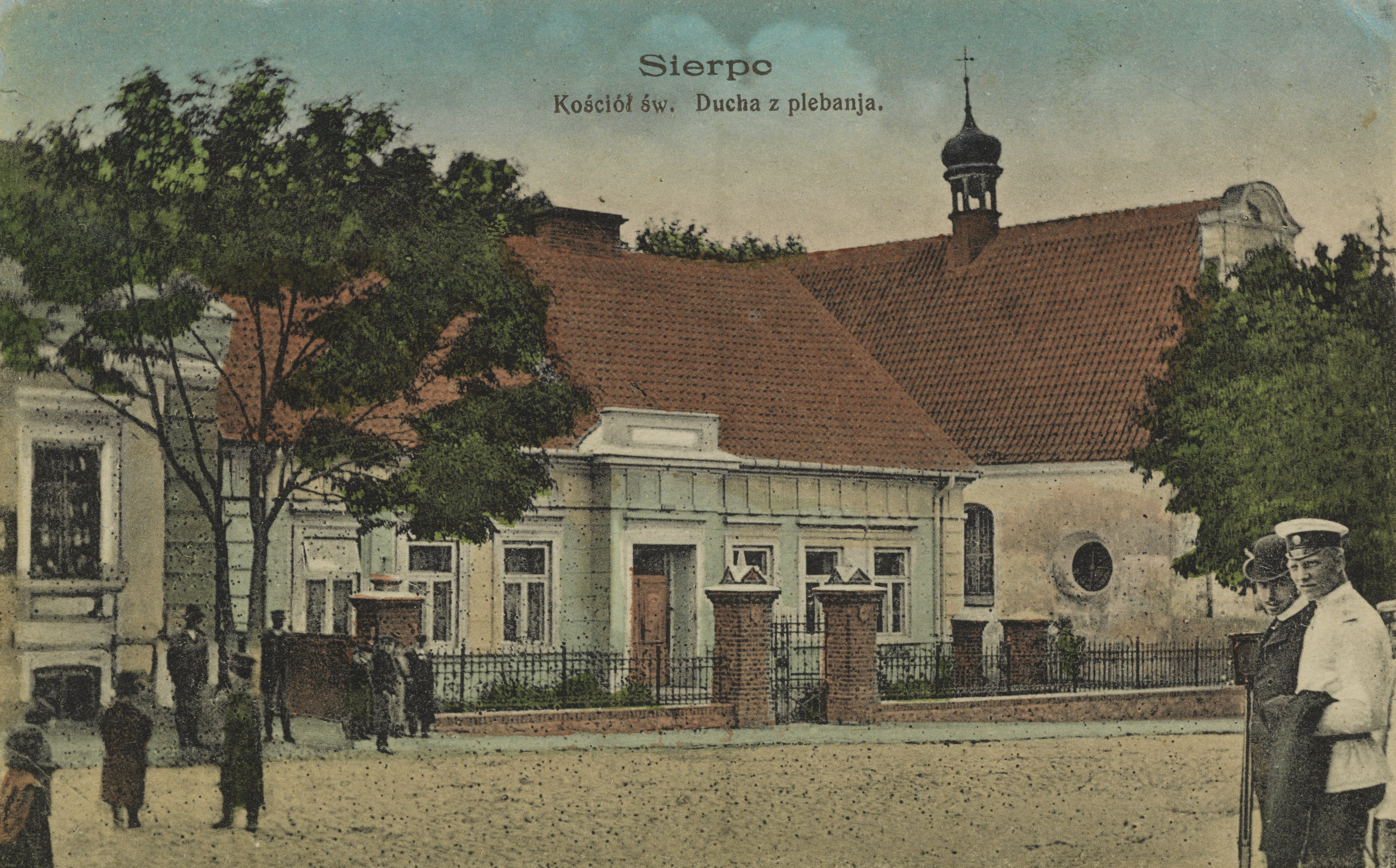
Holy Spirit church and rectory in the early 20th century

In the 10th century Sierpc was a stronghold of early Piast-ruled Poland. According to tradition, a church was built in 1003. The oldest known mention of Sierpc comes from 1155. In 1322 Sierpc received town rights. The town then was a property of Płock bishops. Its name is of Polish origin, and comes either from the word sierp ("sickle") and the name of the Sierpienica river, or from the old Polish given names Wszepraw/Siepraw or Sierpek. In 1509 Polish King Sigismund I the Old granted the local cloth manufacturers a "protective make", placed on a lead seal on a cloth base, this privilege was given to the most significant towns. It was a private town and county seat, administratively located in the Płock Voivodeship in the Greater Poland Province. In the 17th century, there was a sizeable Scottish community in Sierpc.

In 1793 the town started to fall into decline, it was annexed by Prussia in the Second Partition of Poland. In 1807 regained by Poles, it became part of the short-lived Duchy of Warsaw, and in 1815 it became part of Congress Poland, later on forcibly integrated into the Russian Empire. In 1831, after the unsuccessful Polish November Uprising against Russia, Sierpc was destroyed during military operations and a plague, but started to recover slowly. During the January Uprising, on February 8, 1863, the town was captured by Polish insurgents and then recaptured by the Russians. In 1867 Sierpc regained a position of a district town. Start of the time of a fast economic development. After World War I, in 1918, Poland regained independence and Sierpc was reintegrated with Poland.

During the Polish–Soviet War, on August 12, 1920, the town was captured by the Soviets, who plundered it and occupied it for several days. In 1921 Sierpc's population of 6,722 included 2,861 (42.5%) Jews.

=== World War II ===
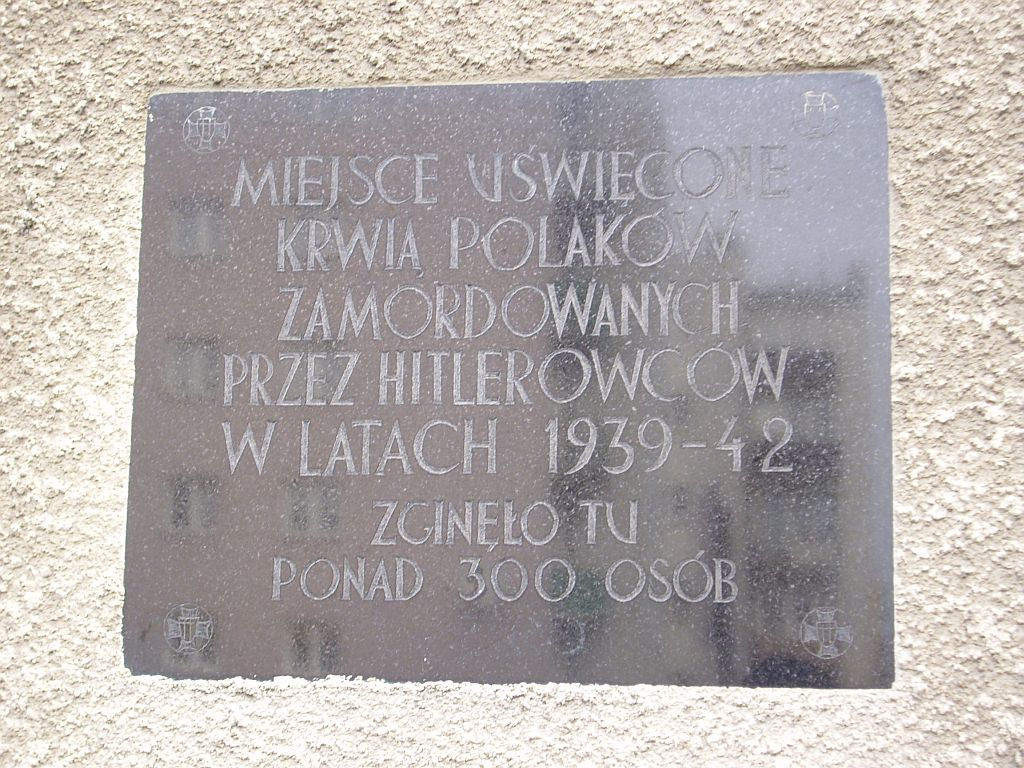
Memorial plaque at the place where the Germans murdered over 300 Poles in 1939-1942

During World War II from 1939 to 1945 Sierpc was under German occupation. It was then renamed to Sichelberg to remove traces of Polish origin. The Germans established a prison for Poles in the town. Dozens of local disabled people were murdered by the Germans in March 1940 in the nearby Troska forest. On April 5, 1940 the Germans carried out mass arrests of about 600 Poles in the town and the county, who were then imprisoned in two local prisons. Local priest Bronisław Kolator was among Polish priests murdered in the Soldau concentration camp (see Nazi persecution of the Catholic Church in Poland). About 2,000 Poles were expelled from Sierpc in February 1940, and another 400 were expelled in December 1940. People were first deported to the Soldau concentration camp and afterwards to the General Government in the more eastern part of German-occupied Poland, while their houses and workshops were handed over to German colonists in accordance to the Lebensraum policy. A German forced labour camp was operated in the town.

As part of the Holocaust, the Germans destroyed Sierpc's Jewish community. On 8 Nov 1939, the Jews of the town were deported to ghettoes from which they were eventually sent to Nazi concentration camps. During the Holocaust, approximately five thousand Jews from Sierpc and its environs were murdered. An organization of Jewish Holocaust survivors from Sierpc compiled a large compendium of testimony on Jewish life in Sierpc before the war, relationships between the Jewish and Polish communities in the town, and the horrors which the Jews of Sierpc suffered in the Holocaust.

== Places of interest ==
Historic churches of Sierpc

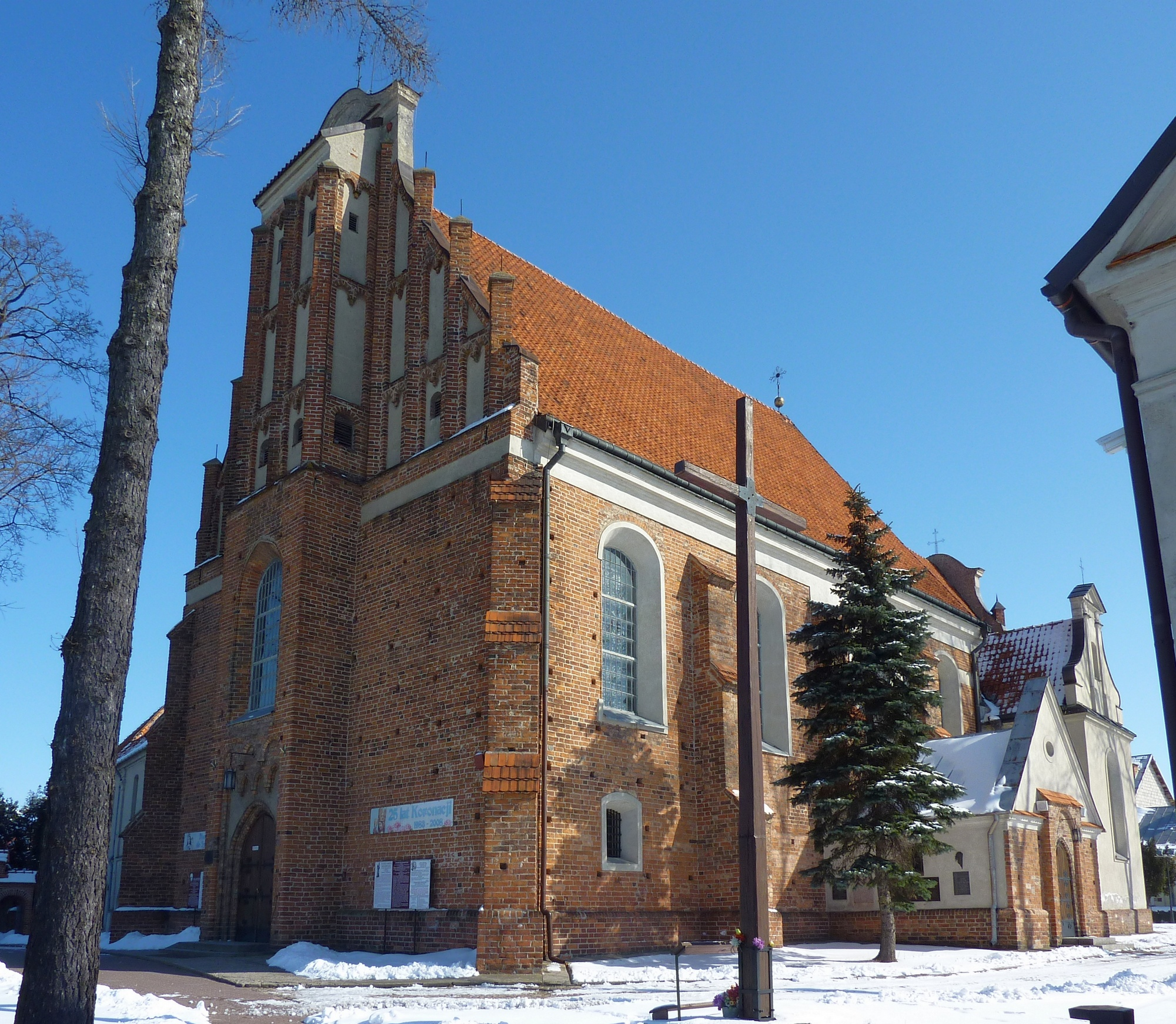
Gothic-Baroque Benedictine Church of the Assumption

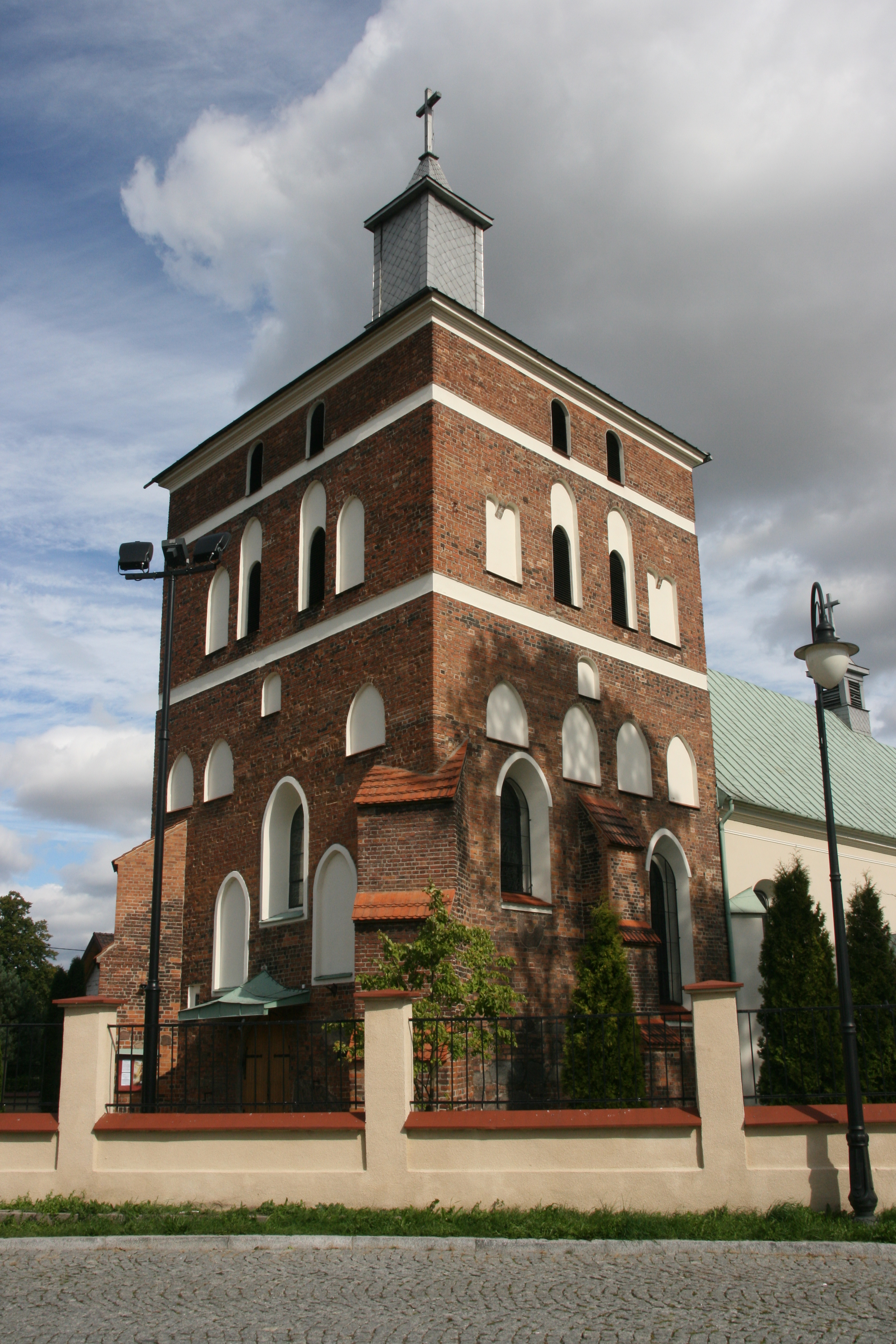
Gothic-Renaissance-Baroque Saints Vitus and Modest church

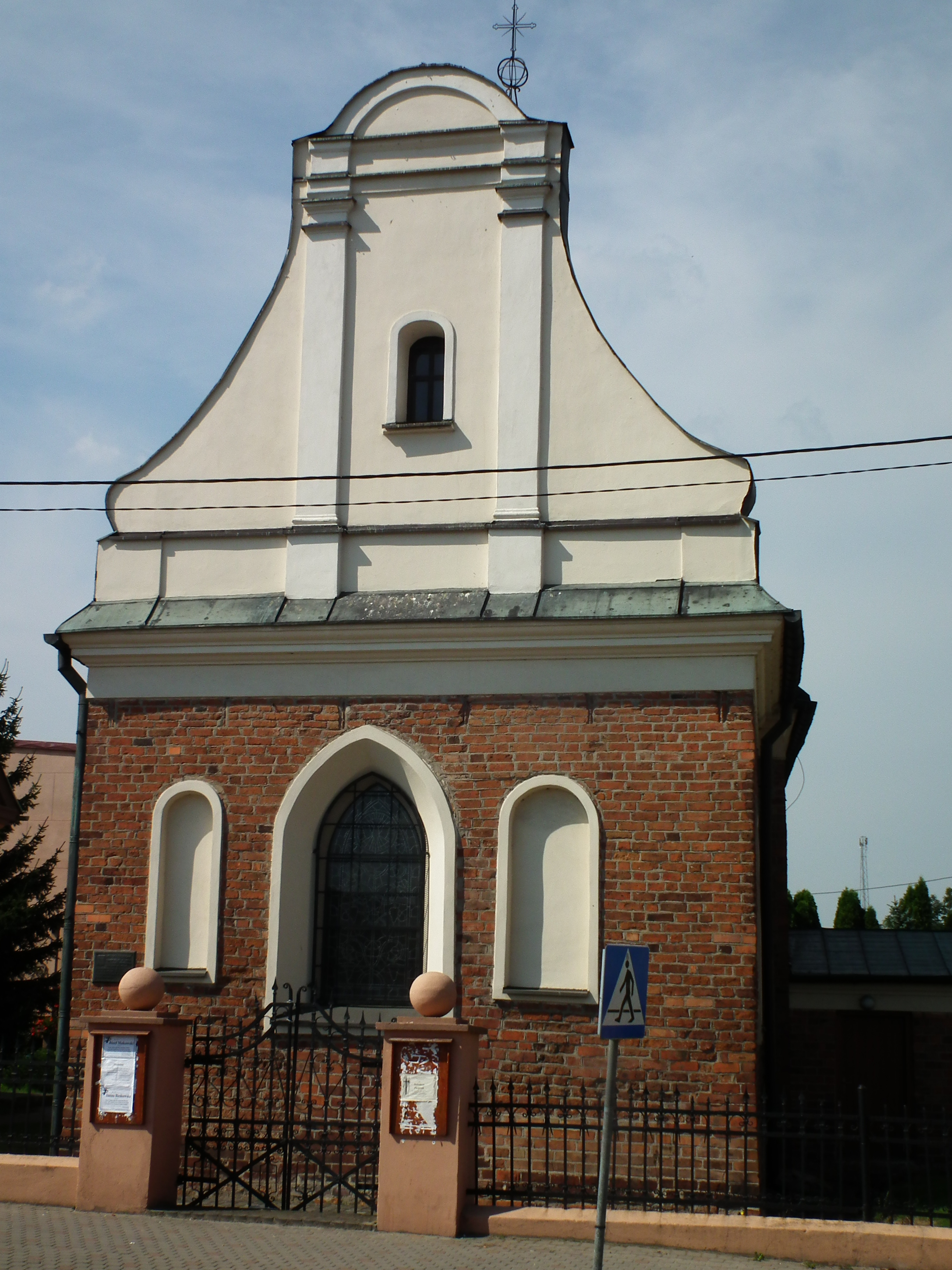
Gothic-Baroque Holy Spirit church

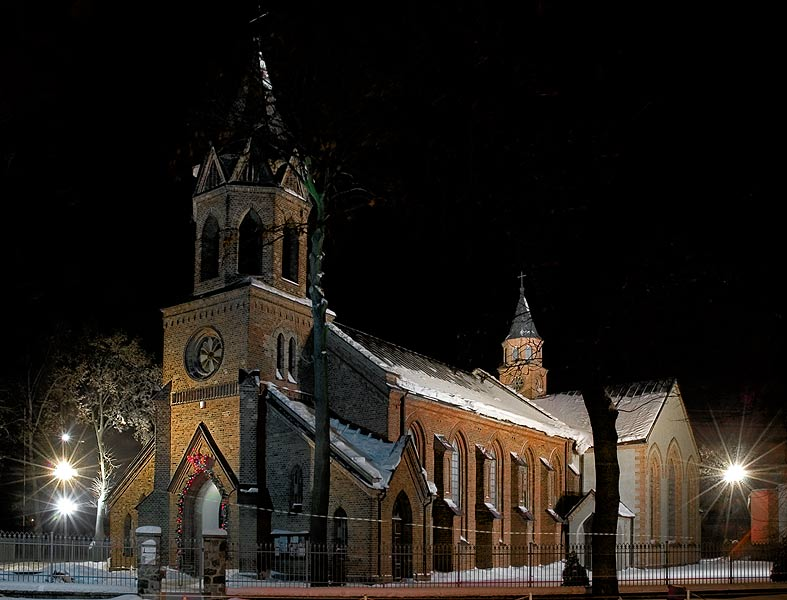
Gothic Revival Saint Stanislaus Kostka church

=== The Museum of the Countryside ===
It is an open-air museum and is located in the suburbs of Sierpc in the valley of the Sierpienica River and its confluence with the Skrwa Prawa. Though it looks like a separate and independent village because of its great area (about 60.5 hectares) and because it is fenced, the museum is included within the town's borders. The village is made up of 11 farms (houses - cabins, barns, cowsheds, granaries, pigsties), an inn, a blacksmith's workshop, an oil - mill, a windmill, a manor house, a small chapel and a wooden church. Everything was collected from different regions of Masovia. The architecture of houses reminds that from 19th or early 20th century. Also inside the houses there are pieces of furniture, utensils, equipment and hand-made decorations which are appropriate to the epoch. Each season there are exhibitions devoted to traditional Masovian customs i.e. "Christmas in Mazovie Region", "Easter in Mazovie Region". Also children can find something interesting for them : "Palm Sunday in Skansen museum", "Sunday in Skansen museum", "Cooking in the middle of the glade", "Children's Day in Skansen museum", "Honey harvest in Skansen museum" or "Harvest season in Skansen museum".

A few movies have used the museum as a location. The most famous are: Pan Tadeusz, Ogniem i mieczem and Szwadron.

=== The church under the invocation of the Holy Ghost ===
The church was built in the 16th century. At the beginning it was a chapel near a hospital. The church was built in the Gothic style and later rebuilt in Baroque style. A fire in 17th century destroyed the church completely and after second rebuilt it lost its original form. The most valuable relic, not only of church but of the town are pieces of paintings from the Middle Ages and a sculpture from the 16th century "Generosity's Throne" made by the pupils of Veit Stoss. Now it's in main altar.

=== "Kasztelanka" manor house ===
The manor house was built at the turn of the 17th and 18th century and, undoubtedly, it is one of the most important monuments in the Sierpc area and the oldest architectonic laic object in the town. It is a timber house with a thatched roof. There are plenty of mysterious legends and stories about "Kasztelanka" and the adjoining Benedictine monastery which is connected to it via a corridor. The monastery is more massive and solid, indicating it may have had a defensive purpose, perhaps against a Swedish attack.

== Demographics ==
Historical population

| Year | Pop. | ±% |
|---|---|---|
| 1897 | 8,634 | — |
| 1910 | 8,001 | −7.3% |
| 1921 | 6,722 | −16.0% |
| 1931 | 10,051 | +49.5% |

| Year | Pop. | ±% |
|---|---|---|
| 1939 | 13,000 | +29.3% |
| 1950 | 9,324 | −28.3% |
| 1960 | 10,931 | +17.2% |
| 2010 | 18,368 | +68.0% |

== Transport ==
It is located at the intersection of the national road No 10, which connects Warsaw and Toruń, and voivodeship roads No 541 and 560. Sierpc is a rail junction of local importance, where two lines cross: Kutno-Brodnica and Nasielsk-Toruń.

== Economy ==
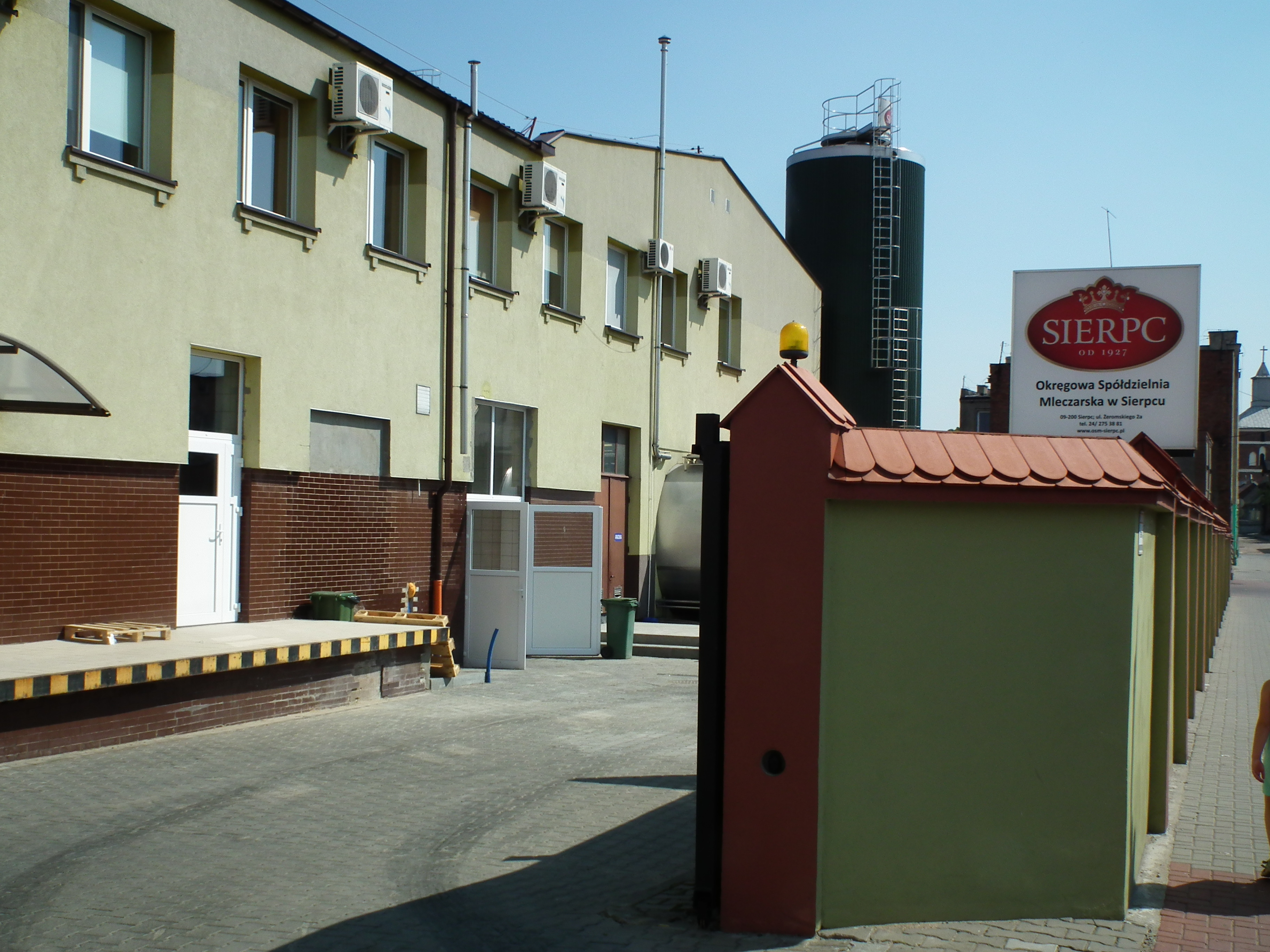
OSM Sierpc dairy cooperative

The Kasztelan brewery and OSM Sierpc dairy cooperative are located in the town.

== Asteroid ==
The 199950 Sierpc asteroid is named after the town.

== Notable residents ==
- Zbigniew Girzyński (born 1973), politician
- Anna Jagodzinska (born 1987), model
