= Chraponianka =

Location
- Country: Poland
- Voivodeship: Masovian
- Gminy: Gmina Lutocin; Gmina Rościszewo

Physical characteristics
- Source: Swojęcianka
  - location: near Siemcichy, Gmina Lutocin
  - coordinates: 53°02′27.0″N 19°49′02.0″E
  - elevation: 125.3 m (411 ft)
- Mouth: Skrwa Prawa
  - location: north of Pianki, Gmina Rościszewo
  - coordinates: 52°57′02.0″N 19°42′49.0″E
  - elevation: 112.7 m (370 ft)
- Length: 19.27 km (11.97 mi)
- Basin size: 111.84 km^{2} (43.18 mi^{2})

Basin features
- Progression: Skrwa Prawa→ Vistula→ Baltic Sea

The Chraponianka is a small river of Poland. It becomes a tributary of the Skrwa Prawa near Pianki.
