= Parzen =

Parzen could refer to:

- Parzeń, a village in Masovian Voivodeship, Poland
- Emanuel Parzen, American statistician
- Jeremy Parzen (born 1967), American writer
