= Brudzeń Duży =

- Village
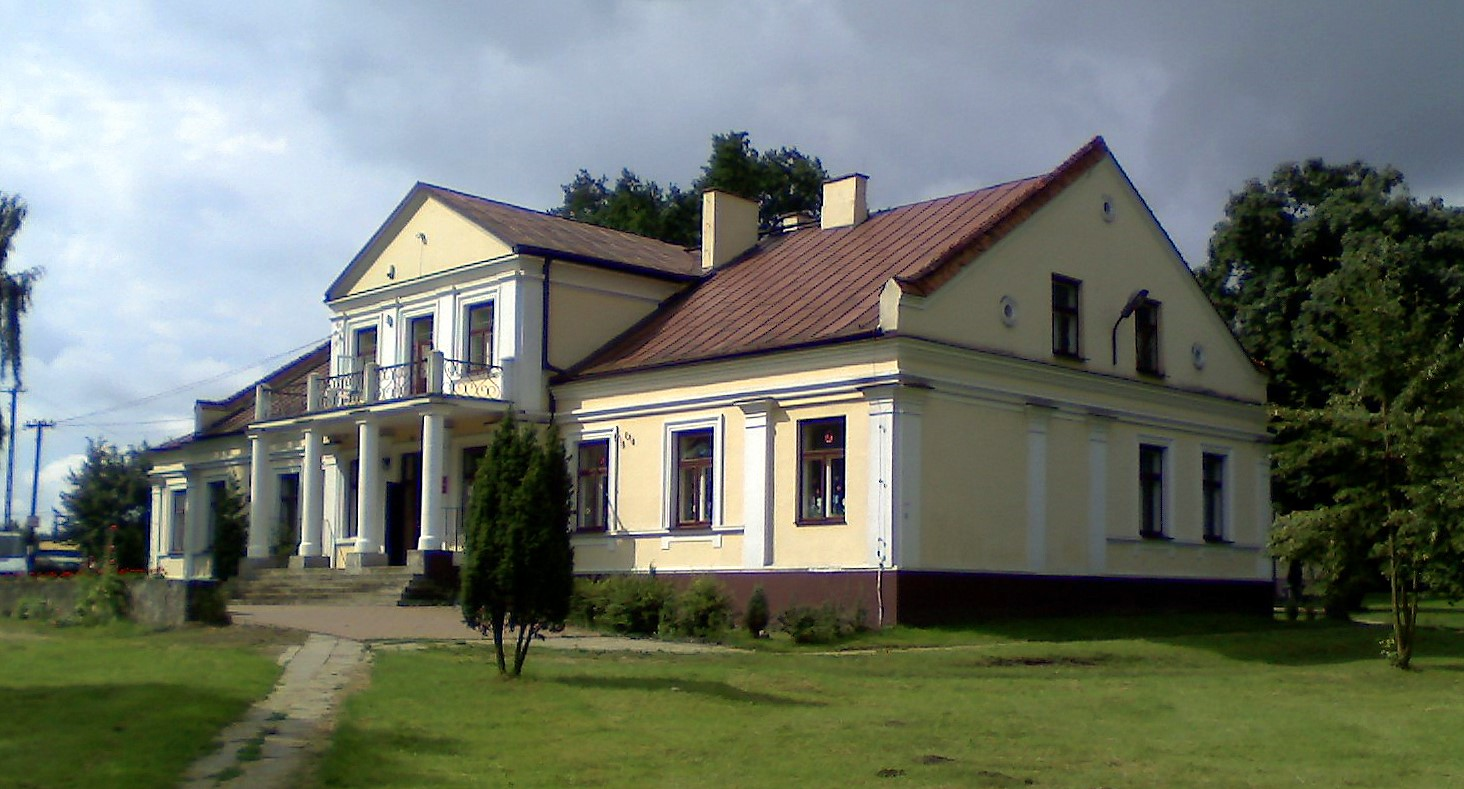
- Late 19th century manor house in Brudzeń Duży

- Location within Poland
- Coordinates: 52°40′N 19°30′E
- Country: Poland
- Voivodeship: Masovian
- County: Płock
- Gmina: Brudzeń Duży

Population
  - Total: 1,053 (2,011)
- Time zone: UTC+1 (CET)
  - Summer (DST): UTC+2 (CEST)
- Website: https://ugbrudzenduzy.bip.org.pl/

Brudzeń Duży [ˈbrud͡zɛɲ ˈduʐɨ] is a village in Płock County, Masovian Voivodeship, in central Poland. It is the seat of the gmina (administrative district) called Gmina Brudzeń Duży.

The village is the birthplace of scholar Paweł Włodkowic (ca. 1370–1435).

Six Polish citizens were murdered by Nazi Germany in the village during World War II.

== See also ==
- Brudzeń Landscape Park
