= Myśliborzyce =

Myśliborzyce may refer to the following places:

- Myśliborzyce, Masovian Voivodeship (east-central Poland)
- Myśliborzyce, Opole Voivodeship (south-west Poland)
- Myśliborzyce, West Pomeranian Voivodeship (north-west Poland)
