= Vinica =

Vinica may refer to places:

== Places ==
- Vinica, Tomislavgrad, Bosnia and Herzegovina
- Vinica, Varaždin County, Croatia
- Vinica, North Macedonia
  - Vinica Municipality, North Macedonia
- Vinica, Veľký Krtíš District, Slovakia
- Vinica, Črnomelj, Slovenia
- Cetore, Izola Municipality, Slovenia, known as Vinica from 1957 to 1988

== See also ==
- Vinice, Slovenia
- Vinnytsia, Ukraine
- Vinnytsia Raion, Vinnytsia Oblast, Ukraine
- Vinnytsia Oblast, Ukraine
- Winnica (disambiguation), several places in Poland
