= Rokicie =

Rokicie may refer to the following places:

- Rokicie, Płock County in Masovian Voivodeship (central Poland)
- Rokicie, Sierpc County in Masovian Voivodeship (central Poland)
- Rokicie, West Pomeranian Voivodeship (north-west Poland)
