= Bobrownica =

Location
- Country: Poland

Physical characteristics
- Mouth
  - location: Skrwa Prawa
  - coordinates: 52°41′35″N 19°29′29″E

Basin features
- Progression: Skrwa Prawa→ Vistula→ Baltic Sea

The Bobrownica is a river of Poland. It becomes a right-bank tributary of the Skrwa Prawa near Turza Mała.
