= Siecień =

- Village
- Location within Poland
- Coordinates: 52°36′49″N 19°31′10″E
- Country: Poland
- Voivodeship: Masovian
- County: Płock
- Gmina: Brudzeń Duży
- Established: 14th century
- Area: 6.12 km^{2} (2.36 sq mi)
- Population (2009): 1,040
  - Density: 156/km^{2} (400/sq mi)
- Time zone: UTC+1 (CET)
  - Summer (DST): UTC+2 (CEST)
- Postal code: 09-411
- Area code: +48 24
- Car Plates: WPL
- Website: siecien.pl

Siecień [ˈɕɛt͡ɕɛɲ] is a village in the province of Masovia in Poland. From 1999 in Płock County, Masovian Voivodship.

== History ==
The village was built between the 13th and 15th centuries (former names: Siecienie, Sieciń, Siecin). In the 16th and 17th century, the owner of Siecień was Stanisław Siecieński, the bishop of Przemyśl. In the 18th century, Siecień was in possession of Orłowski's and Gembart's. In the 19th century the village was owned by Miastkowscy' the Bończa, then Turscy's and Cielecki's, and then Węsierscy's the Belin. The last owners of Siecień were Duczymińscy's-till 1945.

There was about 22 households in Siecień in 1825. Siecień's goods in 1886 consisted of farm: Siecień, Radotki and Murzynowo. There was distillery in the farm (operative until 1940), watermill, inn and a church of st. Joseph. The church was built in about the 15th century (mentioned about 1442). Before that, the church was made of wood. Probably previous church was pw. Announcing Maria's the Holiest Unmarried woman. The building of present church begun in 1584 Stanisław's staraniem the przemyskiego bishop's Siecieńskiego (he died in 1620). The building of church was finished in 1611 and consecrated in 1619. Church gotycko - Renaissance, situated on hill among trees, informed, interesting interiors. The church be brick from brick, the tower in Gothic arrangement, the trunk of church in block arrangement. Inside the organ instrument from ok. 1890 year of firm the Apolinarego the Dubulewicza from Rypina. The tombstone is also the Gembartów as well as the portrait of founder of church – Stanisław the Siecieńskiego. The remainders of landscape park in village are with beginning XX age according to project the Valerian the Kronenberga.

== Monuments ==
- Gothic-Renaissance Church

== Institutions operating in Siecień ==
- Headquarters of Roman Catholic parish
- Center of health in Siecień
- Wedding house

== Education ==
- Primary School
