= Wincentowo, Płock County =

Wincentowo
- Village
- Location within Poland
- Coordinates: 52°42′38″N 19°28′4″E
- Country: Poland
- Voivodeship: Masovian
- County: Płock
- Gmina: Brudzeń Duży

Wincentowo [vint͡sɛnˈtɔvɔ] is a village in the administrative district of Gmina Brudzeń Duży, within Płock County, Masovian Voivodeship, in east-central Poland.
