= Parzeń-Janówek =

- Village
- Location within Poland
- Coordinates: 52°39′N 19°32′E
- Country: Poland
- Voivodeship: Masovian
- County: Płock
- Gmina: Brudzeń Duży
- Population: 76

Parzeń-Janówek [ˈpaʐɛɲ jaˈnuvɛk] is a village in the administrative district of Gmina Brudzeń Duży, within Płock County, Masovian Voivodeship, in east-central Poland.
