= Rembielin, Płock County =

Rembielin
- Village
- Location within Poland
- Coordinates: 52°38′N 19°27′E
- Country: Poland
- Voivodeship: Masovian
- County: Płock
- Gmina: Brudzeń Duży
- Population: 177

Rembielin [rɛmˈbjɛlin] is a village in the administrative district of Gmina Brudzeń Duży, within Płock County, Masovian Voivodeship, in east-central Poland.
