= Sierpienica =

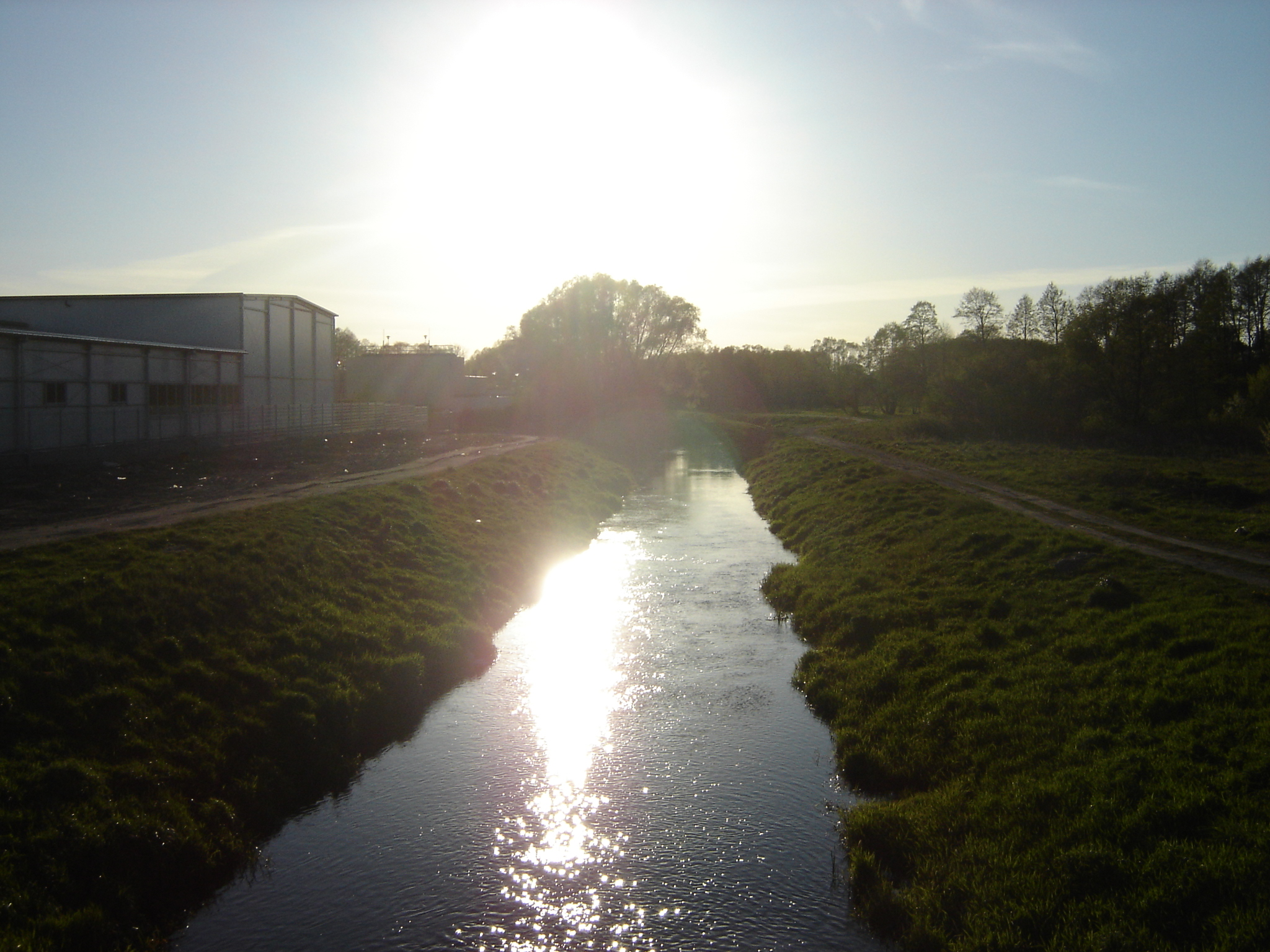

Location
- Country: Poland

Physical characteristics
- Mouth
  - location: Skrwa Prawa
  - coordinates: 52°52′01″N 19°37′50″E

Basin features
- Progression: Skrwa Prawa→ Vistula→ Baltic Sea

The Sierpienica is a river of Poland. It becomes a tributary of the Skrwa Prawa near Sierpc.
