= Izabelin, Płock County =

Izabelin
- Village
- Location within Poland
- Coordinates: 52°42′58″N 19°27′10″E
- Country: Poland
- Voivodeship: Masovian
- County: Płock
- Gmina: Brudzeń Duży

Izabelin [izaˈbɛlin] is a village in the administrative district of Gmina Brudzeń Duży, within Płock County, Masovian Voivodeship, in east-central Poland.
