= Uniejewo =

- Village
- Location within Poland
- Coordinates: 52°37′N 19°28′E
- Country: Poland
- Voivodeship: Masovian
- County: Płock
- Gmina: Brudzeń Duży

Population
  - Total: 110
- Time zone: UTC+1 (CET)
  - Summer (DST): UTC+2 (CEST)
- Vehicle registration: WPL

Uniejewo [uɲɛˈjɛvɔ] is a village in the administrative district of Gmina Brudzeń Duży, within Płock County, Masovian Voivodeship, in central Poland.

Uniejewo was a private village, administratively located in the Dobrzyń County in the Inowrocław Voivodeship in the Greater Poland Province of the Kingdom of Poland.
