= Cierszewo =

- Village
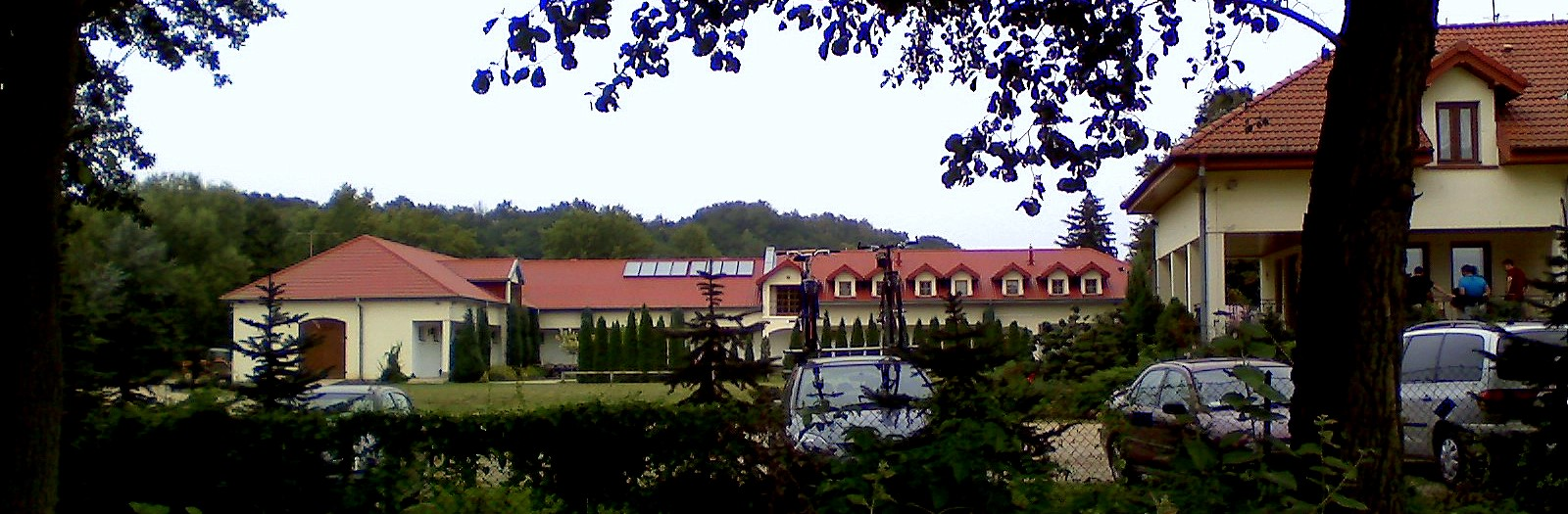

- Location within Poland
- Coordinates: 52°35′45″N 19°32′4″E
- Country: Poland
- Voivodeship: Masovian
- County: Płock
- Gmina: Brudzeń Duży
- Population: 21

Cierszewo [t͡ɕɛrˈʂɛvɔ] is a village in the administrative district of Gmina Brudzeń Duży, within Płock County, Masovian Voivodeship, in east-central Poland.

The village had a population of 21(last recorded in 2008).
