= Żerniki, Masovian Voivodeship =

Żerniki
- Village
- Location within Poland
- Coordinates: 52°38′2″N 19°31′4″E
- Country: Poland
- Voivodeship: Masovian
- County: Płock
- Gmina: Brudzeń Duży
- Population (approx.): 150

Żerniki (Polish pronunciation: [ʐɛrˈɲikʲi]) is a village in the administrative district of Gmina Brudzeń Duży, within Płock County, Masovian Voivodeship, in east-central Poland.
