= Gmina Brudzeń Duży =

Gmina Brudzeń Duży Brudzeń Duży Commune
- Gmina
- Location within Poland
- Coordinates: 52°40′0″N 19°30′0″E
- Country: Poland
- Voivodeship: Masovian
- County: Płock County
- Seat: Brudzeń Duży

Area
  - Total: 161.82 km^{2} (62.48 sq mi)

Population (2006)
  - Total: 7,806
  - Density: 48.24/km^{2} (124.9/sq mi)
- Time zone: UTC+1 (CET)
  - Summer (DST): UTC+2 (CEST)
- Vehicle registration: WPL
- Website: http://brudzen.pl/

Gmina Brudzeń Duży is a rural gmina (administrative district) in Płock County, Masovian Voivodeship, in central Poland. Its seat is the village of Brudzeń Duży, which lies approximately 19 kilometres (12 mi) north-west of Płock and 114 km (71 mi) north-west of Warsaw.

The gmina covers an area of 161.82 square kilometres (62.5 sq mi), and as of 2006 its total population is 7,806.

The gmina contains part of the protected area called Brudzeń Landscape Park.

== Villages ==
Gmina Brudzeń Duży contains the villages and settlements of Bądkowo Jeziorne, Bądkowo Kościelne, Bądkowo-Podlasie, Bądkowo-Rochny, Bądkowo-Rumunki, Biskupice, Brudzeń Duży, Brudzeń Mały, Cegielnia, Cierszewo, Główina, Gorzechowo, Izabelin, Janoszyce, Karwosieki-Cholewice, Karwosieki-Noskowice, Kłobukowo-Patrze, Krzyżanowo, Lasotki, Łukoszyno-Borki, Murzynowo, Myśliborzyce, Nowe Karwosieki, Parzeń, Parzeń-Janówek, Radotki, Rembielin, Robertowo, Rokicie, Siecień, Siecień Rumunki, Sobowo, Strupczewo Duże, Suchodół, Turza Mała, Turza Wielka, Uniejewo, Więcławice, Wincentowo, Winnica, Zdziembórz and Żerniki.

== Neighbouring gminas ==
Gmina Brudzeń Duży is bordered by the gminas of Dobrzyń nad Wisłą, Gozdowo, Mochowo, Nowy Duninów, Stara Biała, Tłuchowo and Włocławek.
