= Bądkowo Kościelne =

- Village
- Location within Poland
- Coordinates: 52°40′N 19°30′E
- Country: Poland
- Voivodeship: Masovian
- County: Płock
- Gmina: Brudzeń Duży
- Population: 192
- Website: http://ugbrudzenduzy.bip.org.pl/

Bądkowo Kościelne [bɔntˈkɔvɔ kɔɕˈt͡ɕɛlnɛ] is a village in the administrative district of Gmina Brudzeń Duży, within Płock County, Masovian Voivodeship, in east-central Poland.
