= Bądkowo-Rumunki =

- Village
- Location within Poland
- Coordinates: 52°40′55″N 19°26′59″E
- Country: Poland
- Voivodeship: Masovian
- County: Płock
- Gmina: Brudzeń Duży
- Population: 60

Bądkowo-Rumunki [bɔntˈkɔvɔ ruˈmunki] is a village in the administrative district of Gmina Brudzeń Duży, within Płock County, Masovian Voivodeship, in east-central Poland.
