= Okalewka =

Location
- Country: Poland

Physical characteristics
- Mouth
  - location: Skrwa Prawa
  - coordinates: 53.0281°N 19.6431°E

Basin features
- Progression: Skrwa Prawa→ Vistula→ Baltic Sea

The Okalewka is a river of Poland, and a tributary of the Skrwa Prawa near Skrwilno.
