= Murzynowo, Masovian Voivodeship =

Murzynowo
- Village
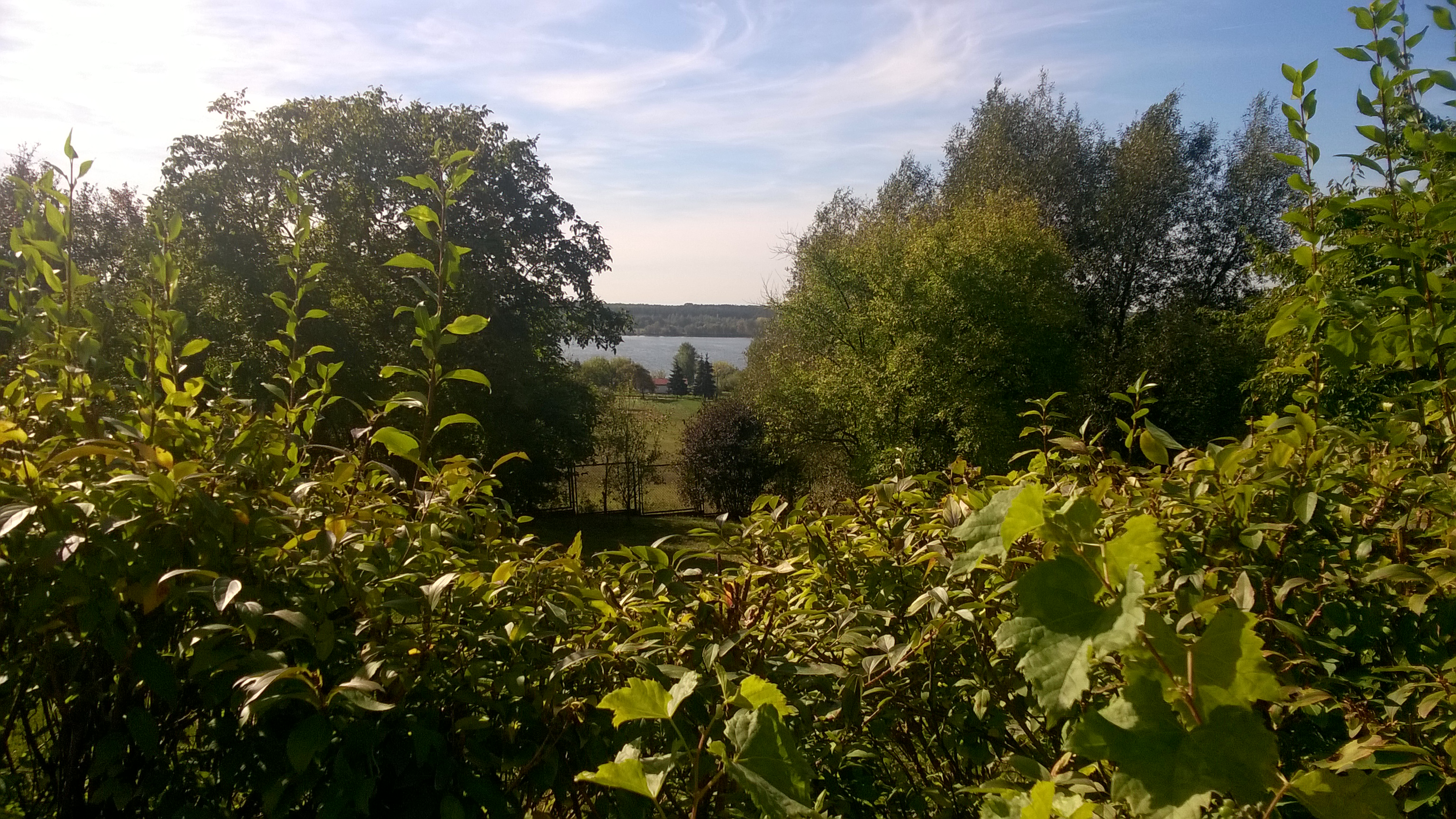

- Location within Poland
- Coordinates: 52°35′9″N 19°30′27″E
- Country: Poland
- Voivodeship: Masovian
- County: Płock
- Gmina: Brudzeń Duży

Population
  - Total: 163
- Time zone: UTC+1 (CET)
  - Summer (DST): UTC+2 (CEST)
- Vehicle registration: WPL

Murzynowo [muʐɨˈnɔvɔ] is a village in the administrative district of Gmina Brudzeń Duży, within Płock County, Masovian Voivodeship, in central Poland.

Murzynowo was a private village, administratively located in the Dobrzyń County in the Inowrocław Voivodeship in the Greater Poland Province of the Kingdom of Poland.
