= Skrwa Prawa =

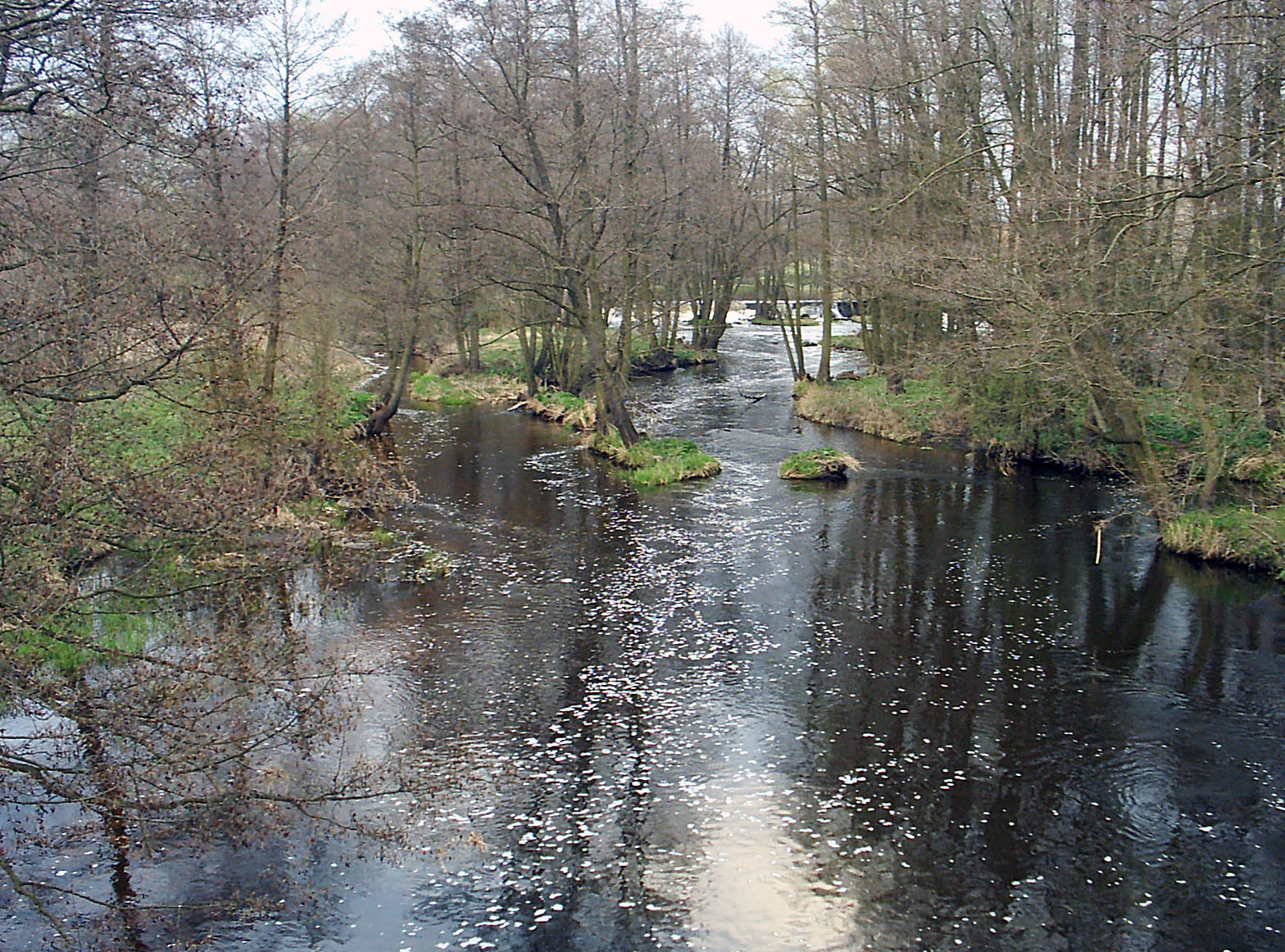

Location
- Country: Poland

Physical characteristics
- Source
  - location: southeast of Zdrojki-Piegowo, Żuromin County, Masovian Voivodeship
  - coordinates: 53°05′45″N 19°41′47″E
- Mouth: Vistula
  - location: Biskupice, Płock County, Masovian Voivodeship
  - coordinates: 52°34′51″N 19°31′58″E
  - elevation: 53 m (174 ft)
- Length: 114 km (71 mi)
- Basin size: 1,704 km^{2} (658 mi^{2})
- Discharge
  - average: 6 m^{3}/s (210 cu ft/s)

Basin features
- Progression: Vistula→ Baltic Sea
- Tributaries
  - left: Chraponianka; Sierpienica
  - right: Bobrownica; Okalewka; Urszulewka

The Skrwa Prawa (Right Skrwa; in Polish also Skrwa, Skrwa Północna, or Płosznica) is a river of Poland, and a right tributary of the Vistula. The Skrwa has a length of 113.9 km. Its own tributaries include the Okalewka, the Urszulewka, the Chraponianka, the Sierpienica, and the Bobrownica.

Its shorter counterpart, the Skrwa Lewa (Left Skrwa) joins the Vistula about three miles upstream on the opposite bank.
