= Suchodół, Płock County =

Suchodół
- Village
- Location within Poland
- Coordinates: 52°39′27″N 19°35′24″E
- Country: Poland
- Voivodeship: Masovian
- County: Płock
- Gmina: Brudzeń Duży
- Time zone: UTC+1 (CET)
  - Summer (DST): UTC+2 (CEST)

Suchodół (Polish pronunciation: [suˈxɔduw]) is a village in the administrative district of Gmina Brudzeń Duży, within Płock County, Masovian Voivodeship, in central Poland.
