= Turza Wielka, Płock County =

Turza Wielka
- Village
- Location within Poland
- Coordinates: 52°41′53″N 19°27′29″E
- Country: Poland
- Voivodeship: Masovian
- County: Płock
- Gmina: Brudzeń Duży

Turza Wielka [ˈtuʐa ˈvjɛlka] is a village in the administrative district of Gmina Brudzeń Duży, within Płock County, Masovian Voivodeship, in east-central Poland.
