= Strupczewo Duże =

- Village
- Location within Poland
- Coordinates: 52°39′N 19°28′E
- Country: Poland
- Voivodeship: Masovian
- County: Płock
- Gmina: Brudzeń Duży

Strupczewo Duże [strupˈt͡ʂɛvɔ ˈduʐɛ] is a village in the administrative district of Gmina Brudzeń Duży, within Płock County, Masovian Voivodeship, in east-central Poland.
