= Janoszyce =

- Village
- Location within Poland
- Coordinates: 52°40′33″N 19°31′52″E
- Country: Poland
- Voivodeship: Masovian
- County: Płock
- Gmina: Brudzeń Duży

Janoszyce [janɔˈʂɨt͡sɛ] is a village in the administrative district of Gmina Brudzeń Duży, within Płock County, Masovian Voivodeship, in east-central Poland.
