= Winnica =

Winnica (meaning "vineyard" in Polish) may refer to the following places: see Winnica Zbrodzice

- Winnica, Lower Silesian Voivodeship (south-west Poland)
- Winnica, Świętokrzyskie Voivodeship (south-central Poland)
- Winnica, Płock County in Masovian Voivodeship (east-central Poland)
- Winnica, Pułtusk County in Masovian Voivodeship (east-central Poland)
- Vinnytsia, a city in central Ukraine
