= Karwosieki-Noskowice =

- Village
- Location within Poland
- Coordinates: 52°40′17″N 19°34′0″E
- Country: Poland
- Voivodeship: Masovian
- County: Płock
- Gmina: Brudzeń Duży

Karwosieki-Noskowice [karvɔˈɕɛki nɔskɔˈvit͡sɛ] is a village in the administrative district of Gmina Brudzeń Duży, within Płock County, Masovian Voivodeship, in east-central Poland.
