= Myśliborzyce, Masovian Voivodeship =

Myśliborzyce
- Village
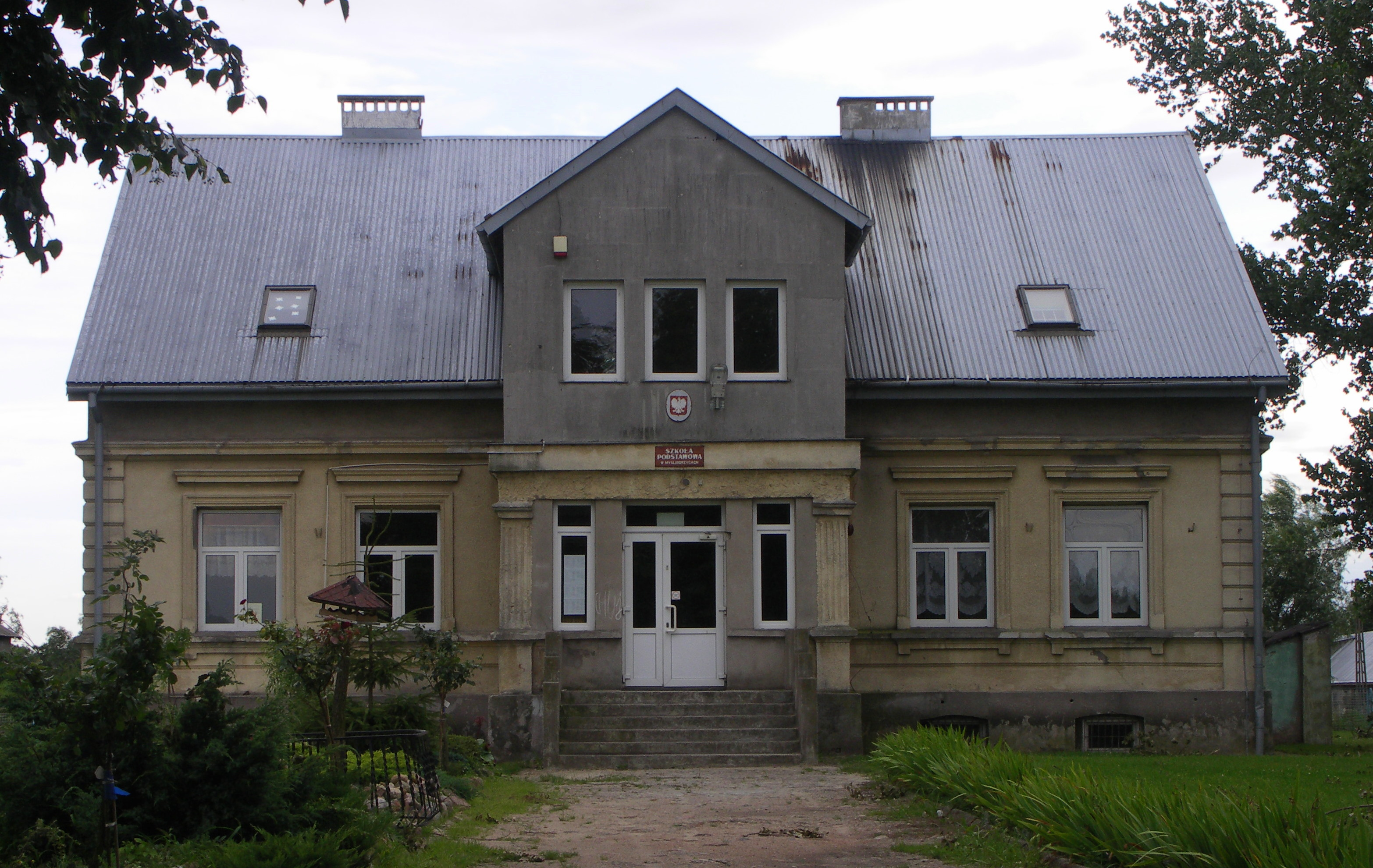
- Elementary school in Myśliborzyce

- Location within Poland
- Coordinates: 52°37′22″N 19°27′7″E
- Country: Poland
- Voivodeship: Masovian
- County: Płock
- Gmina: Brudzeń Duży
- Time zone: UTC+1 (CET)
  - Summer (DST): UTC+2 (CEST)
- Vehicle registration: WPL

Myśliborzyce [mɨɕlibɔˈʐɨt͡sɛ] is a village in the administrative district of Gmina Brudzeń Duży, within Płock County, Masovian Voivodeship, in central Poland.

Myśliborzyce was a private village, administratively located in the Dobrzyń County in the Inowrocław Voivodeship in the Greater Poland Province of the Kingdom of Poland.
