= Pianki, Masovian Voivodeship =

Pianki
- Village
- Location within Poland
- Coordinates: 52°56′31″N 19°43′20″E
- Country: Poland
- Voivodeship: Masovian
- County: Sierpc
- Gmina: Rościszewo
- Time zone: UTC+1 (CET)
  - Summer (DST): UTC+2 (CEST)
- Vehicle registration: WSE

Pianki [ˈpjaŋki] is a village in the administrative district of Gmina Rościszewo, within Sierpc County, Masovian Voivodeship, in north-central Poland.
