= Winnica, Płock County =

Winnica
- Village
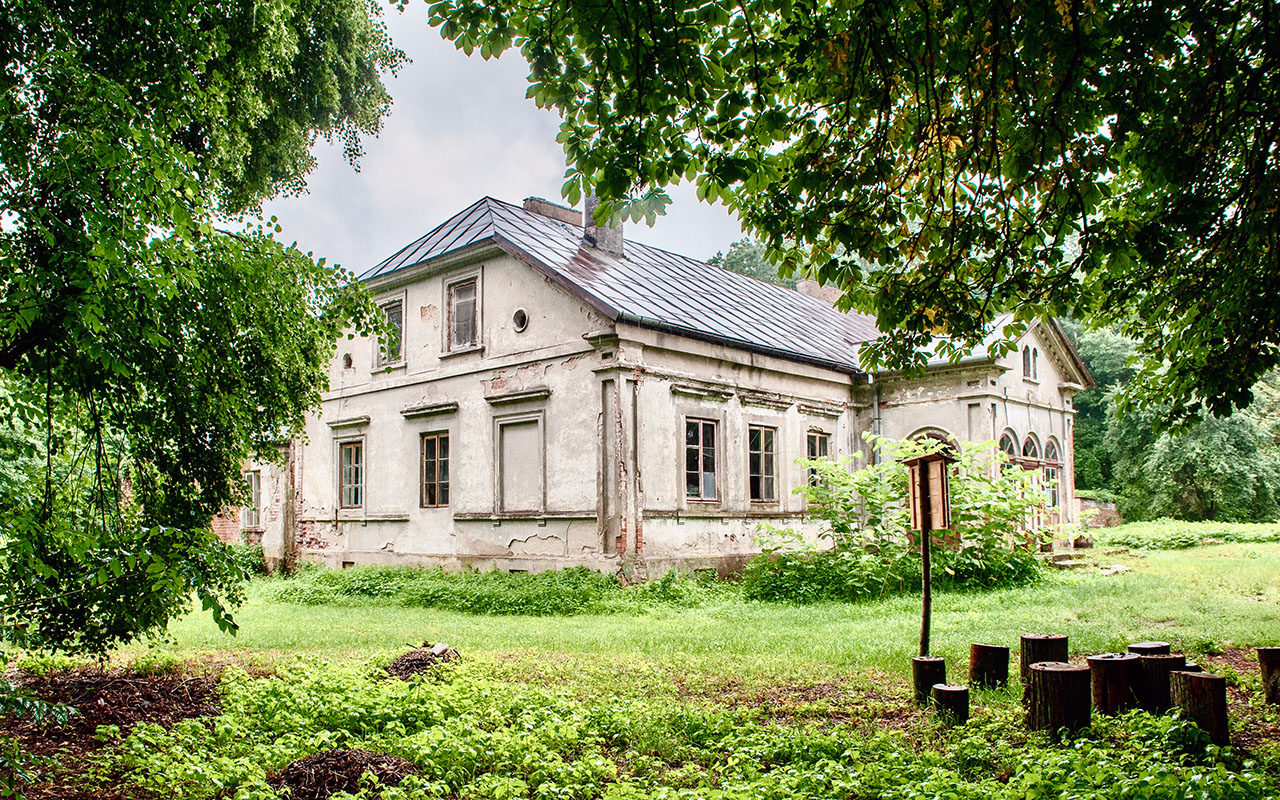
- Historic manor house in Winnica

- Location within Poland
- Coordinates: 52°41′6″N 19°30′37″E
- Country: Poland
- Voivodeship: Masovian
- County: Płock
- Gmina: Brudzeń Duży
- Time zone: UTC+1 (CET)
  - Summer (DST): UTC+2 (CEST)
- Postal code: 09-414
- Vehicle registration: WPL

Winnica [vinˈnit͡sa] is a village in the administrative district of Gmina Brudzeń Duży, within Płock County, Masovian Voivodeship, in central Poland.
