= Słupia, Gmina Szczutowo =

Słupia
- Village
- Location within Poland
- Coordinates: 52°58′01″N 19°53′37″E
- Country: Poland
- Voivodeship: Masovian
- County: Sierpc
- Gmina: Szczutowo

Słupia [ˈswupja] is a village in the administrative district of Gmina Szczutowo, within Sierpc County, Masovian Voivodeship, in east-central Poland.
