= Biskupice, Gmina Brudzeń Duży =

Biskupice
- Village
- Location within Poland
- Coordinates: 52°34′35″N 19°32′56″E
- Country: Poland
- Voivodeship: Masovian
- County: Płock
- Gmina: Brudzeń Duży

Biskupice [biskuˈpit͡sɛ] is a village in the administrative district of Gmina Brudzeń Duży, within Płock County, Masovian Voivodeship, in east-central Poland.
