= Brudzeń Landscape Park =

Protected area in Poland

Coordinates: 52°37′N 19°33′E

- Brudzeński Park Krajobrazowy
- IUCN category V (protected landscape/seascape)
- Interactive map of Brudzeń Landscape Park
- Location: Masovian Voivodeship
- Area: 34.52 km^{2} (13.33 sq mi)
- Established: 1988

Brudzeń Landscape Park (Brudzeński Park Krajobrazowy) is a protected area (Landscape Park) in east-central Poland, established in 1988, covering an area of 34.52 square kilometres (13.33 sq mi).

The Park lies within Masovian Voivodeship, in Płock County (Gmina Brudzeń Duży, Gmina Stara Biała).

Within the Landscape Park are three nature reserves, the 216 hectare Sikórz Nature Reserve, the 39 hectare Rezerwat przyrody Brudzeńskie Jary and the 66 hectare Brwilno nature reserve which features a 6 mile forest trail loop.
