= Turza Mała, Płock County =

Turza Mała
- Village
- Location within Poland
- Coordinates: 52°41′37″N 19°28′24″E
- Country: Poland
- Voivodeship: Masovian
- County: Płock
- Gmina: Brudzeń Duży

Turza Mała [ˈtuʐa ˈmawa] is a village that is located in the administrative district of Gmina Brudzeń Duży, within Płock County, Masovian Voivodeship, in east-central Poland.
