= Borowiec, Choszczno County =

Borowiec
- Village
- Location within Poland
- Coordinates: 53°11′38″N 15°45′5″E
- Country: Poland
- Voivodeship: West Pomeranian
- County: Choszczno
- Gmina: Drawno

Population
  - Total: 40
- Time zone: UTC+1 (CET)
  - Summer (DST): UTC+2 (CEST)
- Postal code: 73-220
- Area code: +48 95
- Car plates: ZCH

Borowiec [bɔˈrɔvjɛt͡s] is a village in the administrative district of Gmina Drawno, within Choszczno County, West Pomeranian Voivodeship, in north-western Poland. It lies approximately 3 km (2 mi) south of Drawno, 24 km (15 mi) east of Choszczno, and 82 km (51 mi) east of the regional capital Szczecin.
