= Borki, West Pomeranian Voivodeship =

Borki
- Village
- Location within Poland
- Coordinates: 53°13′12″N 15°43′28″E
- Country: Poland
- Voivodeship: West Pomeranian
- County: Choszczno
- Gmina: Drawno
- Time zone: UTC+1 (CET)
  - Summer (DST): UTC+2 (CEST)
- Area code: +48 95
- Car plates: ZCH

Borki [ˈbɔrki] (German: Neumannswalde) is a village in the administrative district of Gmina Drawno, within Choszczno County, West Pomeranian Voivodeship, in north-western Poland. It lies approximately 2 km (1 mi) west of Drawno, 23 km (14 mi) east of Choszczno, and 79 km (49 mi) east of the regional capital Szczecin.

== See also ==
- History of Pomerania
