= Samborz, West Pomeranian Voivodeship =

Samborz
- Village
- Location within Poland
- Coordinates: 53°14′35″N 15°43′55″E
- Country: Poland
- Voivodeship: West Pomeranian
- County: Choszczno
- Gmina: Drawno
- Time zone: UTC+1 (CET)
  - Summer (DST): UTC+2 (CEST)
- Postal code: 73-220
- Area code: +48 95
- Car plates: ZCH

Samborz [ˈsambɔʂ] (German: Johanneshof) is a village in the administrative district of Gmina Drawno, within Choszczno County, West Pomeranian Voivodeship, in north-western Poland. It lies approximately 4 km (2 mi) north of Drawno, 24 km (15 mi) east of Choszczno, and 79 km (49 mi) east of the regional capital Szczecin.
