= Żółwinko =

- Village
- Location within Poland
- Coordinates: 53°7′55″N 15°46′12″E
- Country: Poland
- Voivodeship: West Pomeranian
- County: Choszczno
- Gmina: Drawno
- Time zone: UTC+1 (CET)
  - Summer (DST): UTC+2 (CEST)
- Area code: +48 95
- Car plates: ZCH

Żółwinko [ʐuu̯ˈvinkɔ] (German: Forsthaus Salvin) is a village in the administrative district of Gmina Drawno, within Choszczno County, West Pomeranian Voivodeship, in north-western Poland. It lies approximately 10 km (6 mi) south of Drawno, 26 km (16 mi) east of Choszczno, and 86 km (53 mi) east of the regional capital Szczecin.

Between 1871 and 1945 the area was part of Germany.
