= Barnimie =

- Village
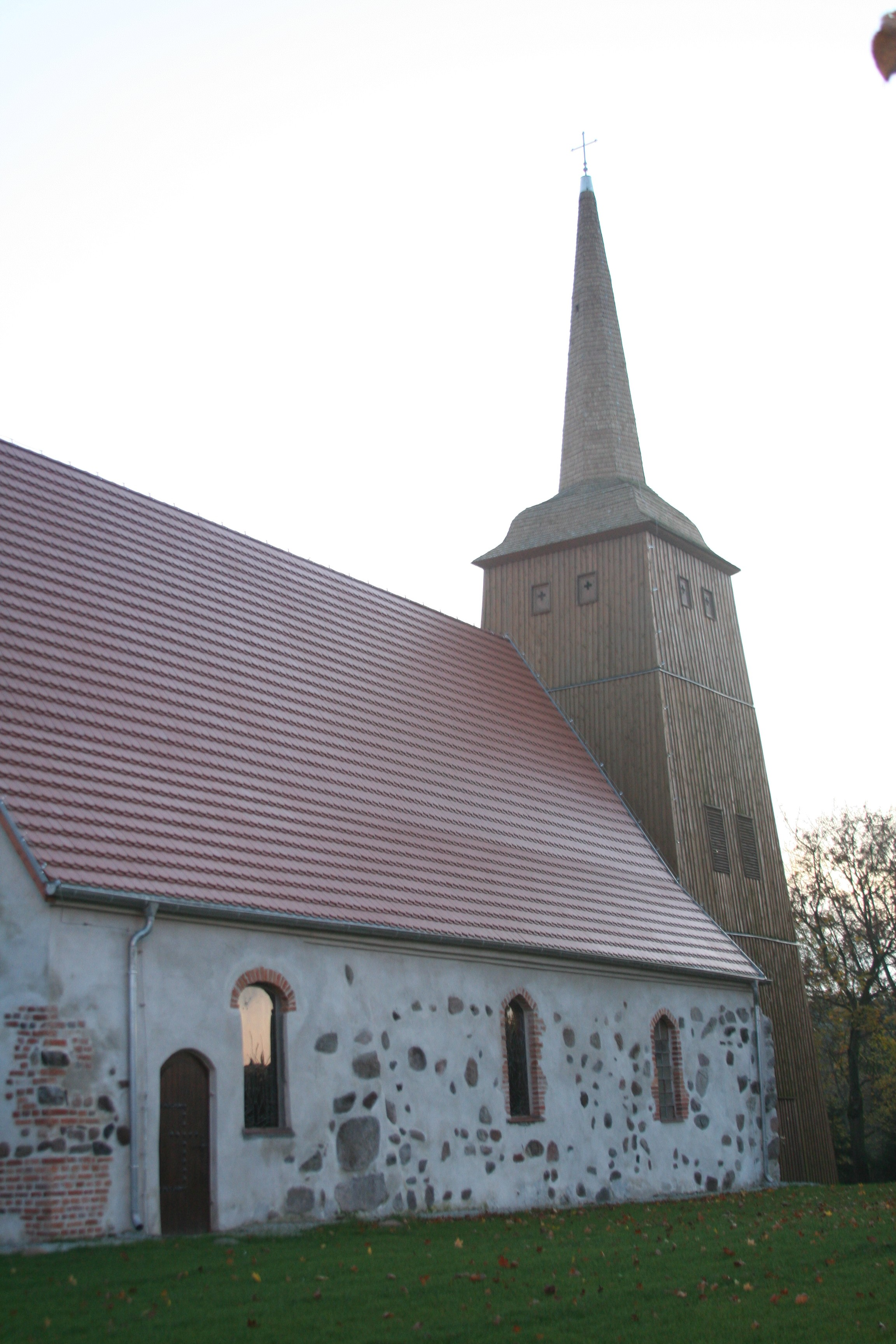
- Sacred Heart church in Barnimie

- Location within Poland
- Coordinates: 53°10′N 15°48′E
- Country: Poland
- Voivodeship: West Pomeranian
- County: Choszczno
- Gmina: Drawno
- Population: 310
- Time zone: UTC+1 (CET)
  - Summer (DST): UTC+2 (CEST)
- Area code: +48 95
- Car plates: ZCH

Barnimie [barˈnimjɛ] (German: Fürstenau) is a village in the administrative district of Gmina Drawno, within Choszczno County, West Pomeranian Voivodeship, in north-western Poland. It lies approximately 7 km (4 mi) south-east of Drawno, 27 km (17 mi) east of Choszczno, and 86 km (53 mi) east of the regional capital Szczecin.

The village has a population of 310.

The historic Sacred Heart church, dating back to the 15th century, is located in Barnimie.
