= Bogdanka, West Pomeranian Voivodeship =

Bogdanka
- Village
- Location within Poland
- Coordinates: 53°8′46″N 15°52′40″E
- Country: Poland
- Voivodeship: West Pomeranian
- County: Choszczno
- Gmina: Drawno
- Time zone: UTC+1 (CET)
  - Summer (DST): UTC+2 (CEST)
- Area code: +48 95
- Car plates: ZCH

Bogdanka [bɔɡˈdanka] is a village in the administrative district of Gmina Drawno, within Choszczno County, West Pomeranian Voivodeship, in north-western Poland. It lies approximately 12 km (7 mi) south-east of Drawno, 32 km (20 mi) east of Choszczno, and 92 km (57 mi) east of the regional capital Szczecin.

== See also ==
- History of Pomerania
