= Karpinek =

- Village
- Location within Poland
- Coordinates: 53°9′47″N 15°41′9″E
- Country: Poland
- Voivodeship: West Pomeranian
- County: Choszczno
- Gmina: Drawno
- Time zone: UTC+1 (CET)
  - Summer (DST): UTC+2 (CEST)
- Area code: +48 95
- Car plates: ZCH

Karpinek [karˈpinɛk] (German: Krug) is a village in the administrative district of Gmina Drawno, within Choszczno County, West Pomeranian Voivodeship, in north-western Poland. It lies approximately 8 km (5 mi) south-west of Drawno, 20 km (12 mi) east of Choszczno, and 79 km (49 mi) east of the regional capital Szczecin.
