= Dominikowo =

- Village
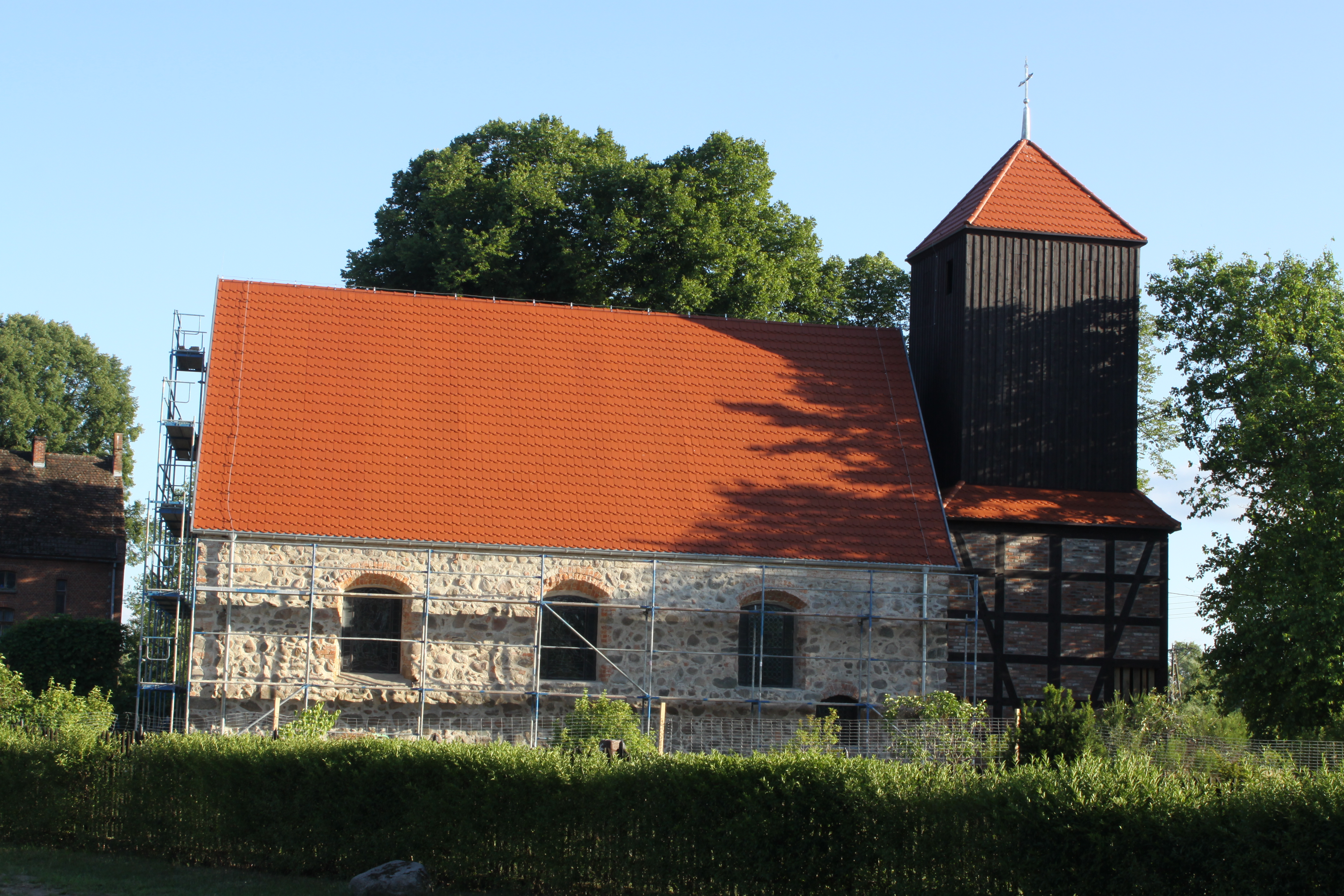
- Church of the Assumption in Dominikowo

- Location within Poland
- Coordinates: 53°12′N 15°50′E
- Country: Poland
- Voivodeship: West Pomeranian
- County: Choszczno
- Gmina: Drawno
- Population (2007): 243
- Time zone: UTC+1 (CET)
  - Summer (DST): UTC+2 (CEST)
- Area code: +48 95
- Car plates: ZCH

Dominikowo [dɔminiˈkɔvɔ] (German: Mienken) is a village in the administrative district of Gmina Drawno, within Choszczno County, West Pomeranian Voivodeship, in north-western Poland. It lies approximately 6 km (4 mi) east of Drawno, 30 km (19 mi) east of Choszczno, and 87 km (54 mi) east of the regional capital Szczecin.

The historic Church of the Assumption, dating back to the 16th century, is located in the village.
