= Dolina, West Pomeranian Voivodeship =

Dolina
- Village
- Location within Poland
- Coordinates: 53°12′36″N 15°46′34″E
- Country: Poland
- Voivodeship: West Pomeranian
- County: Choszczno
- Gmina: Drawno
- Population (2007): 23
- Time zone: UTC+1 (CET)
  - Summer (DST): UTC+2 (CEST)
- Area code: +48 95
- Car plates: ZCH

Dolina [dɔˈlina] (German: Wiesenthal) is a village in the administrative district of Gmina Drawno, within Choszczno County, West Pomeranian Voivodeship, in north-western Poland. It lies approximately 2 km (1 mi) south-east of Drawno, 26 km (16 mi) east of Choszczno, and 83 km (52 mi) east of the regional capital Szczecin.
