= Zdanów, West Pomeranian Voivodeship =

Zdanów
- Village
- Location within Poland
- Coordinates: 53°13′N 15°43′E
- Country: Poland
- Voivodeship: West Pomeranian
- County: Choszczno
- Gmina: Drawno
- Population: 40
- Time zone: UTC+1 (CET)
  - Summer (DST): UTC+2 (CEST)
- Area code: +48 95
- Car plates: ZCH

Zdanów [ˈzdanuf] (German: Zankhof) is a village in the administrative district of Gmina Drawno, within Choszczno County, West Pomeranian Voivodeship, in north-western Poland. It lies approximately 3 km (2 mi) west of Drawno, 22 km (14 mi) east of Choszczno, and 79 km (49 mi) east of the regional capital Szczecin.

The village has a population of 40.
