= Brzeziny, West Pomeranian Voivodeship =

Brzeziny
- Village
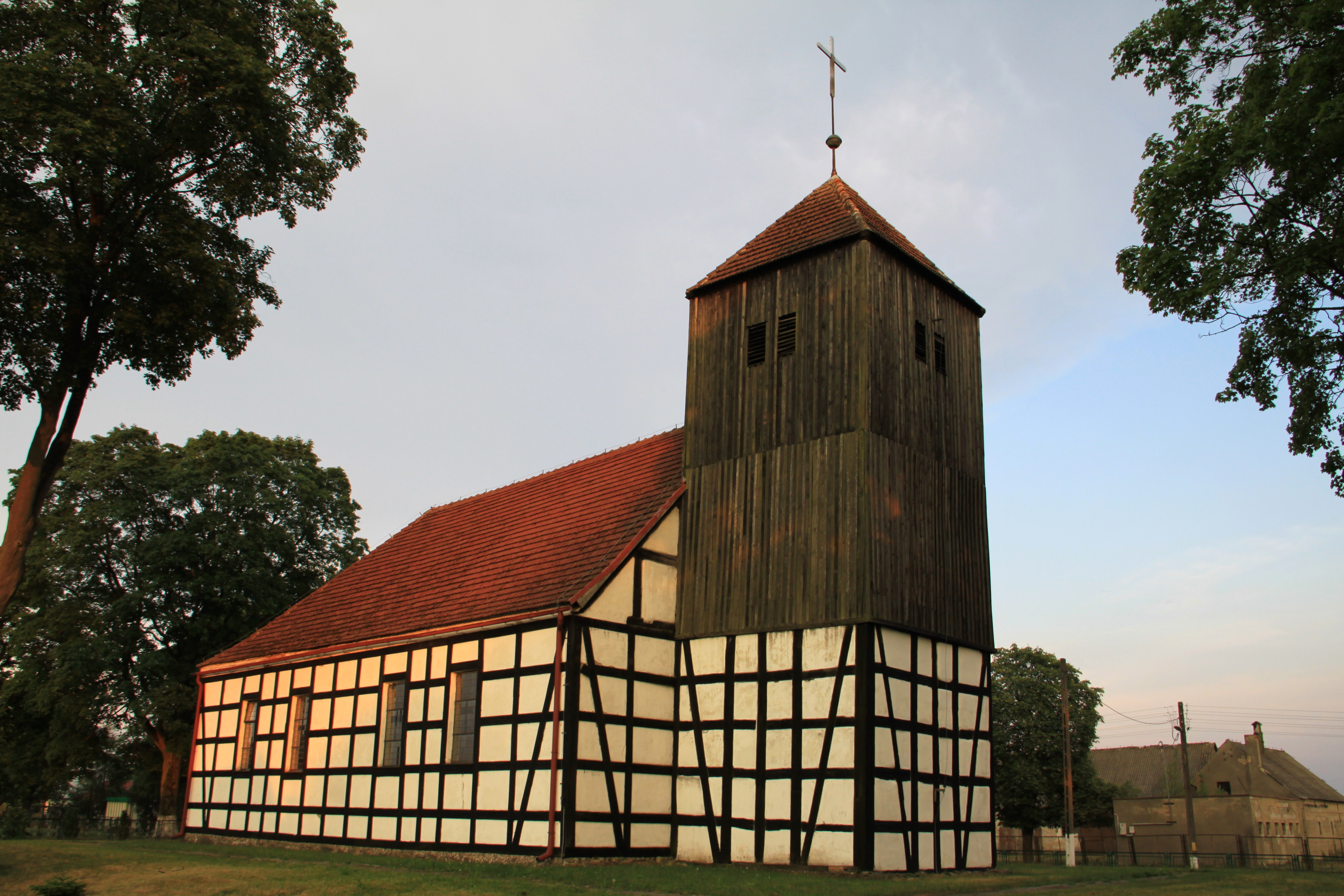
- Church of the Visitation in Brzeziny

- Location within Poland
- Coordinates: 53°8′44″N 15°41′1″E
- Country: Poland
- Voivodeship: West Pomeranian
- County: Choszczno
- Gmina: Drawno
- Time zone: UTC+1 (CET)
  - Summer (DST): UTC+2 (CEST)
- Area code: +48 95
- Car plates: ZCH

Brzeziny [bʐɛˈʑinɨ] (German: Berkenbrügge) is a village in the administrative district of Gmina Drawno, within Choszczno County, West Pomeranian Voivodeship, in north-western Poland. It lies approximately 10 km (6 mi) south-west of Drawno, 20 km (12 mi) east of Choszczno, and 80 km (50 mi) east of the regional capital Szczecin.

In the village there is a historic half-timbered church of the Visitation.
