= Karpin, Choszczno County =

Karpin
- Village
- Location within Poland
- Coordinates: 53°10′N 15°40′E
- Country: Poland
- Voivodeship: West Pomeranian
- County: Choszczno
- Gmina: Drawno
- Population: 10
- Time zone: UTC+1 (CET)
  - Summer (DST): UTC+2 (CEST)
- Area code: +48 95
- Car plates: ZCH

Karpin [ˈkarpin] (German: Mürbenfelde) is a village in the administrative district of Gmina Drawno, within Choszczno County, West Pomeranian Voivodeship, in north-western Poland. It lies approximately 8 km (5 mi) south-west of Drawno, 18 km (11 mi) east of Choszczno, and 78 km (48 mi) east of the regional capital Szczecin.

The village has a population of 10.
