= Nowa Korytnica =

- Village
- Location within Poland
- Coordinates: 53°12′27″N 15°58′19″E
- Country: Poland
- Voivodeship: West Pomeranian
- County: Choszczno
- Gmina: Drawno
- Time zone: UTC+1 (CET)
  - Summer (DST): UTC+2 (CEST)
- Area code: +48 95
- Car plates: ZCH

Nowa Korytnica [ˈnɔva kɔrɨtˈnit͡sa] is a village in the administrative district of Gmina Drawno, within Choszczno County, West Pomeranian Voivodeship, in north-western Poland. It lies approximately 15 km (9 mi) east of Drawno, 39 km (24 mi) east of Choszczno, and 96 km (60 mi) east of the regional capital Szczecin.

Before 1945 the village was German-settled and part of the German state of Prussia.
