= Zatom =

- Village
- Location within Poland
- Coordinates: 53°8′N 15°50′E
- Country: Poland
- Voivodeship: West Pomeranian
- County: Choszczno
- Gmina: Drawno
- Time zone: UTC+1 (CET)
  - Summer (DST): UTC+2 (CEST)
- Area code: +48 95
- Car plates: ZCH

Zatom [ˈzatɔm] (German: Zatten) is a village in the administrative district of Gmina Drawno, within Choszczno County, West Pomeranian Voivodeship, in north-western Poland. It lies approximately 11 km (7 mi) south-east of Drawno, 30 km (19 mi) east of Choszczno, and 89 km (55 mi) east of the regional capital Szczecin.

A Catholic church is located in the village.

Before 1945 the village was German-settled and part of the German state of Prussia.
