= Podegrodzie, West Pomeranian Voivodeship =

Podegrodzie
- Village
- Location within Poland
- Coordinates: 53°11′38″N 15°47′20″E
- Country: Poland
- Voivodeship: West Pomeranian
- County: Choszczno
- Gmina: Drawno
- Time zone: UTC+1 (CET)
  - Summer (DST): UTC+2 (CEST)
- Area code: +48 95
- Car plates: ZCH

Podegrodzie [pɔdɛˈɡrɔd͡ʑɛ] is a village in the administrative district of Gmina Drawno, within Choszczno County, West Pomeranian Voivodeship, in north-western Poland. It lies approximately 4 km (2 mi) south-east of Drawno, 27 km (17 mi) east of Choszczno, and 84 km (52 mi) east of the regional capital Szczecin.
