= Święciechów =

- Village
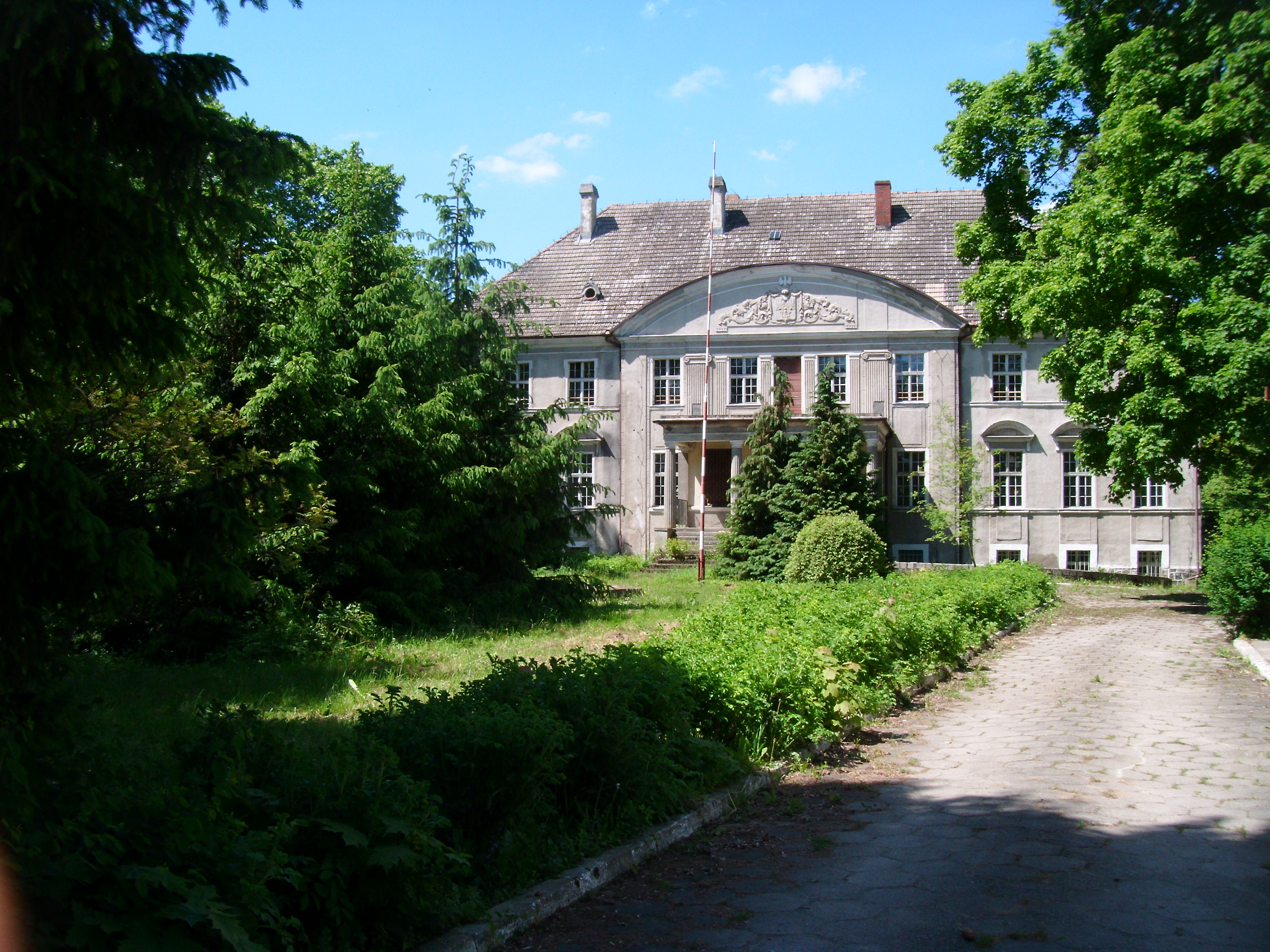
- Palace in Święciechów

- Location within Poland
- Coordinates: 53°15′14″N 15°42′47″E
- Country: Poland
- Voivodeship: West Pomeranian
- County: Choszczno
- Gmina: Drawno
- Time zone: UTC+1 (CET)
  - Summer (DST): UTC+2 (CEST)
- Area code: +48 95
- Car plates: ZCH

Święciechów (Polish: [ɕfjɛɲˈt͡ɕɛxuf]; German: Silberberg) is a village in the administrative district of Gmina Drawno, within Choszczno County, West Pomeranian Voivodeship, in northwest Poland. It lies approximately 5 km (3 mi) north-west of Drawno, 24 km (15 mi) north-east of Choszczno, and 78 km (48 mi) east of the regional capital Szczecin.

A palace, a park and a historic church of Our Lady of Częstochowa are located in the village.

For the history of the region, see History of Pomerania.
