= Żółwino, Choszczno County =

Żółwino
- Village
- Location within Poland
- Coordinates: 53°17′N 15°41′E
- Country: Poland
- Voivodeship: West Pomeranian
- County: Choszczno
- Gmina: Drawno
- Population: 110
- Time zone: UTC+1 (CET)
  - Summer (DST): UTC+2 (CEST)
- Area code: +48 95
- Car plates: ZCH

Żółwino [ʐuu̯ˈvinɔ] (German: Hassendorf) is a village in the administrative district of Gmina Drawno, within Choszczno County, West Pomeranian Voivodeship, in north-western Poland. It lies approximately 9 km (6 mi) north-west of Drawno, 23 km (14 mi) north-east of Choszczno, and 75 km (47 mi) east of the regional capital Szczecin.

The village has a population of 110.

A Catholic church and a railway station are located in the village.

Before 1945 the village was German-settled and part of the German state of Prussia. The original German name of the village most likely refers to settlers from Hesse who founded the settlement.
