= Drawnik =

- Village
- Location within Poland
- Coordinates: 53°12′10″N 15°45′41″E
- Country: Poland
- Voivodeship: West Pomeranian
- County: Choszczno
- Gmina: Drawno
- Time zone: UTC+1 (CET)
  - Summer (DST): UTC+2 (CEST)
- Area code: +48 95
- Car plates: ZCH

Drawnik [ˈdravnik] (German: Dragemühle) is a village in the administrative district of Gmina Drawno, within Choszczno County, West Pomeranian Voivodeship, in north-western Poland. It lies approximately 2 km (1 mi) south-east of Drawno, 25 km (16 mi) east of Choszczno, and 82 km (51 mi) east of the regional capital Szczecin.
