= Międzybór =

- Village
- Location within Poland
- Coordinates: 53°9′18″N 15°52′5″E
- Country: Poland
- Voivodeship: West Pomeranian
- County: Choszczno
- Gmina: Drawno
- Time zone: UTC+1 (CET)
  - Summer (DST): UTC+2 (CEST)
- Area code: +48 95
- Car plates: ZCH

Międzybór [mjɛnˈd͡zɨbur] is a village in the administrative district of Gmina Drawno, within Choszczno County, West Pomeranian Voivodeship, in north-western Poland. It lies approximately 11 km (7 mi) south-east of Drawno, 32 km (20 mi) east of Choszczno, and 91 km (57 mi) east of the regional capital Szczecin.
