= Gack =

- Village
- Location within Poland
- Coordinates: 53°8′46″N 15°43′4″E
- Country: Poland
- Voivodeship: West Pomeranian
- County: Choszczno
- Gmina: Drawno
- Time zone: UTC+1 (CET)
  - Summer (DST): UTC+2 (CEST)
- Area code: +48 95
- Car plates: ZCH

Gack (Polish: [ɡat͡sk]; German: Kolonie Berkenbrügge) is a village in the administrative district of Gmina Drawno, within Choszczno County, West Pomeranian Voivodeship, in north-western Poland. It lies approximately 9 km (6 mi) south of Drawno, 22 km (14 mi) east of Choszczno, and 82 km (51 mi) east of the regional capital Szczecin.

Before 1945 the village was German-settled and part of the German state of Prussia.
