= Rościn, Choszczno County =

Rościn
- Village
- Location within Poland
- Coordinates: 53°16′12″N 15°46′27″E
- Country: Poland
- Voivodeship: West Pomeranian
- County: Choszczno
- Gmina: Drawno
- Time zone: UTC+1 (CET)
  - Summer (DST): UTC+2 (CEST)
- Area code: +48 95
- Car plates: ZCH

Rościn [ˈrɔɕt͡ɕin] (German: Röstenberg) is a village in the administrative district of Gmina Drawno, within Choszczno County, West Pomeranian Voivodeship, in north-western Poland. It lies approximately 7 km (4 mi) north of Drawno, 28 km (17 mi) north-east of Choszczno, and 81 km (50 mi) east of the regional capital Szczecin.
