= Kostrzewa =

Kostrzewa may refer to:

- Kostrzewa, Choszczno County, village in West Pomeranian Voivodeship, Poland
- Kostrzewa, Koszalin County, settlement in West Pomeranian Voivodeship, Poland
- Kostrzewa (surname)
