= Rogoźnica =

Rogoźnica may refer to the following places in Poland:

- Rogoźnica, Lower Silesian Voivodeship (south-west Poland)
- Rogoźnica, Lublin Voivodeship (east Poland)
- Rogoźnica, Subcarpathian Voivodeship (south-east Poland)
- Rogoźnica, West Pomeranian Voivodeship (north-west Poland)
