= Rogoźnica, West Pomeranian Voivodeship =

Rogoźnica
- Village
- Location within Poland
- Coordinates: 53°7′18″N 15°57′25″E
- Country: Poland
- Voivodeship: West Pomeranian
- County: Choszczno
- Gmina: Drawno
- Time zone: UTC+1 (CET)
  - Summer (DST): UTC+2 (CEST)
- Area code: +48 95
- Car plates: ZCH

Rogoźnica [rɔɡɔʑˈnit͡sa] (German: Räumde) is a village in the administrative district of Gmina Drawno, within Choszczno County, West Pomeranian Voivodeship, in north-western Poland. It lies approximately 18 km (11 mi) south-east of Drawno, 38 km (24 mi) east of Choszczno, and 98 km (61 mi) east of the regional capital Szczecin.
