= Kostrzewa, Choszczno County =

Kostrzewa
- Village
- Location within Poland
- Coordinates: 53°10′12″N 15°39′0″E
- Country: Poland
- Voivodeship: West Pomeranian
- County: Choszczno
- Gmina: Drawno
- Time zone: UTC+1 (CET)
  - Summer (DST): UTC+2 (CEST)
- Area code: +48 95
- Car plates: ZCH

Kostrzewa [kɔsˈtʂɛva] (German: Jakobsdorf) is a village in the administrative district of Gmina Drawno, within Choszczno County, West Pomeranian Voivodeship, in north-western Poland. It lies approximately 9 km (6 mi) south-west of Drawno, 17 km (11 mi) east of Choszczno, and 77 km (48 mi) east of the regional capital Szczecin.
