= Konotop, Choszczno County =

Konotop
- Village
- Location within Poland
- Coordinates: 53°9′13″N 15°50′27″E
- Country: Poland
- Voivodeship: West Pomeranian
- County: Choszczno
- Gmina: Drawno
- Time zone: UTC+1 (CET)
  - Summer (DST): UTC+2 (CEST)
- Area code: +48 95
- Car plates: ZCH

Konotop [kɔˈnɔtɔp] (German: Friedenau) is a village in the administrative district of Gmina Drawno, within Choszczno County, West Pomeranian Voivodeship, in north-western Poland. It lies approximately 10 km (6 mi) south-east of Drawno, 30 km (19 mi) east of Choszczno, and 89 km (55 mi) east of the regional capital Szczecin.
