= Sówka, West Pomeranian Voivodeship =

Sówka
- Hamlet
- Location within Poland
- Coordinates: 53°09′38″N 15°54′36″E
- Country: Poland
- Voivodeship: West Pomeranian
- County: Choszczno
- Municipality: Drawno
- Time zone: UTC+1 (CET)
  - Summer (DST): UTC+2 (CEST)
- Postal code: 73-220
- Area code: +48 95

Sówka (Polish: [ˈsuf.ka]) is a hamlet in the West Pomeranian Voivodeship, Poland, located within the municipality of Drawno in Kamień County. It was established in 2012.
