= Kiełpino, Choszczno County =

Kiełpino
- Village
- Location within Poland
- Coordinates: 53°11′19″N 15°38′40″E
- Country: Poland
- Voivodeship: West Pomeranian
- County: Choszczno
- Gmina: Drawno
- Population (approx.): 1,500
- Time zone: UTC+1 (CET)
  - Summer (DST): UTC+2 (CEST)
- Area code: +48 95
- Car plates: ZCH
- Website: http://www.kielpino.staszczyk.eu/

Kiełpino [kʲɛu̯ˈpinɔ] (German: Cölpin) is a village in the administrative district of Gmina Drawno, within Choszczno County, West Pomeranian Voivodeship, in north-western Poland. It lies approximately 8 km (5 mi) south-west of Drawno, 17 km (11 mi) east of Choszczno, and 75 km (47 mi) east of the regional capital Szczecin.

The village has an approximate population of 1,500.

A Baroque manor house, dating back to the 18th century, is located in the village.
