= Prostynia, Choszczno County =

Prostynia
- Village
- Location within Poland
- Coordinates: 53°19′N 15°45′E
- Country: Poland
- Voivodeship: West Pomeranian
- County: Choszczno
- Gmina: Drawno
- Time zone: UTC+1 (CET)
  - Summer (DST): UTC+2 (CEST)
- Area code: +48 95
- Car plates: ZCH

Prostynia [prɔsˈtɨɲa] is a village in the administrative district of Gmina Drawno, within Choszczno County, West Pomeranian Voivodeship, in north-western Poland. It lies approximately 12 km (7 mi) north of Drawno, 29 km (18 mi) north-east of Choszczno, and 79 km (49 mi) east of the regional capital Szczecin.
