= Rościn =

Rościn may refer to the following places in West Pomeranian Voivodeship, Poland:

- Rościn, Choszczno County
- Rościn, Myślibórz County
