= Kiełpino =

Kiełpino may refer to the following places:

- Kiełpino, Pomeranian Voivodeship (north Poland)
- Kiełpino, Choszczno County in West Pomeranian Voivodeship (north-west Poland)
- Kiełpino, Gryfice County in West Pomeranian Voivodeship (north-west Poland)
- Kiełpino, Szczecinek County in West Pomeranian Voivodeship (north-west Poland)
