= Bogdan-Dawid Wojdowski =

Polish writer (1930–1994)

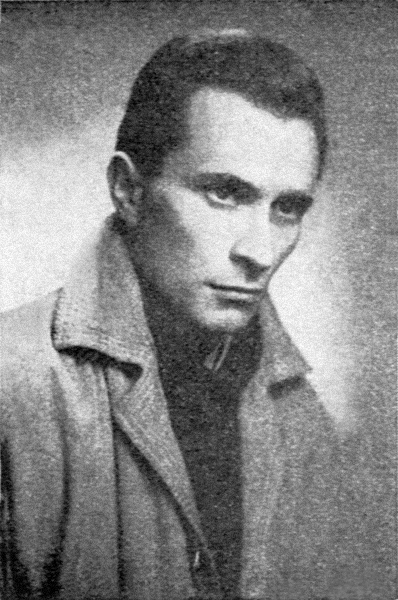
- Born: Dawid Wojdowski; 30 November 1930; Warsaw, Poland
- Died: 21 April 1994 (aged 63); Warsaw, Poland
- Occupation: Writer
- Writing career
- Pen name: Bogdan Kamiński

Bogdan-Dawid Wojdowski (Yiddish: בוגדאן-דוד ווידובסקי,30 November 1930 –21 April 1994) was a Polish-Jewish writer of Yiddish (Ashkenazic) background.

== Name ==
The writer was born Dawid Wojdowski. During World War II, under German occupation, he used an 'ethnically Polish' (that is, more Catholic-sounding) pseudonym 'Bogdan Kamiński'. After the war, in light of strong antisemitism in communist Poland, he melded his pseudonym's first name with his surname that does not point to his Jewish cultural and social background. As an adult and writer, he became known as 'Bogdan Wojdowski'. Yet, later in his life, to emphasize the fact that he was not a Pole-Catholic, but a Jew of a Polish cultural background, he started using his birth name Dawid in preference to Bogdan.

== Early life and education ==
Dawid Wojdowski was born to a Jewish (Ashkenazic) family in Warsaw, which at that time was the cultural center of Yiddishland, or Central Europe's zone of Yiddish language and culture. His father, Szymon Jakub Wojdowski, was an upholsterer and joiner. His own traditional family of Hassidic character was Yiddish-speaking. On the other hand, the family of Dawid's mother, Edwarda Bark, was of assimilationist and leftist leanings, and thus, Polish-speaking. Father spoke Yiddish to his wife and children (that is, Dawid and his younger sister, Irena), but mother spoke Polish with the children, who also received Polish-language education.

During the war, together with about half a million Jews from Warsaw and the vicinity, the German occupation authorities made Wojdowski's family move to the Warsaw Ghetto. The lived in the ghetto between November 1940 and August 1942. His parents perished in the Holocaust, but Dawid-Bogdan and his sister Irena were separately smuggled out of the ghetto and survived. Among others, Jadwiga Danuta Koszutska-Issat hid Dawid-Bogdan from the Germans, while, Irena Sendler his sister.

After the war, in 1949, Wojdowski graduated from secondary school in Warsaw. Then he studied Polish language and literature at the University of Warsaw, and wrote a master's thesis under Zdzisław Libera's supervision. He worked as a journalist and dreamed to become a writer, despite widespread antisemitism that convinced most of his family and Jewish acquaintances to leave Poland. In 1957 the state censors thoroughly altered the shape of his first book Wakacje Hioba ('Job's Vacation'), and delayed its publication by five years, until 1962. In 1964 he lost his last permanent job, and since then he had to work as a freelancer. Even the 1968 ethnic cleansing of Poland's Jews did not change his resolution to stay in Poland despite all odds. However, when communism finally came to an end in 1989, Wojdowski regretted that he had not emigrated to Israel immediately after the war. It was actually the Polish language in which he wrote that prevented him from leaving.

== Career ==
In 1971 his most important work was published, namely, Chleb rzucony umarłym (Bread for the Departed). Two years later, in 1973, he married Maria Iwaszkiewicz-Wojdowska. She was a daughter of Jarosław Iwaszkiewicz, one of communist Poland's most important writers, whom the authorities tasked with controlling the country's literary life. Between 1971 and 1974, Wojdowski cooperated with the Soviet bloc's last remaining Yiddish-language periodical of note פֿאָלקס שטימע folks sztime. He visited Israel only once, in 1986, where he met with his mother's sister Ida Bark and her family, who had left Poland in 1957.

After the fall of communism, Wojdowski hoped for a revival of Jewish cultural life in postcommunist Poland. To this end, in 1991, he founded the journal Masada, which however, went defunct after the publication of the first issue. In 1993 the writer published his famous essay 'Judaizm jako los' (Judaism as Fate), on which he had worked since 1989. Wojdowski proposes that the Jewish religion or a cultural memory thereof is at the heart of Jewishness, making the Jews into a civilization in its own right. After the Shoah no Jew can give up on their Judaism with impunity. In relation to gentiles, Wojdowski, as a Jew, does not demand acceptance but liberty. He saw liberty as the necessary foundation on which he could relate to any other individual.

== Legacy ==
All his adult life, Wojdowski had periods of acute depression, which at that time was still not diagnosed as PTSD caused by the Holocaust. As a result, like many other Holocaust survivors who became writers (for instance, Jean Améry, Paul Celan or Primo Levi), in 1994, Wojdowski killed himself.

In 2013, Wojdowski's widow Maria Iwaszkiewicz-Wojdowska and sister Irena Grabska gifted the writer's archive to the National Library of Poland in Warsaw. The following year, the Polish Book Institute purchased the rights to Wojdowski's opus magnum The Bread for the Departed, which can now be published and translated into other languages free of charge.

== Bread for the Departed (1971) ==
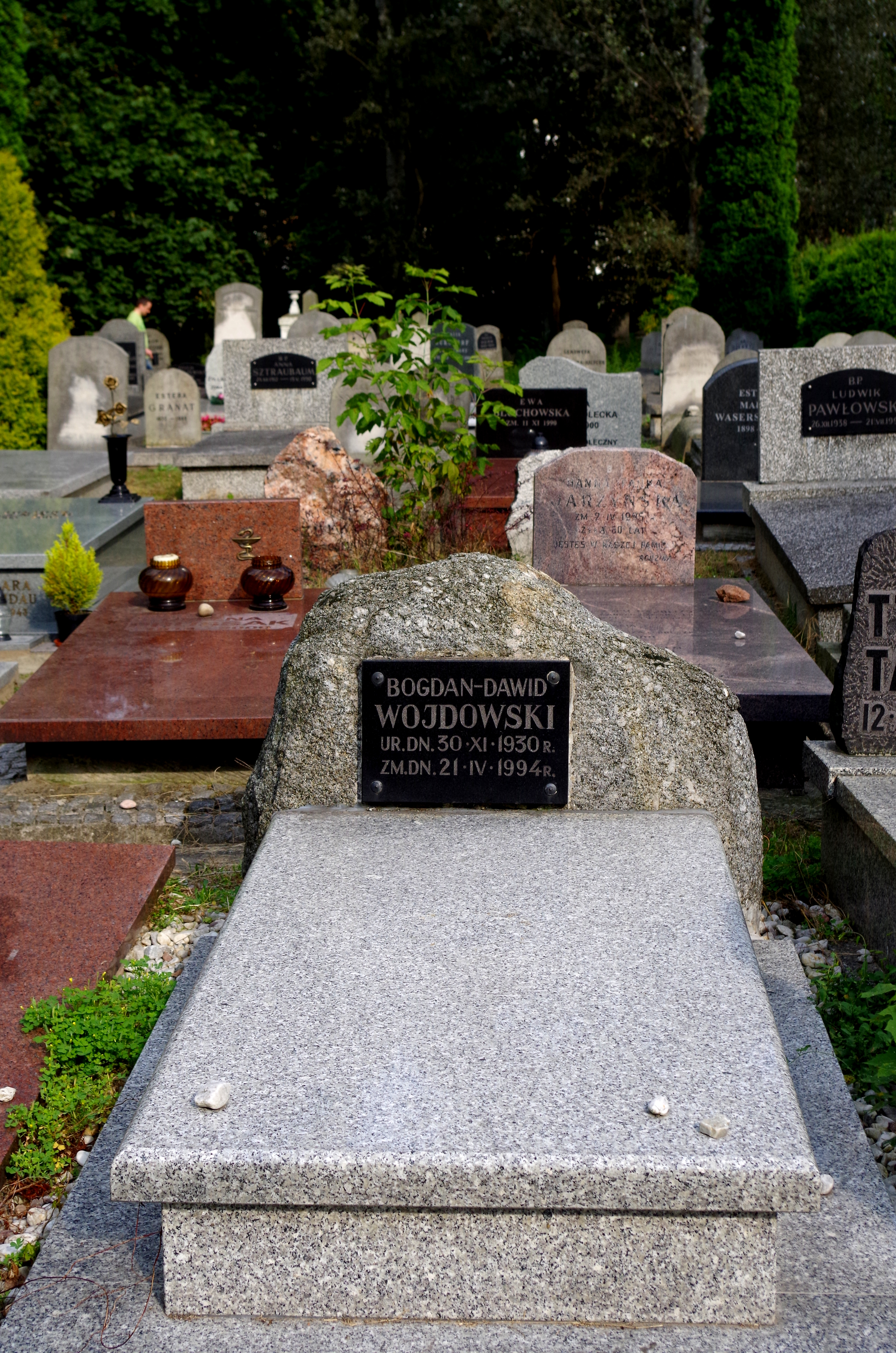
Grave of Wojdowski at the Okopowa Street Jewish Cemetery in Warsaw

Wojdowski worked for over a decade on his novel Chleb rzucony umarłym (Bread for the Departed). It is the only novel devoted to the Warsaw Ghetto that was written by one of the ghetto's Jewish inmates. The plot is based on the writer's experiences, yet it is not an autobiography. The Polish-language prose of this novel actually masks the overwhelmingly Yiddish-speaking character of the ghetto. Warsaw prior to the war was Europe's largest Jewish city. However, ethnic (Catholic) Poles constituted the majority of the inhabitants, entailing that the city quarters with Jewish pluralities or majorities were actually bilingual, Yiddish- and Polish-speaking. The forced separation of Warsaw's Jews and Poles of Jewish origin in this ghetto created an almost homogeneously Yiddish-speaking Jewish sub-city in wartime Warsaw. In inventive Polish phrasing and metaphors Wojdowski presents different Jewish voices and social strata, who live in accordance with the Jewish calendar and religious holidays. The narrative's focus is on everyday life's concerns in the shadow of the Holocaust, and the characters' reactions to and thoughts on the looming extermination.

Due to communist Poland's persisting antisemitism, this work of European and world literature never made it to the lists of assigned readings recommended for Polish schools. The novel was deemed too 'Jewish' and 'un-Polish,' despite its unprecedented artistic achievements, and in spite of how faithfully Wojdowski portrayed life in the ghetto. It was a turning point in his literary career. Afterward, Wojdowski devoted his writing solely to the Holocaust, unlike any postwar Polish writer, who remained in postwar Poland.

== Works ==
- 1962: Wakacje Hioba [ Job's Vacation] (short stories). Warsaw: Państwowy Instytut Wydawniczy, 248pp.
  - Japanese translation: ボグダン・ヴォイドフスキ Bogudan Vuoidofusuki. 1973. この明日なき旅路 Kono ashita naki tabij [literally: This Journey Without Tomorrow, translated from the Polish by 岩淵 正嘉 MASAYOSHI Iwabuchi]. Tokyo: 世紀社 出版 Shuppan, 236pp.
- 1966: Konotop (novel). Warsaw: Czytelnik, 176pp [illustrated by Marian Stachurski (1931–1980)]. The book's title is the name of a village Konotop in northwestern Poland. NB: 2nd edition in 1982, ISBN 8307005450, 156pp.
- 1966: Próba bez kostiumu. Szkice o teatrze [Non-dress Rehearsal: Sketches about the Theater] (essays). Warsaw: Państwowy Instytut Wydawniczy, 260pp.
- 1971: Chleb rzucony umarłym [Bread for the Departed] (novel). Warsaw: Państwowy Instytut Wydawniczy, 502pp. NB: 2nd edition in 1973, 510pp; 3rd edition in 1975, Ser: Biblioteka Literatury XXX-lecia, 376pp; 4th, 5th and 6th editions in 1978, 1979 ISBN 8306002172 and 1981 ISBN 8306002172, Ser: Kolekcja Polskiej Literatury Współczesnej, 376pp; 7th edition in 1990, ISBN 8306020081, 372pp; 8th edition in 2005, Ser: Biblioteka Klasyki, Wrocław: Wydawnictwo Dolnośląskie, ISBN 8373842322, 364pp; 9th edition in 2018, Warsaw: Fundacja Nowoczesna Polska, ISBN 9788328854734, ebook.
  - German translation: Brot für die Toten [translated from the Polish by Henryk Bereska ] (Ser: Buchclub, Vol. 65). 1974. [East] Berlin: Verlag Volk und Welt, 410pp. NB: 2nd edition in 1981, 390pp; 3rd edition (changed): Brot für die Toten [edited by Sascha Feuchert, Lothar Quinkenstein and Ewa Czerwiakowski]. 2021. Göttingen: Wallstein Verlag (Ser: Bibliothek der polnischen Holocaustliteratur, Vol. 1) . ISBN 9783835338173, 466pp.
  - Japanese translation: ボグダン・ヴォイドフスキ Bogudan Vuoidofusuki. 死者に投げられたパン Shisha ni nagerareta pan [translated from the Polish by 小原 雅俊 MASATOSHI Kohara ]. 1976. Tokyo: 光文社 Kōbunsha, 414pp. NB: 2nd edition in 1978, ISBN 9784770402271; 3rd edition in 1989.
  - Hebrew translation: בוגדאן ווידובסקי Bogdan Ṿoidovsḳi לחם זרוק למתים Leḥem zaruḳ la-metim [translated from the Polish by תיאודור התלגי Te'odor Hatalgi (1917–2006)]. 5761 [1981]. Jerusalem: דביר Devir. ISBN 9789650100599, 312pp.
  - English translation: Bread for the Departed [translated from the Polish by Madeline G. Levine; introduced by Henryk Grynberg ]. 1998. Evanston, Illinois IL: Northwestern University Press. ISBN 9780810114562, 302pp.
  - Hungarian translation: A holtaknak vetett kenyér [translated from the Polish by Lajos Pálfalvi, Yiddish and German fragments translated by Zoltán Halasi, Hebrew fragments translated by Szandra Juhász]. 2014. Budapest: Park Könyvkiadó. ISBN 9789633550427, 464pp.
  - Spanish translation: Pan para los muertos. Historias del gueto de Varsovia [literally: Bread for the Departed: Stories from the Warsaw Ghetto; translated from the Polish and introduced by Elżbieta Bortkiewicz, afterword by José Miguel Parra] (Ser: Colección Casa Europa, Vol. 8). 2017. Almería: Editorial Confluencias. ISBN 9788494637919, 552pp.
  - Macedonian translation: Леб фрлен на умрените Leb frlen na umrenite. Скопје: Пагома прес Skopje: Pagoma pres [translated from the Polish by Петре Наковски Petre Nakovski]. ISBN 9786084858201, 470pp.
- 1975: Mały człowieczek, nieme ptaszę, klatka i świat [A Little Man, a Mute Bird, a Cage and the World] (short stories). Warsaw: Państwowy Instytut Wydawniczy, 172pp.
  - Italian translationa Il sentiero [literally: The Path; translated from the Polish by Marcin Wyrembalski; preface by Erri De Luca ] (Ser: Stile contemporaneo, Vol. 6). 2015. Pisa: Felici. ISBN 9788869400094, 180pp.
  - German translation: Ein kleines Menschlein, ein stummes Vögelchen, ein Käfig und die Welt [translated from the Polish by Karin Wolff and Lothar Quinkenstein, edited by Ewa Czerwiakowski, Sascha Feuchert and Lothar Quinkenstein] (Ser: Bibliothek der polnischen Holocaustliteratur, Vol. 2). 2022. Göttingen: Wallstein Verlag. ISBN 9783835348059, 192pp.
- 1978: 7 opowiadań [7 Short Stories]. Warsaw: Państwowy Instytut Wydawniczy, 202pp. ISBN 8306004140
- 1980: Maniuś Bany [NB: The book's title is a character's name] (short stories). Warsaw: Państwowy Instytut Wydawniczy, 224pp.
- 1981: Wybór opowiadań [Selected Stories] (Ser: Kolekcja Polskiej Literatury Współczesnej). Warsaw: Państwowy Instytut Wydawniczy. ISBN 8306004787, 328pp. NB: 2nd edition in 1985, ISBN 8306012283.
- 1982: Mit Szigalewa – szkice [Shigalev's Myth: Essays]. Warsaw: Państwowy Instytut Wydawniczy. ISBN 8306008065, 284pp.
- 1987: Krzywe drogi [Crooked Paths] (short stories). Warsaw: Państwowy Instytut Wydawniczy. ISBN 8306013352, 176pp.
- 1991: List otwarty do pisarzy pokolenia Shoah [The Open Letter to Writers of the Shoah Generation] (pp 7–18). Masada. Vol. 1, No. 1.
- 1993: Judaizm jako los [Judaism as Fate] (essay) (pp 61–78). Puls (London). Vol. 15, No. 3 (62); 2nd edition in 2004: Judaizm jako los (pp 26–32). Midrasz. Pismo żydowskie (published in Warsaw by The Ronald S. Lauder Foundation / Fundacja Ronalda S. Laudera and Stowarzyszenie "Midrasz"). Vol. 9, No. 5.
- 1997: Tamta strona [The Other Side] (novel). Wrocław: Wydawnictwo Dolnośląskie. ISBN 837023609X, 144pp.
