= Prostynia =

Prostynia may refer to the following places in Poland:

- Prostynia, Lower Silesian Voivodeship (south-west Poland)
- Prostynia, Choszczno County in West Pomeranian Voivodeship (north-west Poland)
- Prostynia, Drawsko County in West Pomeranian Voivodeship
