= Zacisze =

Zacisze, which means "shelter" or "tranquillity," may refer to the following places in Poland:

- Zacisze, Lower Silesian Voivodeship (south-west Poland)
- Zacisze, Lublin Voivodeship (east Poland)
- Zacisze, Gmina Supraśl in Podlaskie Voivodeship (north-east Poland)
- Zacisze, Gmina Zabłudów in Podlaskie Voivodeship (north-east Poland)
- Zacisze, Sokółka County in Podlaskie Voivodeship (north-east Poland)
- Zacisze, Poddębice County in Łódź Voivodeship (central Poland)
- Zacisze, Radomsko County in Łódź Voivodeship (central Poland)
- Zacisze, Masovian Voivodeship (east-central Poland)
- Zacisze, Czarnków-Trzcianka County in Greater Poland Voivodeship (west-central Poland)
- Zacisze, Gostyń County in Greater Poland Voivodeship (west-central Poland)
- Zacisze, Słupca County in Greater Poland Voivodeship (west-central Poland)
- Zacisze, Gorzów County in Lubusz Voivodeship (west Poland)
- Zacisze, Nowa Sól County in Lubusz Voivodeship (west Poland)
- Zacisze, Warmian-Masurian Voivodeship (north Poland)
- Zacisze, Choszczno County in West Pomeranian Voivodeship (north-west Poland)
- Zacisze, Gryfice County in West Pomeranian Voivodeship (north-west Poland)
- Zacisze, Koszalin County in West Pomeranian Voivodeship (north-west Poland)
