= Brodźce, West Pomeranian Voivodeship =

Brodźce
- Village
- Location within Poland
- Coordinates: 53°13′48″N 16°00′00″E
- Country: Poland
- Voivodeship: West Pomeranian
- County: Choszczno
- Gmina: Drawno
- Time zone: UTC+1 (CET)
  - Summer (DST): UTC+2 (CEST)
- Area code: +48 95
- Car plates: ZCH

Brodźce [ˈbrɔt͡ɕt͡sɛ] is a village in the administrative district of Gmina Drawno, within Choszczno County, West Pomeranian Voivodeship, in north-western Poland.

Before 1945 the village was German-settled and part of the German state of Prussia.
