= Sicienko =

Sicienko may refer to the following places:

- Sicienko, Kuyavian-Pomeranian Voivodeship (north-central Poland)
- Sicienko, Choszczno County in West Pomeranian Voivodeship (north-west Poland)
- Sicienko, Myślibórz County in West Pomeranian Voivodeship (north-west Poland)
