= Zamek, West Pomeranian Voivodeship =

Zamek
- Settlement
- Location within Poland
- Coordinates: 53°10′30″N 15°52′20″E
- Country: Poland
- Voivodeship: West Pomeranian
- County: Choszczno
- Gmina: Drawno
- Time zone: UTC+1 (CET)
  - Summer (DST): UTC+2 (CEST)
- Area code: +48 95
- Car plates: ZCH

Zamek [ˈzamɛk] (German: Schloß Nemischhof) is a settlement in the administrative district of Gmina Drawno, within Choszczno County, West Pomeranian Voivodeship, in north-western Poland.
