= Gmina Drawno =

Gmina Drawno Drawno Commune
- Gmina
- Coat of arms
- Interactive map of Gmina Drawno
- Coordinates (Drawno): 53°13′N 15°45′E
- Country: Poland
- Voivodeship: West Pomeranian
- County: Choszczno
- Seat: Drawno

Area
  - Total: 321.09 km^{2} (123.97 sq mi)

Population (2006)
  - Total: 5,340
  - Density: 16.6/km^{2} (43.1/sq mi)
  - Urban: 2,399
  - Rural: 2,941
- Website: http://www.drawno.pl/

Gmina Drawno is an urban-rural gmina (administrative district) in Choszczno County, West Pomeranian Voivodeship, in north-western Poland. Its seat is the town of Drawno, which lies approximately 24 kilometres (15 mi) east of Choszczno and 81 km (50 mi) east of the regional capital Szczecin.

The gmina covers an area of 321.09 square kilometres (124.0 sq mi), and as of 2006 its total population is 5,340 (out of which the population of Drawno amounts to 2,399, and the population of the rural part of the gmina is 2,941).

== Villages ==
Apart from the town of Drawno, Gmina Drawno contains the villages and settlements of Barników, Barnimie, Bogdanka, Borki, Borowiec, Brac, Brodźce, Brzeziny, Chomętowo, Dobrojewo, Dolina, Dominikowo, Drawnik, Gack, Gładysz, Janków, Jaźwiny, Karpin, Karpinek, Kawczyn, Kępa, Kiełpino, Kolonia Kniewo, Konotop, Kośnik, Kostrzewa, Maciejów, Międzybór, Niemieńsko, Niemieńsko-Zamek, Nowa Korytnica, Ostrożyce, Podegrodzie, Podlesie, Prostynia, Przysiekiercze, Pszczewko, Rogoźnica, Rościn, Samborz, Sicienko, Sieniawa, Skrzaty, Śmieszkowo, Święciechów, Wiśniewo, Zacisze, Zalesie, Zatom, Zdanów, Żółwinko and Żółwino.

== Neighbouring gminas ==
Gmina Drawno is bordered by the gminas of Bierzwnik, Choszczno, Człopa, Dobiegniew, Kalisz Pomorski, Recz and Tuczno.
