= Christina Thürmer-Rohr =

German feminist philosopher and social scientist

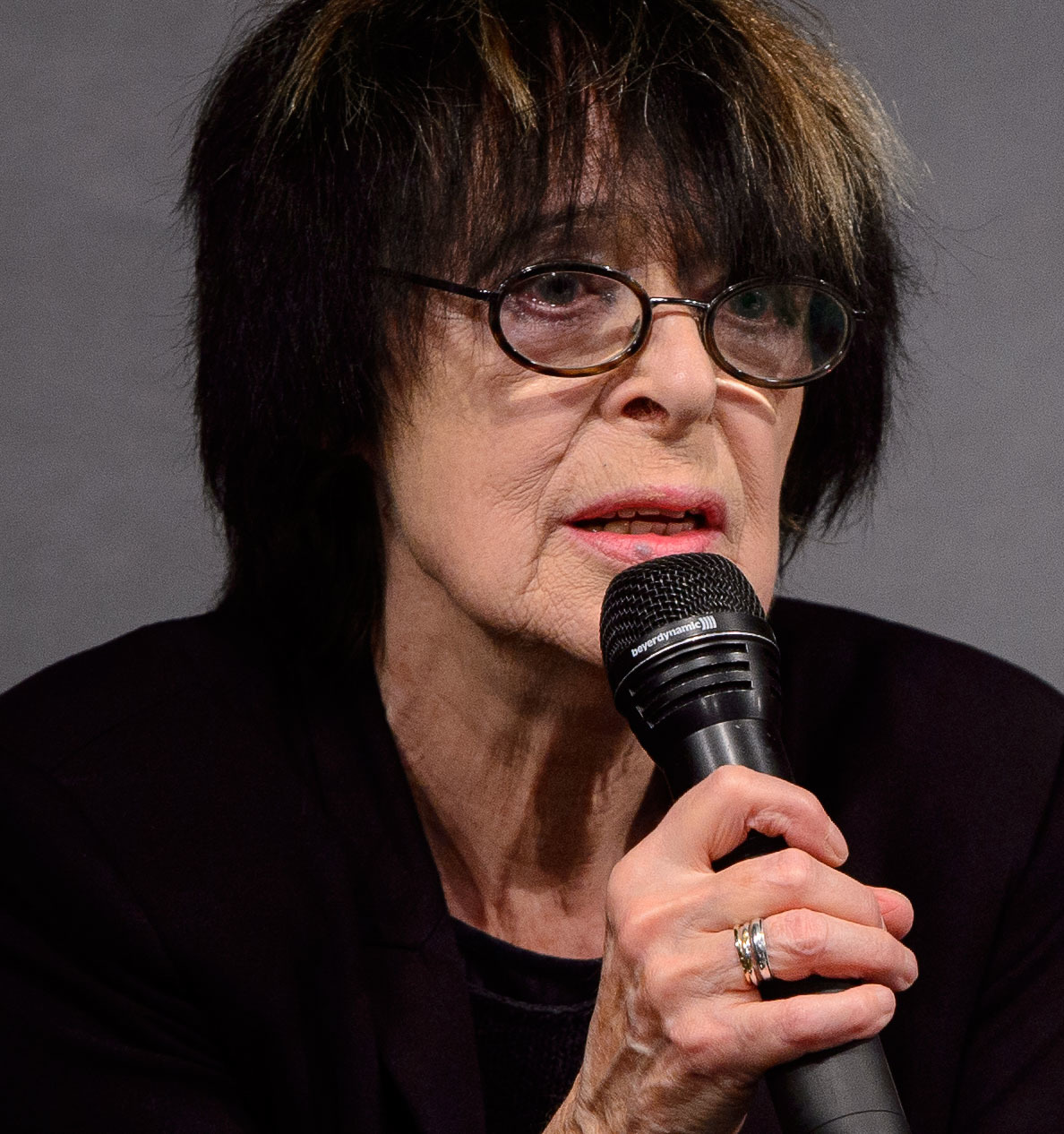
Christina Thürmer-Rohr, 2014

Christina Thürmer-Rohr (17 November 1936 - 10 September 2026) was a feminist philosopher and social scientist, and a Professor Emeritus at Technische Universität Berlin. She has been largely collected by libraries worldwide.

Thürmer-Rohr was born in Arnswalde, Province of Brandenburg, Germany (Choszczno, Poland). She studied philosophy and psychology in Freiburg and Heidelberg.

== Academic work ==
Her publications include: Vagabundinnen. Feministische Essays (1987), Verlorene Narrenfreiheit (1994) and various articles and essays that have been published in cultural political magazines and journals. Vagabundinnen was translated into English by Lise Weil and published by Beacon Press.
