= Kostrzewa (surname) =

Kostrzewa is a surname. It is derived from the Polish word kostrzewa ("fescue").

Notable people with the surname include:

- Andrzej Kostrzewa (born 1958), Polish fencer
- Dorothy Kostrzewa (1928–2013), Canadian politician
- Klara Sierońska-Kostrzewa (1913–1990), Polish gymnast
- Maciej Kostrzewa (born 1991), Polish footballer
- Marek Kostrzewa (born 1957), Polish footballer
- Ute Kostrzewa (born 1961), German volleyball player
- Wera Kostrzewa, pseudonym of Maria Koszutska (1876–1939), Polish politician
- Wojciech Kostrzewa (born 1960), Polish entrepreneur
- Yga Kostrzewa (born 1973), Polish LGBT activist, writer and economist
- Zdzisław Kostrzewa (1955–1991), Polish footballer
