= Rogoźnica, Podkarpackie Voivodeship =

Rogoźnica
- Village
- Location within Poland
- Coordinates: 50°6′N 21°58′E
- Country: Poland
- Voivodeship: Subcarpathian
- County: Rzeszów County
- Town: Głogów Małopolski

Rogoźnica [rɔɡɔʑˈnit͡sa] is a village which was until 31 December 2019 in the administrative district of Gmina Głogów Małopolski, within Rzeszów County, Subcarpathian Voivodeship, in south-eastern Poland. From 1 January 2020 it became part of the town of Głogów Małopolski. It lies approximately 8 kilometres (5 mi) south of Głogów Małopolski and 8 km (5 mi) north of the regional capital Rzeszów.
