= Drawno =

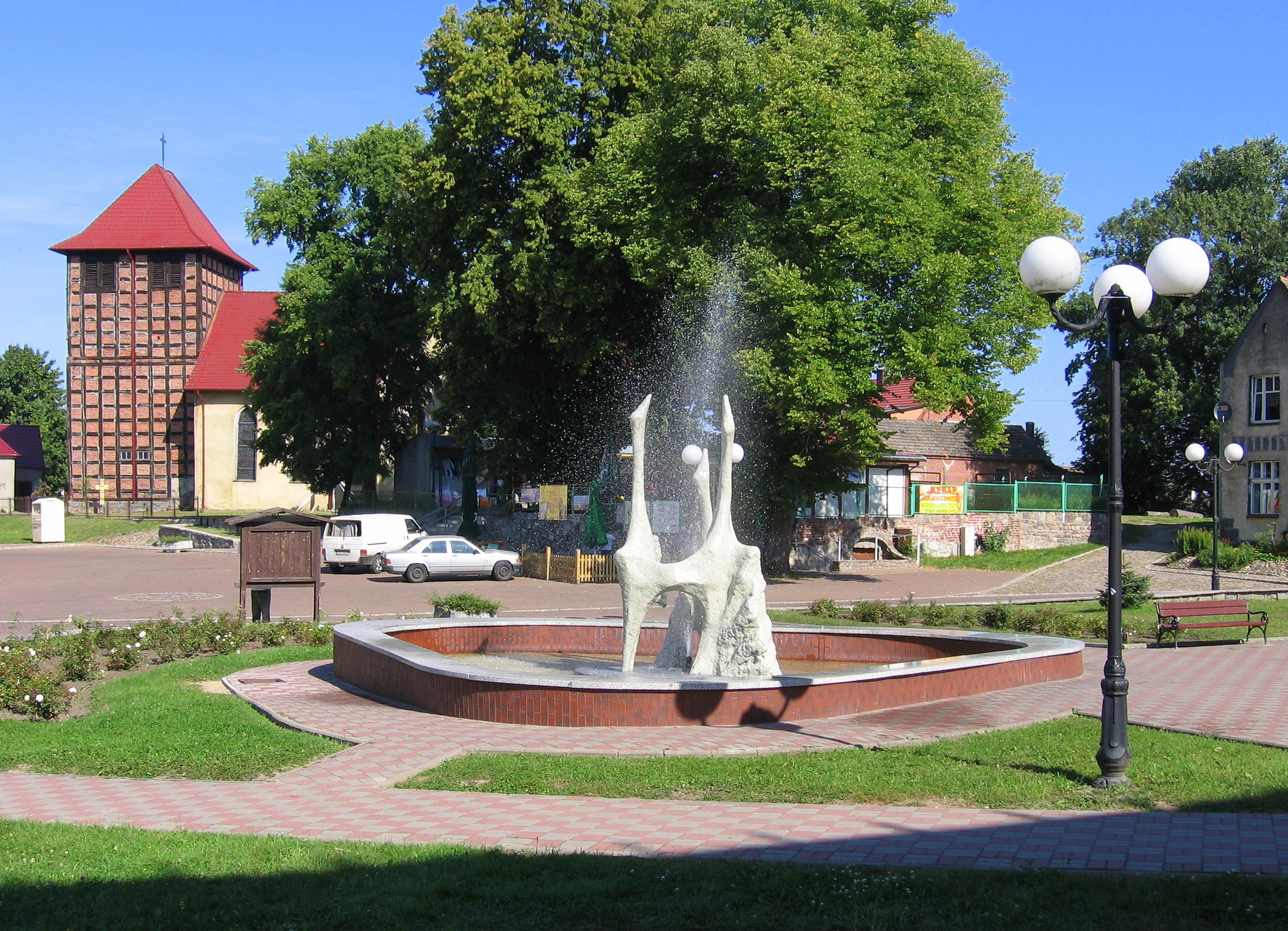
- Town square

- Coat of arms

- Location within Poland
- Coordinates: 53°13′N 15°45′E
- Country: Poland
- Voivodeship: West Pomeranian
- County: Choszczno
- Gmina: Drawno
- Town rights: 14th century

Government
  - Mayor: Wojciech Wiśniowski

Area
  - Total: 5.03 km^{2} (1.94 sq mi)

Population (31 December 2021)
  - Total: 2,219
  - Density: 441/km^{2} (1,140/sq mi)
- Postal code: 73-220
- Area code: +48 95
- Car plates: ZCH
- Website: https://www.drawno.pl

Drawno [ˈdravnɔ] (German: Neuwedell) is a town in Choszczno County, West Pomeranian Voivodeship, in north-western Poland, with 2,219 inhabitants as of December 2021. The headquarters of the Drawa National Park (Drawieński Park Narodowy) are located here.

== History ==
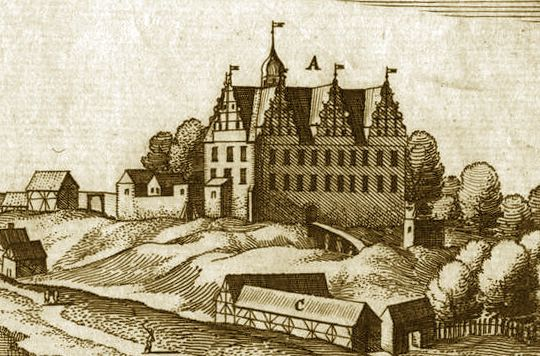
Former castle in Drawno on a 17th-century drawing

The territory became part of the emerging Polish state under its first ruler Mieszko I around 967. In the 10th-11th centuries, using the suitable location between two lakes, a Slavic gród and a fishing village were established here. In different periods in the Middle Ages it was a part of Pomerania or Greater Poland. In the 13th century Drawno was part of the Duchy of Greater Poland, a province of fragmented Poland.

Town rights were granted between 1313 and 1333. From 1373 Drawno was part of the Lands of the Bohemian Crown (or Czech Lands), ruled by the Luxembourg dynasty. In 1402, the Luxembourgs reached an agreement with Poland in Kraków. Poland was to buy and re-incorporate Drawno and its surroundings, but eventually the Luxembourgs sold the city to the Teutonic Order. During the Polish–Teutonic War (1431–35) Drawno rebelled against the Order to join Poland and recognized the Polish King as rightful ruler, but after the Peace of Brześć Kujawski, the town, after receiving a guarantee of impunity for siding with Poland, returned to the rule of the Teutonic Knights, although, as it turned out, for a short time - only until 1454.

The medieval castle was rebuilt in Renaissance style around 1600, but later on it was destroyed in the 17th and 18th century wars.

== Gallery ==
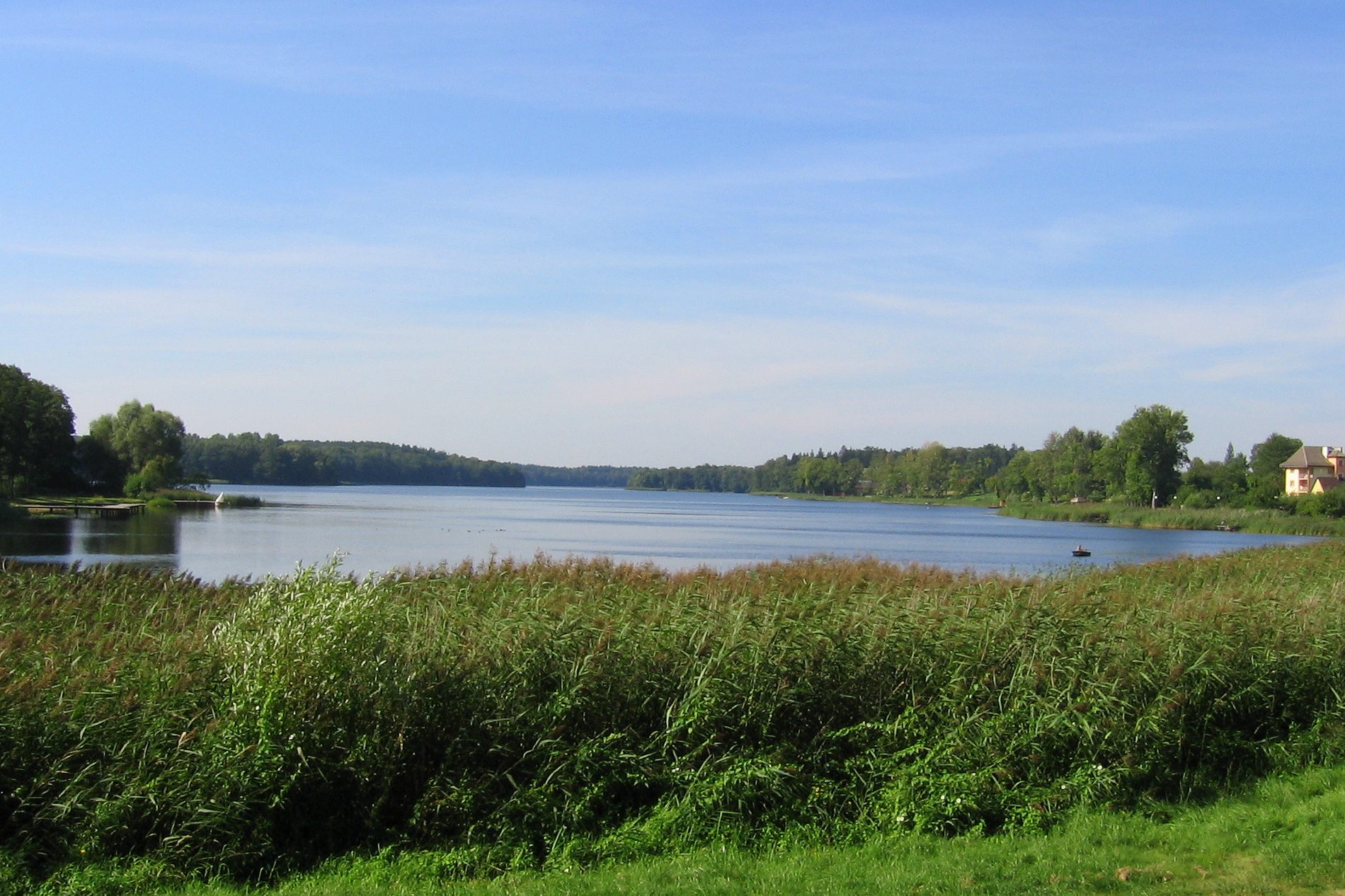
Dubie Lake

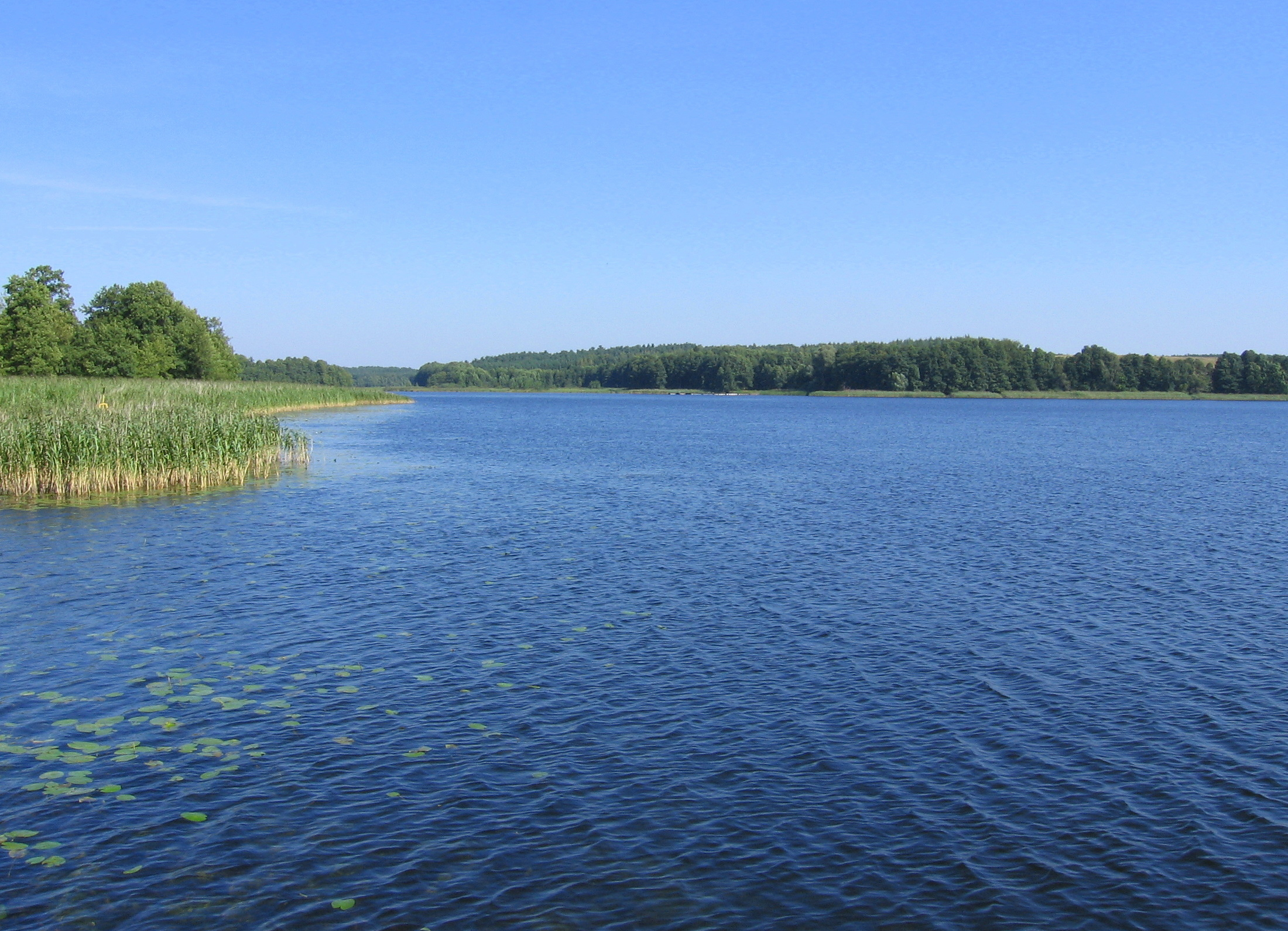
Rudno Lake

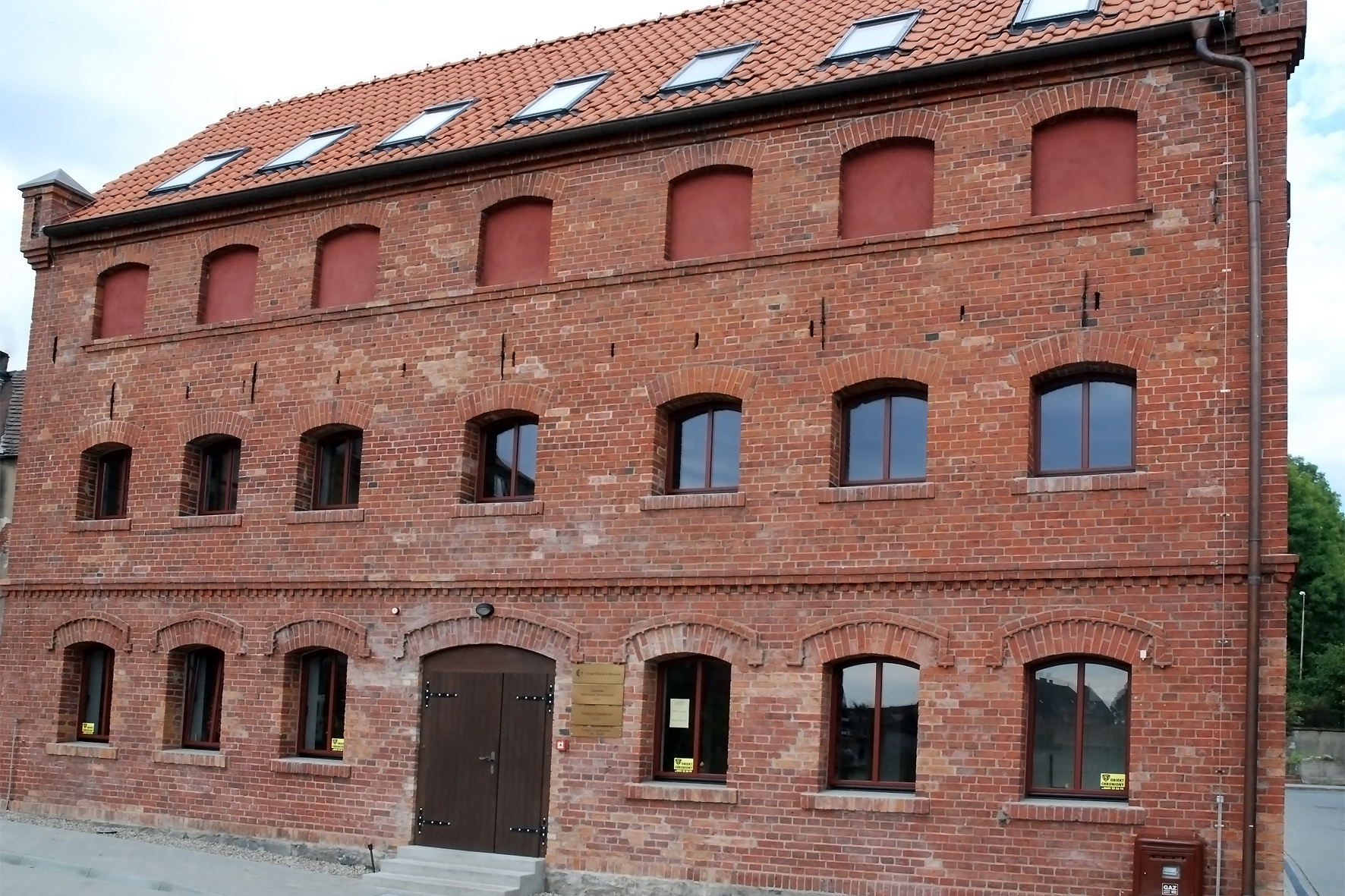
Old granary, now a museum

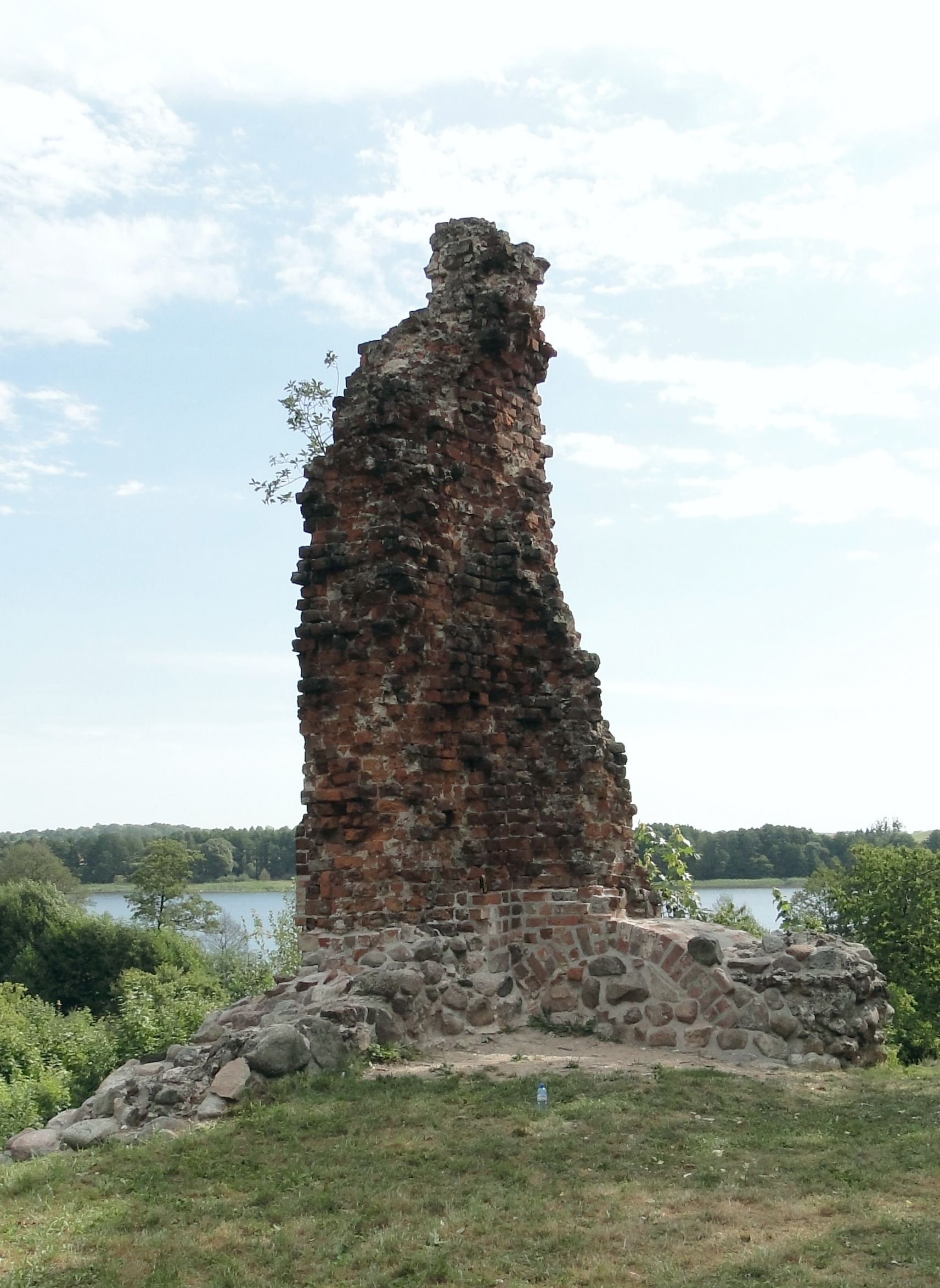
Ruins of the Drawno Castle

== Transport ==
Drawno lies on voivodeship road 175.

The nearest railway station is in Kalisz Pomorski.

== Notable residents ==
- Erich Rüdiger von Wedel (1892–1954), German World War I flying ace
