= Choszczno =

Town in West Pomeranian Voivodeship, Poland

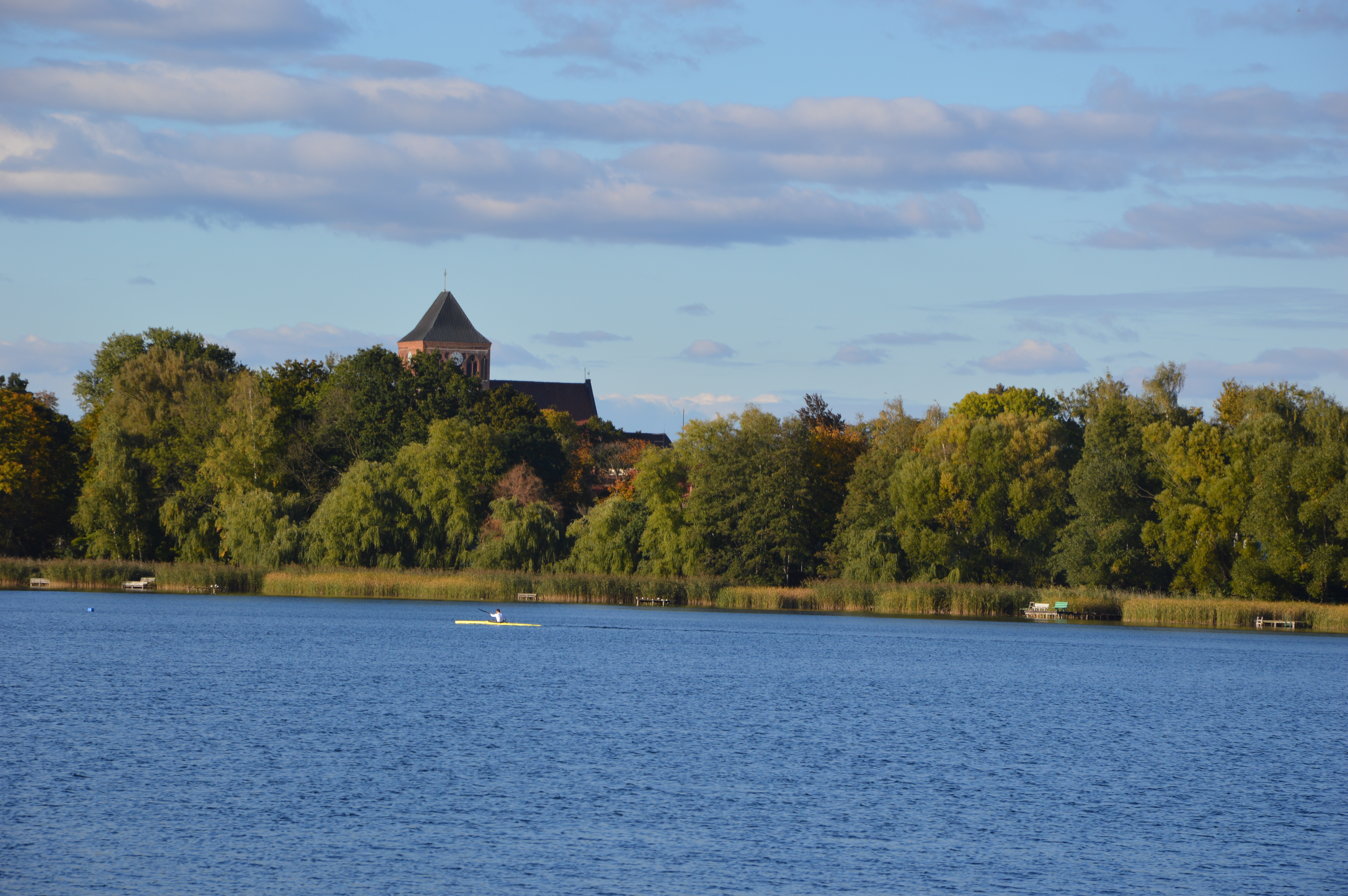
- Lake Kluki and the St. Mary's church in the background

- Flag Coat of arms

- Location within Poland
- Coordinates: 53°10′N 15°24′E
- Country: Poland
- Voivodeship: West Pomeranian
- County: Choszczno
- Gmina: Choszczno
- Town rights: 1284

Government
  - Mayor: Artur Raczyński

Area
  - Total: 9.58 km^{2} (3.70 sq mi)

Population (31 December 2021)
  - Total: 14,831
  - Density: 1,550/km^{2} (4,010/sq mi)
- Time zone: UTC+1 (CET)
  - Summer (DST): UTC+2 (CEST)
- Postal code: 73-200, 73-201
- Area code: +48 95
- Vehicle registration: ZCH
- Website: http://www.choszczno.pl/

Choszczno [ˈxɔʂt͡ʂnɔ] (German: Arnswalde) is a town in the West Pomeranian Voivodeship, in north-western Poland. As of December 2021, the town has a population of 14,831. The town is in a marshy district between the river Stobnica and Klukom lake, 32 kilometres (20 mi) southeast of Stargard and on the main railway line between Szczecin and Poznań. Besides the Gothic church, there are a number of historical buildings from the 19th century industrial period namely, a gasification plant and a water pressure tower which dominates the town's skyline.

Choszczno is the administrative centre of Choszczno County.

The town was badly affected by the Second World War: 80% of its buildings were damaged or destroyed. The town was rebuilt and is now a center for local government of the Choszczno commune (Polish: gmina). Due to its microclimate the town has become a rehabilitation center for convalescing patients. The close proximity of the lakes has made it a tourist destination for water sports. It has also become a popular destination for golf, as it is home to Modry Las, a top ranked European golf course. Other tourist attractions are 'Wodny Raj' aqua park and Drawieński National Park, located 20 km (12 mi) to the east near the town of Drawno.

Choszczno has a strong military tradition and is the home base for the 2nd Artillery Regiment, which is part of the 12th Mechanised Division headquartered in Szczecin.

The town's industries include: machinery, and the manufacture of clothing, animal feeds and starch.

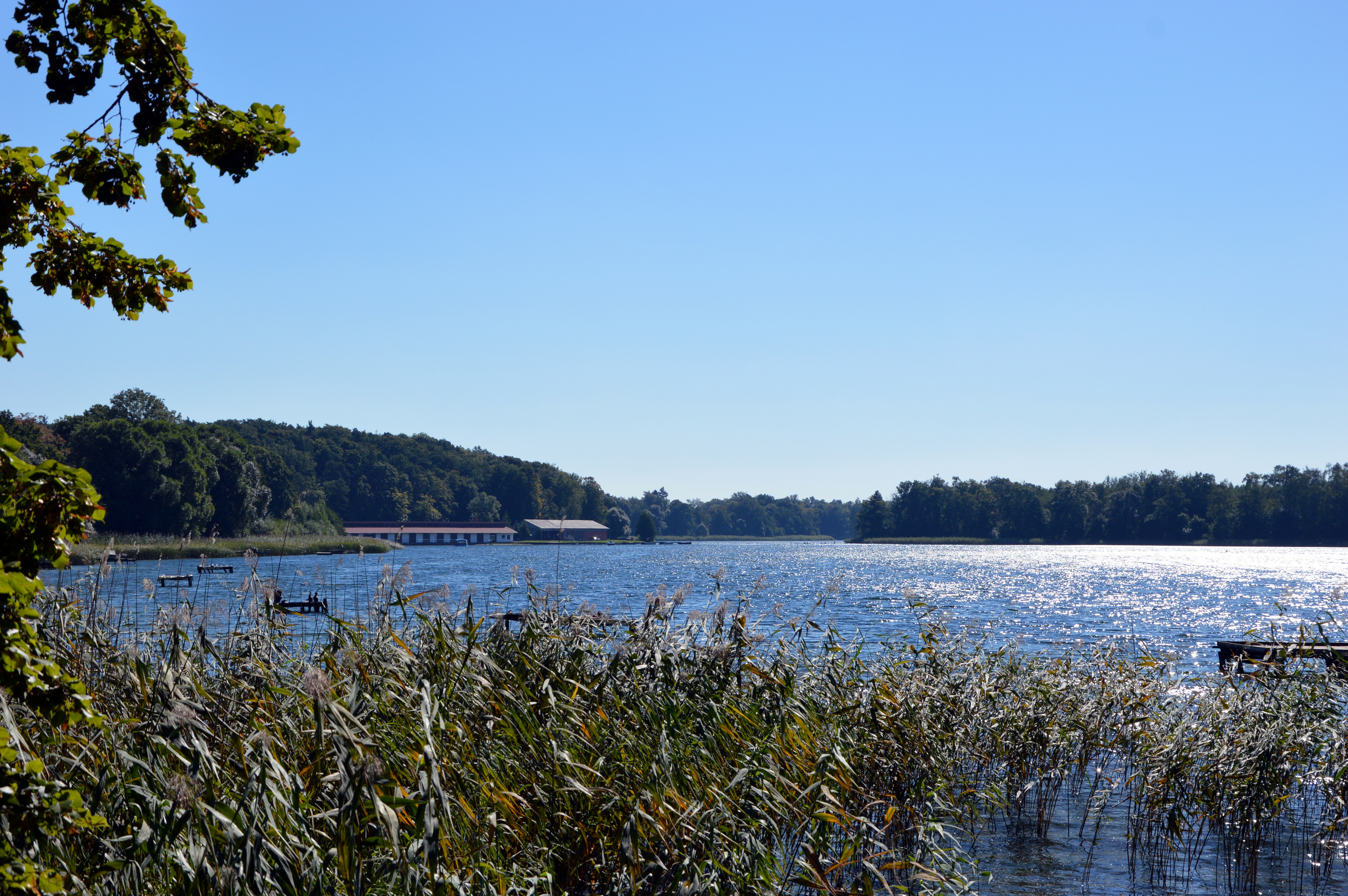
Lake Kluki (also known as Klukom)

== History ==
=== Early history and medieval Poland ===
The area of modern Choszczno County was inhabited going back to at least the 5th century BC; Germanic peoples lived in the area around 1 AD, and no later than the 7th century it was settled by Slavs. A defensive gród and most likely a trading settlement was at the site of modern Choszczno. In the years 963–967 the Polish ruler Mieszko I incorporated the area into Piast Poland, though because it was on the border of Poland, towards the end of the 11th century the ties with the central authority of the Polish dukes became looser. Control of the Polish rulers over the Choszczno area was reestablished in 1122 by Bolesław III Wrymouth. After his death and the resulting Feudal fragmentation of Poland among his descendants, the region passed to the Mieszko III the Old of the Duchy of Greater Poland. Under Wrymouth, the region had been included within the Greater Polish castellanies of Drzeń (Drezdenko) and Santok, with the area around modern Choszczno belonging to the northernmost part of the latter. Thus, this area was the northwesternmost portion of the Polish state, and its history departed from that of Western Pomerania which it bordered. The castellans of Drzeń and Santok however exerted direct control only in the core areas of their castellanies, i.e., the area around the Warta and Noteć rivers, while the areas in the north were administered by a local Pomeranian tributary nobility. Quote: "Seit den Eroberungen Boleslaw Krzywoustys in der ersten Hälfte des 12. Jahrhunderts gehörte das Land zwischen Oder und Drage zum großpolnischen Herrschaftsgebiet, und zwar zu den Kastellaneien Zantoch (Santok) und Driesen (Drzen bzw. Drezdenko). Diese unterteilten sich jeweils in ein Kerngebiet um die Kastellaneiburg, das vom Kastellan selbst verwaltet und beherrscht wurde, und in weiter entfernt gelegene, aber von ihr abhängige Landschaften, die einheimischen, pomoranischen Stammes- oder Landesfürsten unterstanden, die den großpolnischen Herzögen gegenüber tributpflichtig waren. Die Bewohner des Landes waren überwiegend pomoranischer Abstammung. Die Kastellanei Zantoch umfaßte damals hauptsächlich das Warthebruch von der Burg flußabwärts bis zur Einmündung des Vietzer Fließes und in ihrer nördlichen Hälfte die beiden Landsberger Grundmoränenplatten, soweit diese schon besiedelt waren."

Through the later 12th and early 13th centuries, Greater Poland had lost control over the northern areas of the Drzeń and Santok castellanies, and the Pomeranians had stopped paying tribute. In the mid-13th century, the area was contested again, when the Silesian dukes took the Santok castellany from Greater Poland (peace with Greater Poland's Władysław Odonic in 1234) and expanded north of the Warta into Pomerania, then ruled by Barnim I who in turn was a vassal of the Brandenburgian margraves. This was a period of abundant donations made by all participants (Barnim, Odonic and Henry) to monk orders, whom the donators expected to secure their borderlands and/or claims. By 1250 however, Barnim had retaken most of the areas lost in the Warta and Noteć area before, and held the northern part of the former Santok and Drzeń castellanies. During the next years, the margraves expanded their New March northward at the expense of Barnim.

=== Hoscno, Sovin, Treben ===
The oldest traces of settlement near modern Choszczno are the archaeological remains of a late Slavic settlement 2 km (1.2 mi) west of the modern town, near Lake Stawin, with an adjacent rampart. The rampart had also been interpreted as late Slavic, yet an archaeological survey did not yield late Slavic finds, but early German finds instead. Therefore, the rampart and the ruins inside are thought to be the remains of the Cistercian grange Sovin. The duke of Greater Poland, Władysław Odonic, donated the Choszczno area to the Cistercian Kołbacz Abbey in 1233. While it was proposed that in this or in a 1234 document, "Hoscno" appears as the oldest written mention of Choszczno, this assertion has been refuted. Since Odonic made the donation without being in actual control of the area, the Kołbacz monks asked for recognition by the Pomeranian duke Barnim I, which was granted in 1237. The Kołbacz monks then started settlement and amelioration of the grant (Ostsiedlung), including the construction of the town of Treben northwest of Sovin, which however was abandoned soon after.

=== Medieval Arnswalde, Choszczno ===
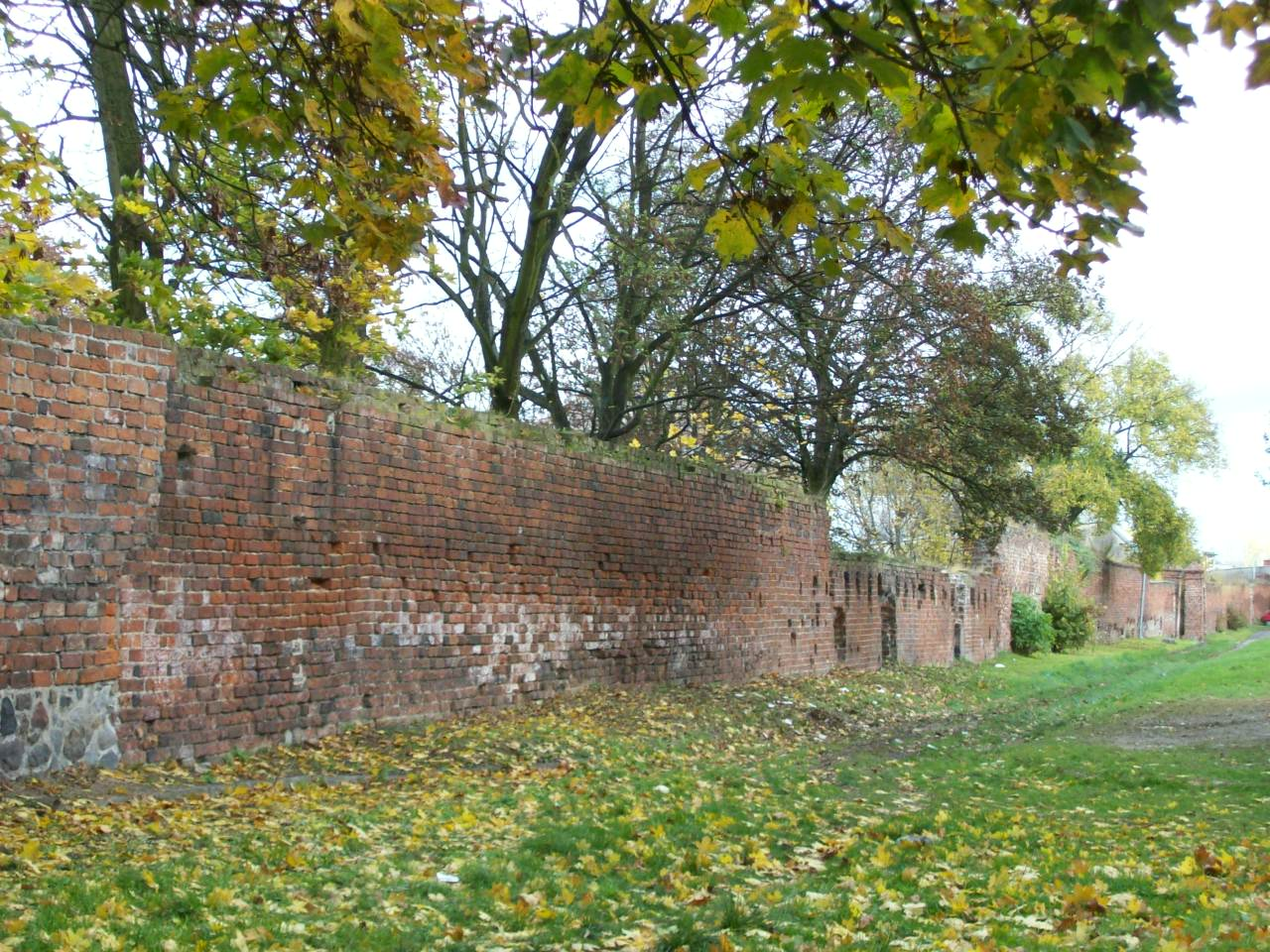
Medieval town wall

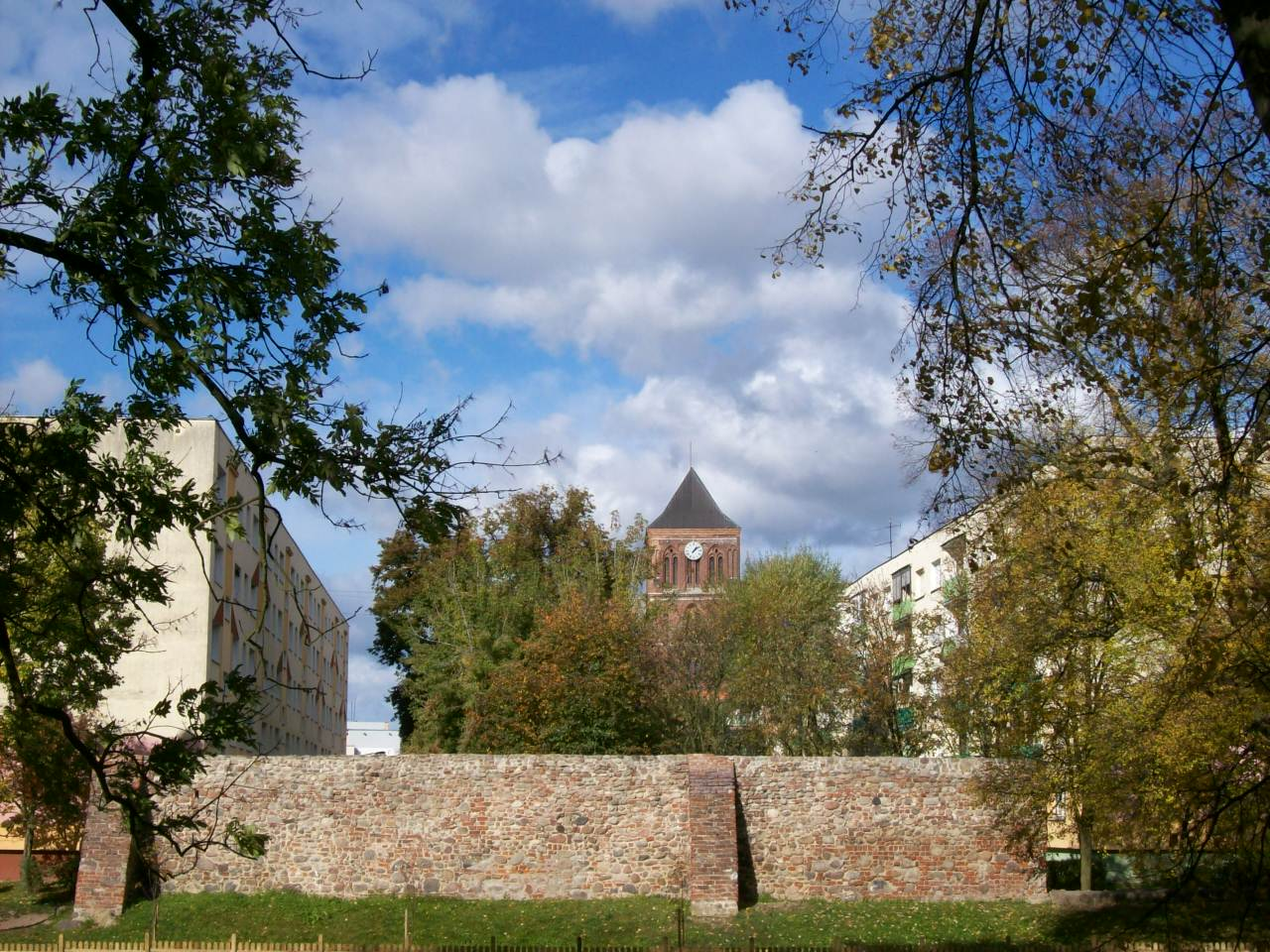
Mediaeval town wall with St. Mary's church in the background

The Brandenburgian margraves, who had established the core of the later New March at the lower Warta, took control of the area between around 1263 and 1269. The margraves' intervention was triggered by a dispute between Barnim and the Order of Saint John: Barnim, unable to pay his debts to the order, refused to hand over territories around Sovin which Albertus Magnus, at the behest of the pope, had selected for compensation. Among those who would have been affected by the transition of these territories was Ludwig von Wedel, an influential magnate who had just changed his allegiance from Barnim toward the margraves. It was most probably he who called the Brandenburgians for help, since they were able to prevent the hand-over through their veto as Barnim's feudal suzerains, a position, contested again and again, they held since 1231/34. While Barnim was excommunicated for his refusal, the margraves took control of the area and renounced Barnim's claim to it, the Wedel family however was assured their possessions.

In this context, the margraves founded the town of Arnswalde east of Sovin, at the site of the modern city center. The name derives from "Arn", a contracted genitive form of German Aar, an antiquated word for eagle (the margravians' heraldic beast); and "Wald(e)", also "Wold(e)", meaning woods or forest.

This town, built between 1269 and 1289, and in the beginning populated with people from Angermünde, was first mentioned in 1269 as the site of the conclusion of the treaty of Arnswalde. The Cistercians were expelled from Sovin, and barred from returning despite multiple respective efforts. The remaining inhabitants of Sovin probably settled in Arnswalde, from where the surrounding area (terra Arnswalde) was henceforth administered. Treben lost its function as a regional central market to Arnswalde. The Arnswalde area remained contested between Barnim I and the Brandenburgian margraves, who had taken from him a large area between the Warta-Noteć line and the lower Ina rivers by 1269. Despite Barnim being married to margrave Otto III's daughter in 1267, Barnim went to war with the margraves over the Arnswalde area between 1273 and 1275. When the dispute was settled in 1278, Barnim recovered the area northwest of Arnswalde, while the town's surroundings and the areas to the south and east remained with the margraves: Arnswalde henceforth was a frontier town near the border between the duchy of Pomerania and Brandenburg's New March. After a war broke out over control of the region in 1319, the town came under control of the Duchy of Pomerania and Duke Wartislaw IV vested it with new privileges, however, by 1326 it fell to Brandenburg again.

Medieval Arnswalde consisted of four districts enclosed by a ring of the city walls and other defensive structures and the surrounding area (154 Hufen by 1455). In a 1307 document, the Order of St. John received the patronage over the church from the margraves, which is the first written record of the church. A regional center of trade and craftsmanship, Arnswalde became one of the larger cities in the New March.

The town is documented as Choszczno in Polish sources from the 15th century.

In 1373 along with the New March the town became part of the Czech Crown Lands under the Luxembourg dynasty. In 1402, the Luxembourgs reached an agreement with Poland in Kraków, according to which Poland was to purchase and re-incorporate the region, but eventually the Luxembourgs pawned it to the Teutonic Order, as a result it was under Teutonic rule from 1402 to 1454/1455. Arnswalde became a center of opposition against the order's rule, and after the council paid tribute to the Polish king in 1433, the city was in political dependence to Poland until 1437. After receiving a guarantee of impunity for siding with Poland, the town fell again under the rule of Teutonic Knights, who, however, did not respect the agreement and carried out executions among the local populace. In 1443, during a rebellion against the order, the order erected a castle in the town that served as the seat of a local administrator. The castle was levelled when the order's rule ended in 1454, when the Teutonic Knights sold it to Brandenburg in order to raise funds for war against Poland. During the war, the town was mentioned in the chronicles of Jan Długosz as Harnsswald alias Choschczno.

Since 1472, the district surrounding the town was administered by a Brandenburgian landvogt residing in Arnswalde.

Historical population
Year	Pop.	±%
1750	1,910	—
1850	2,440	+27.7%
1850	5,450	+123.4%
1875	6,853	+25.7%
1880	7,358	+7.4%
1890	7,507	+2.0%
1925	10,911	+45.3%
1933	11,786	+8.0%
1939	12,725	+8.0%
2021	14,831	+16.6%

Throughout the 16th and early 17th centuries, Arnswalde prospered. By population, it was the second-largest town in the New March during the late 16th century. In the early 17th century, four markets were regularly held for craft products and an additional one for horses. However, during the Thirty Years' War, the town was stricken by plagues and destroyed by fires and warfare. Less than 500 people remained in the ruined town by 1649, and Arnswalde lost its pre-war importance.

=== Kingdom of Prussia ===
Stability occurred once Arnswalde became part of the Kingdom of Prussia, and a permanent garrison was stationed in the town from 1719. In this period the town advanced economically and socially with the establishment of a new postal route to Stargard. The 18th century again brought difficulties, and the town experienced a number of tragedies caused by the plague, the worst in 1800 when 65 children died.

The 19th century was a great time for the development of Arnswalde. It was linked by railway with Stettin and Posen (Szczecin and Poznań) in 1848 and later with Berlin. Since now mass public transportation could be realized at lower costs, a new tourist industry was established in the town. The microclimate in the region drew in weekend tourists from as far as Berlin and Brandenburg, and the new hospital next to the lake catered for convalescing patients. The railway was also a catalyst for the local manufacturing industry as it provided an affordable transport of goods to the Port of Stettin (Szczecin), because of this a brewery and a textile industry flourished.

In 1905 a new hospital was opened and was situated on the bank of lake Klückensee (since 1945 called Lake Klukom). The First World War had little effect on Arnswalde, but the post-war German depression damaged the tourist economy. In the framework of the demilitarisation of post-war Germany the garrison was disbanded, but in 1938 it was reinstated.

=== World War II ===
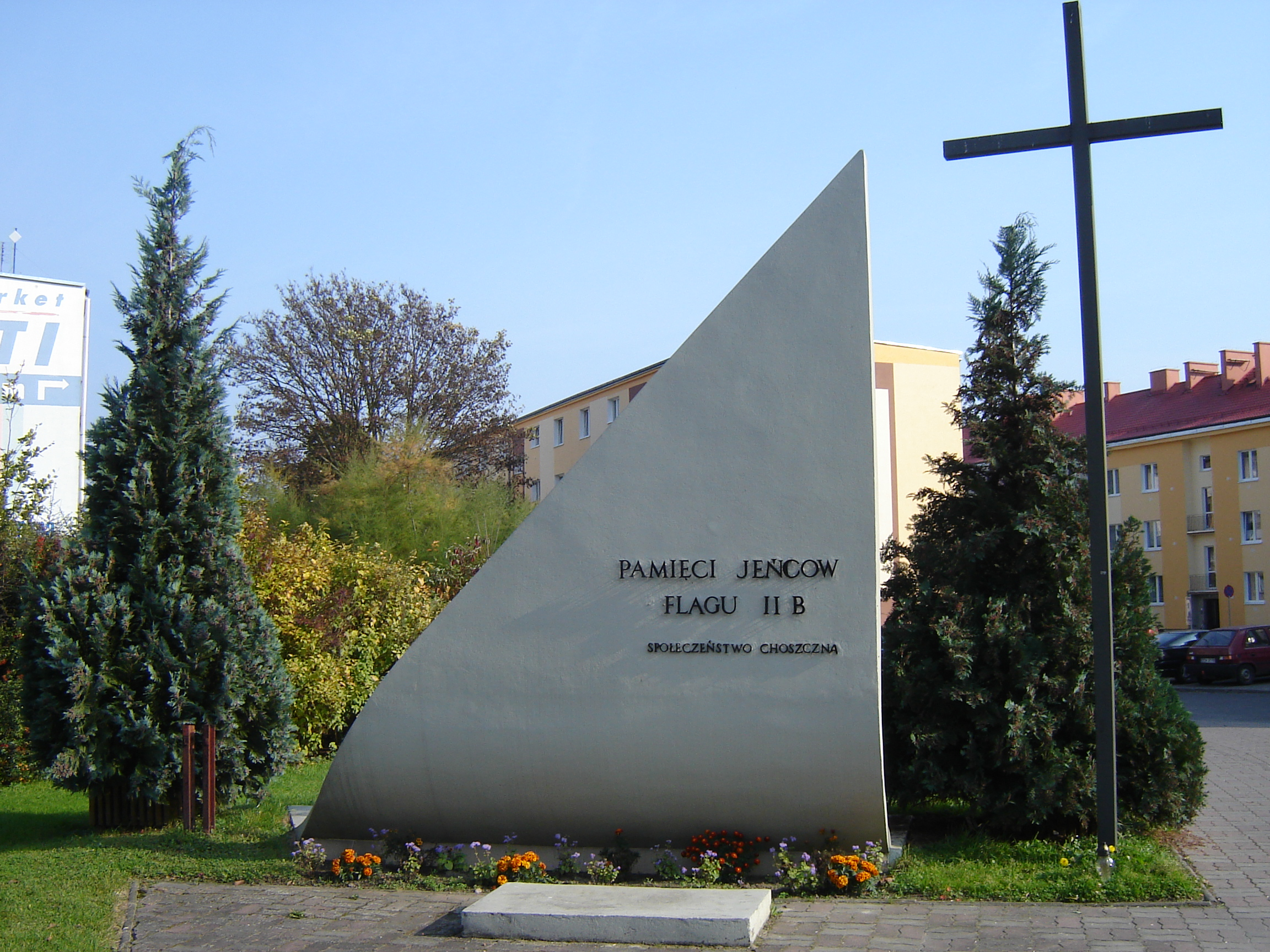
Monument commemorating the prisoners of the German POW camp Oflag II B

In 1939, soon after the beginning of Second World War, the prisoner of war camp Oflag II B was established on the outskirts of the town. At the beginning, the majority of the prisoners were Polish and French. Among the prisoners were officer Henryk Sucharski, writer Leon Kruczkowski and Olympic athlete Zygmunt Weiss. The Poles were used in the town as slave labor by the Germans.

With the collapse of the German eastern front during the Red Army's Vistula–Oder offensive of 1945, Arnswalde was on the front line. Because of the town's strategic position of protecting Stargard and Stettin seaport, a strong German garrison had been concentrated in the town to defend it. During the Russian offensive bitter fighting occurred, which resulted in damage to almost 80% of the town's infrastructure. The town's population fled westwards before and during the battle. After the German resistance stopped on 23 February 1945, Arnswalde was handed over to the Poles for administration as a part of the Recovered Territories.

The town was mainly repopulated by Polish expellees from the Polish territories lost to the Soviet Union, now part of Lithuania, Belarus, and Ukraine—the former Kresy. It was initially renamed as Choczno, later as Choczen in 1945. It was finally renamed to the historic Polish "Choszczno" on 7 May 1946.

=== Post-war Poland ===
Medieval landmarks of Choszczno

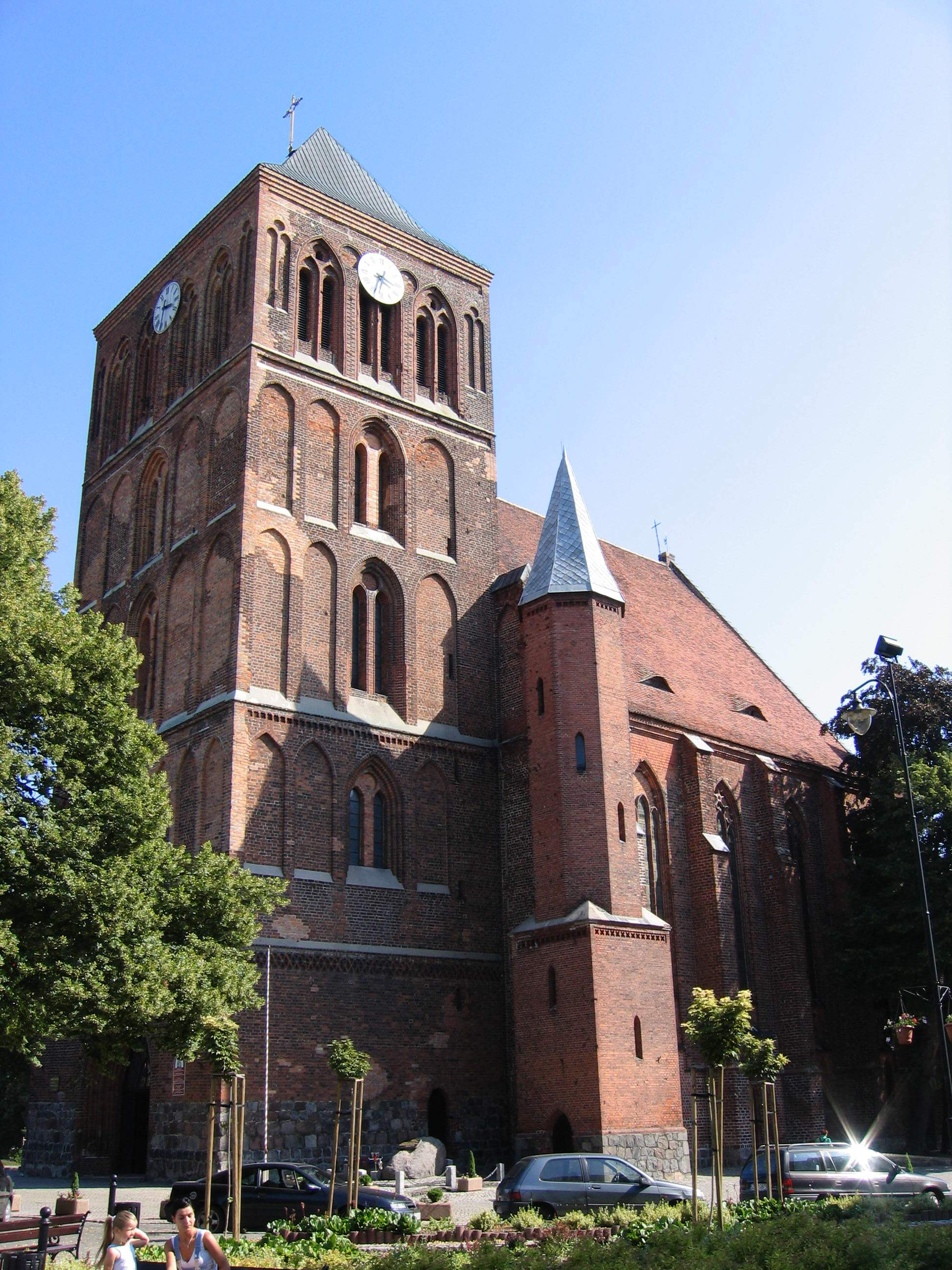
St. Mary's church

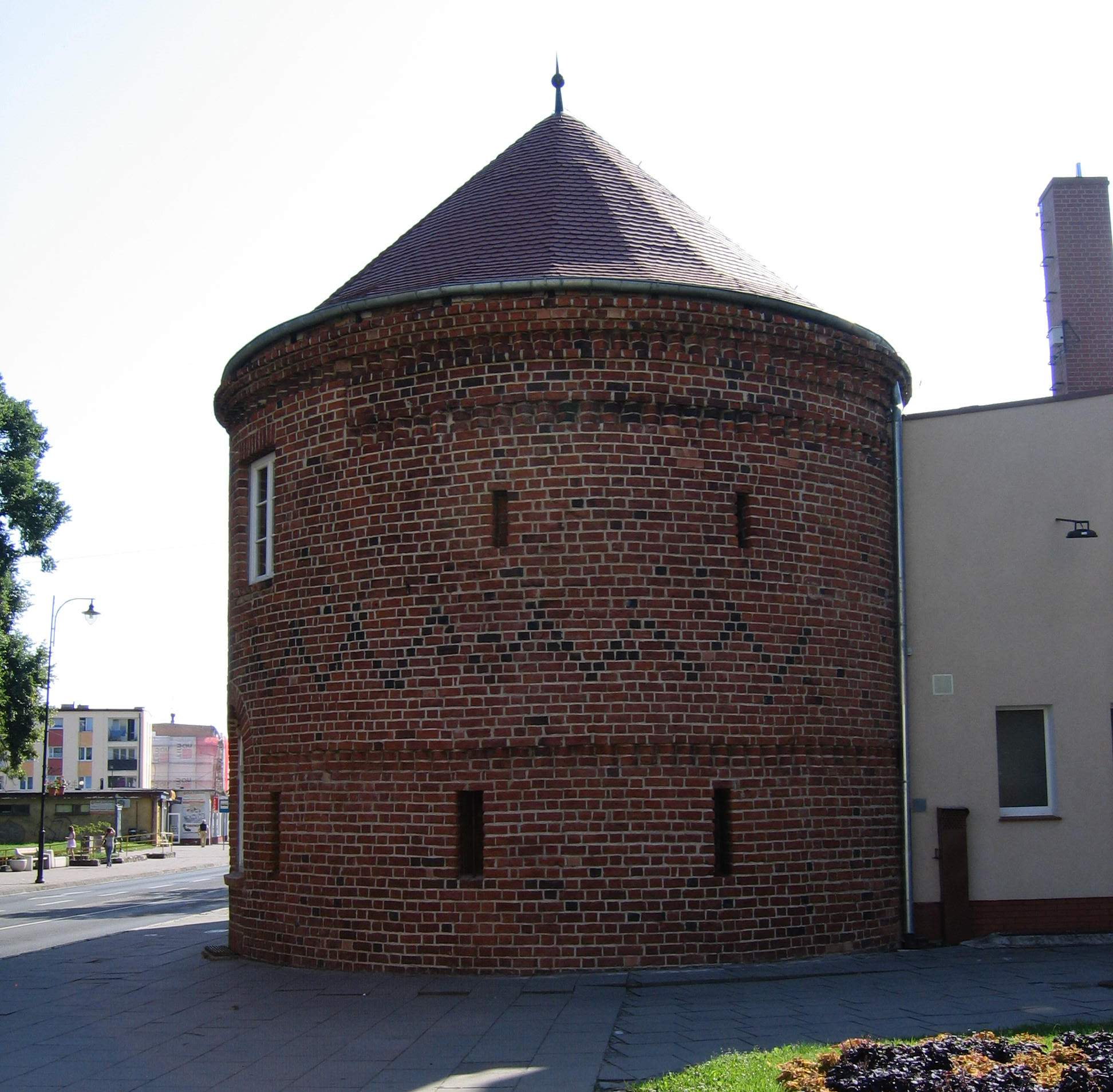
Stone Gate tower

The first Polish institution to send its representatives to the town after the war was the Polish State Railways. In 1946 the first Polish education institution the "Bolesław Krzywousty" high school was opened. Due to the damage sustained by the town, the majority of the burnt-out buildings were dismantled and the reclaimed bricks were sent for the rebuilding of Warsaw, destroyed by the Germans. Only after 1956, when the territory situation seemed to be clarified, the process of rebuilding started properly and investment by the Polish government begun. Due to the population growth the local government invested in new housing, and in 1959 the first newly built housing block was completed. The rebuilding continued and the majority of the architecture is now post 1950s. In the 1990s the local government started investing in sporting facilities (an indoor swimming pool, sports arena, tennis courts) to promote active tourism.

Starting with its partnership with Fürstenwalde in 1978, the local government has been active in fostering foreign co-operation and the creation of links with different sister cities.

In 1984 Choszczno celebrated 700 years since its foundation. The traditional annual Days of Choszczno festival is held during the first weekend of June.

== Transport ==
Choszczno lies on the junction of voivodeship roads 175, 160 and 151.

Choszczno has a station on the Szczecin-Poznań railway line.

== Notable residents ==
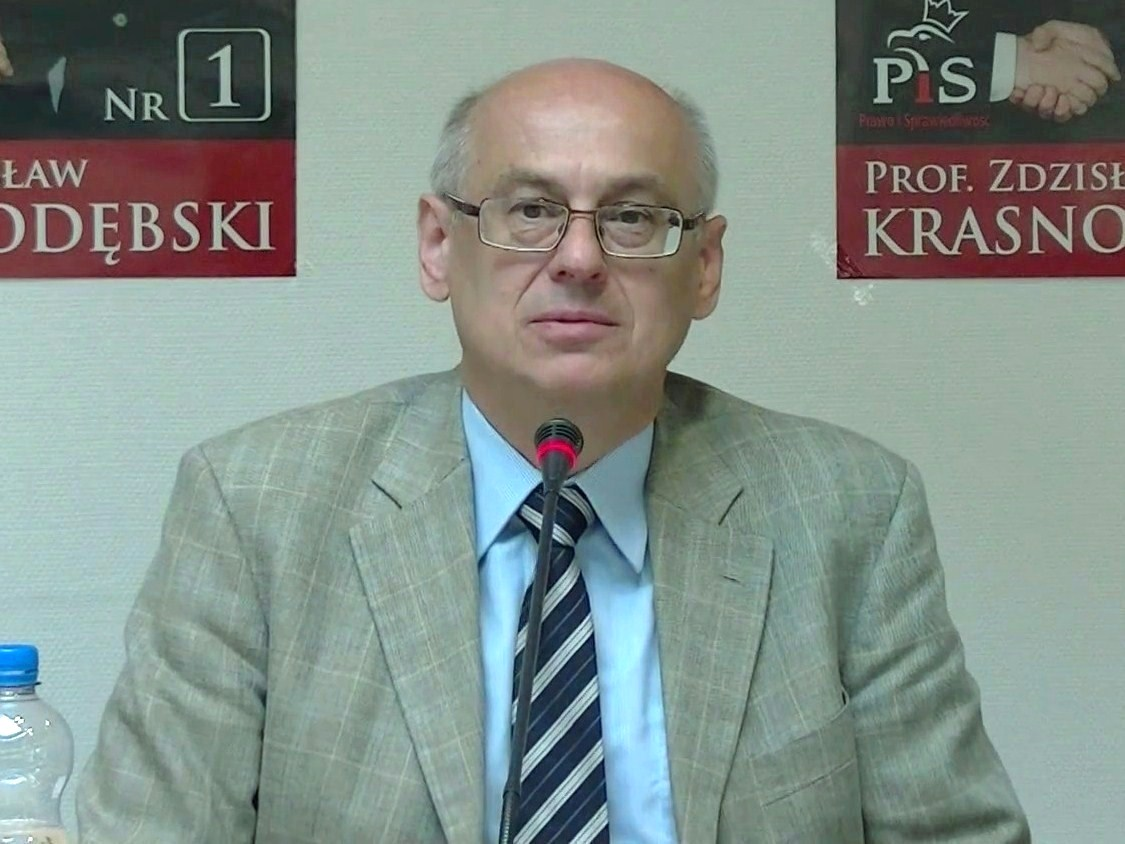
Zdzisław Krasnodębski, 2014

- Robert Ferdinand Wilms (1824–1880), German surgeon
- Wilhelm Fliess (1858–1928), German Jewish otolaryngologist, theorised about human biorhythms
- Mortimer von Kessel (1893–1981), German general in the Wehrmacht during WWII
- Horst Tietzen (1912–1940), Luftwaffe pilot
- Franz Eisenach (1918–1998), Luftwaffe pilot
- Wilhelm Lemke (1920–1943), Luftwaffe pilot
- Günter Lörke (born 1935), German cyclist, Team Time Trial silver medallist at the 1960 Summer Olympics
- Christina Thürmer-Rohr, (1936-2026), scientist
- Axel Gehrke (1942–2021), German politician
- Zdzisław Krasnodębski (born 1953), Polish sociologist, social philosopher and MEP since 2014
- Mieczysław Gocuł (born 1963), Polish General, Chief of General Staff 2013-2017.
- Grzegorz Kaszak (born 1964), Bishop of Sosnowiec
- Jolanta Łukaszewicz (born 1966), Polish sprint canoer, competed in the 1988 Summer Olympics

== Twin towns – sister cities ==
Choszczno is twinned with:

- Fürstenwalde, Germany
- Ovruch, Ukraine
