= Choszczno County =

Choszczno County Powiat choszczeński
- County
- Flag Coat of arms

- Location within the voivodeship

- Division into gminas
- Coordinates (Choszczno): 53°10′N 15°24′E
- Country: Poland
- Voivodeship: West Pomeranian
- Seat: Choszczno
- Gminas: Total 6: Gmina Bierzwnik; Gmina Choszczno; Gmina Drawno; Gmina Krzęcin; Gmina Pełczyce; Gmina Recz

Area
  - Total: 1,327.95 km^{2} (512.72 sq mi)

Population (2006)
  - Total: 50,066
  - Density: 37.702/km^{2} (97.647/sq mi)
  - Urban: 23,845
  - Rural: 26,221
- Car plates: ZCH
- Website: www.powiatchoszczno.pl

Choszczno County (Polish: powiat choszczeński) is a unit of territorial administration and local government (powiat) in West Pomeranian Voivodeship, north-western Poland. It came into being on January 1, 1999, as a result of the Polish local government reforms passed in 1998. Its administrative seat and largest town is Choszczno, which lies 62 kilometres (39 mi) south-east of the regional capital Szczecin. The county contains three other towns: Recz, 15 km (9 mi) north-east of Choszczno, Pełczyce, 16 km (10 mi) south-west of Choszczno, and Drawno, 24 km (15 mi) east of Choszczno.

The county covers an area of 1,327.95 square kilometres (512.7 sq mi). As of 2006 its total population is 50,066, out of which the population of Choszczno is 15,753, that of Recz is 2,995, that of Pełczyce is 2,698, that of Drawno is 2,399, and the rural population is 26,221.

The county includes the lake districts of Pojezierze Choszczeńskie, Pojezierze Myśliborskie, Pojezierze Ińskie and Równina Drawska. Within Gmina Drawno is a large forest (Puszcza Drawska) which is part of the Drawno National Park.

== Neighbouring counties ==
Choszczno County is bordered by Drawsko County to the north, Wałcz County to the east, Strzelce-Drezdenko County to the south, Myślibórz County to the south-west and Stargard County to the north-west.

== Administrative divisions ==
The county is subdivided into six gminas (four urban-rural and two rural). These are listed in the following table, in descending order of population.

Gmina	Type	Area (km^{2})	Population (2006)	Seat
Gmina Choszczno	urban-rural	246.5	22,263	Choszczno
Gmina Pełczyce	urban-rural	200.8	8,100	Pełczyce
Gmina Recz	urban-rural	180.1	5,740	Recz
Gmina Drawno	urban-rural	321.1	5,340	Drawno
Gmina Bierzwnik	rural	238.9	4,813	Bierzwnik
Gmina Krzęcin	rural	140.5	3,810	Krzęcin

== Transport ==
=== Railways ===
- in use: Szczecin Gł. - Poznań Gł. (through Choszczno and Bierzwnik).
- unused, existing: Stargard Szczeciński - Piła Główna (through Recz Pomorski) and Barlinek - Kalisz Pomorski (through Pełczyce, Lubiana Pyrzycka, Choszczno and Drawno).
- unused, non-existing: Lubiana Pyrzycka - Strzelce Krajeńskie.

=== Roads ===
- national grade: 10: Lubieszyn - Płońsk (through Recz).
- voivodship grade: 151: Recz - Świdwin, 155: Recz - Gorzów Wielkopolski (through Choszczno and Pełczyce), 160: Suchań - Miedzichowo (through Choszczno and Bierzwnik), 161: Choszczno - Kalisz Pomorski (through Drawno), 122: Piasecznik - Krajnik Dolny.
