= Wężnik =

- Village
- Location within Poland
- Coordinates: 53°5′37″N 15°25′44″E
- Country: Poland
- Voivodeship: West Pomeranian
- County: Choszczno
- Gmina: Krzęcin

Wężnik ([ˈvɛ̃ʐnik]; German: Hammermühle) is a village in the administrative district of Gmina Krzęcin, within Choszczno County, West Pomeranian Voivodeship, in north-western Poland. It lies approximately 4 km (2 mi) west of Krzęcin, 9 km (6 mi) south of Choszczno, and 67 km (42 mi) south-east of the regional capital Szczecin. It had less than 10 inhabitants in 2007.

Whilst it was a part of Germany it was called Hammermühle, meaning 'hammer mill', signifying that a workshop or forge likely used to exist here along the Mała Ina.

For the history of the region, see History of Pomerania.

== Geography ==
The Wężnik forest makes up one of the 8 districts of the Choszczno Forest District. The forest contains lakes, outwash deposits, and a 3.5 km (2 mi) educational trail created in 2001, with information boards, a firepit, and equipment for sports including a volleyball net and a balance beam.
