= Rakowo =

Rakowo may refer to the following places:

- Rakowo, Kuyavian-Pomeranian Voivodeship (north-central Poland)
- Rakowo, Płock County in Masovian Voivodeship (east-central Poland)
- Rakowo, Podlaskie Voivodeship (north-east Poland)
- Rakowo, Płońsk County in Masovian Voivodeship (east-central Poland)
- Rakowo, Gniezno County in Greater Poland Voivodeship (west-central Poland)
- Rakowo, Konin County in Greater Poland Voivodeship (west-central Poland)
- Rakowo, Wągrowiec County in Greater Poland Voivodeship (west-central Poland)
- Rakowo, Lubusz Voivodeship (west Poland)
- Rakowo, Pomeranian Voivodeship (north Poland)
- Rakowo, Warmian-Masurian Voivodeship (north Poland)
- Rakowo, Choszczno County in West Pomeranian Voivodeship (north-west Poland)
- Rakowo, Szczecinek County in West Pomeranian Voivodeship (north-west Poland)
