= Pęzino Castle =

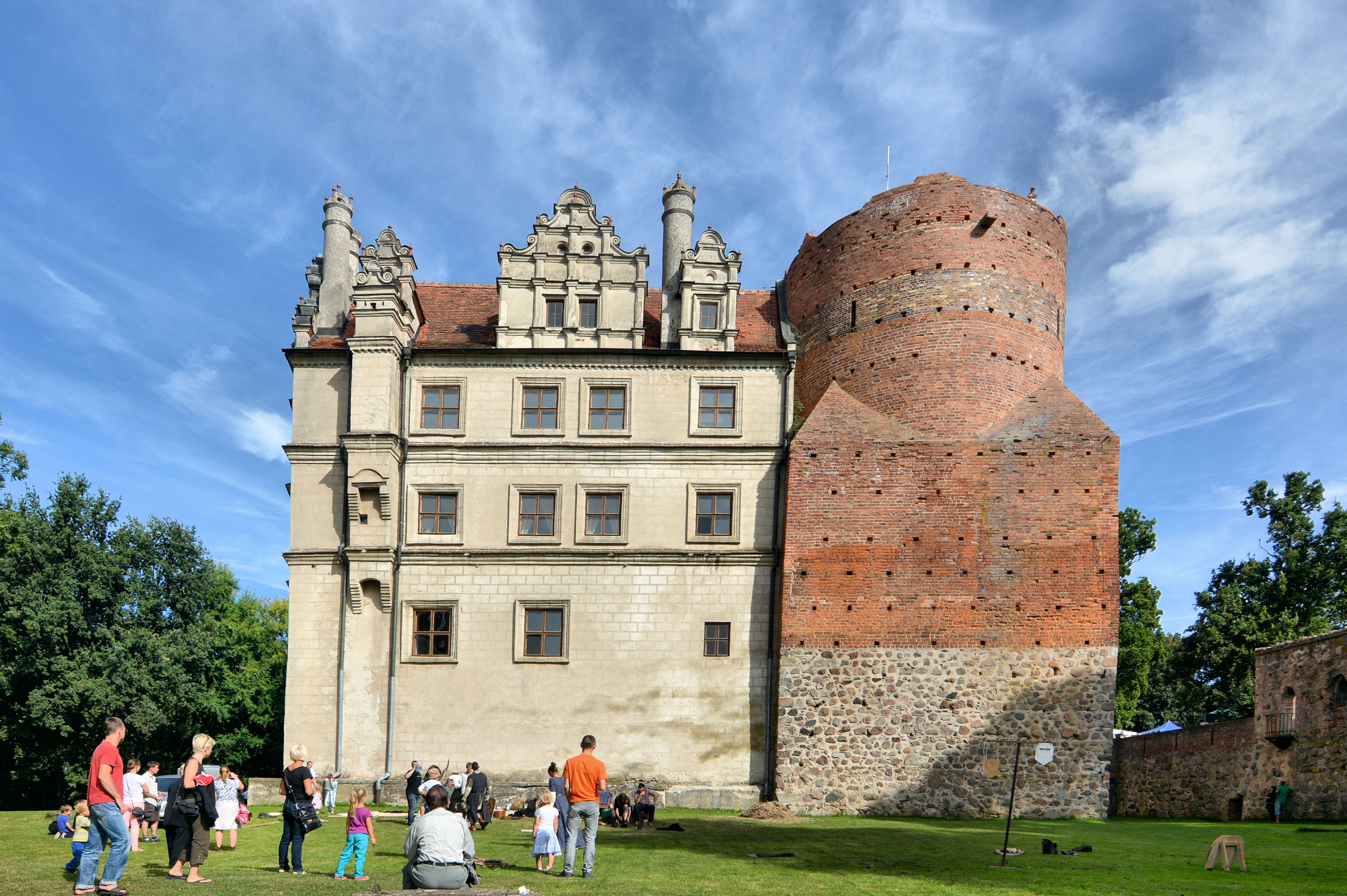
- Pęzino Castle

- Location of the Castle of the Pęzino Castle in Poland
- 53°20′24″N 15°11′31″E
- Location: Pęzino, West Pomeranian Voivodeship in Poland

History
- Built: 1382

Site notes
- Architectural styles: Gothic, Renaissance, Gothic Revival

Pęzino Castle is a castle located in centre of the village of Pęzino, West Pomeranian Voivodeship, in Poland. The castle is located by the River Krąpiel and its tributary River Pęzinka. Currently, the castle is privately owned, its owner uses the stronghold primarily for hosting events, conferences and wedding celebrations.

== History ==
The castle was raised by the Knights of Malta, which since 1382 had owned the castle - seeded to their ownership by the Borko family. The castle has had a strategic location, being located in between the two rivers of Krąpiel and Pęzinka. The stronghold was built on an artificial hill, and its layout characteristics are similar to the nearby castles in Łagowo and Swobnica, with a four-part fortification wall surrounding an irregular courtyard which is linked up with the walls by living quarters, connected to the west of the fortification wall. The living quarters had windows only on the interior side of the castle to the courtyard.

In 1492, the castle was seeded as a feud to the Borko family from the Knights of Malta. The Borko family did not change the castle greatly apart from adding windows in the western fortification walls and adding gables to the living quarters. In 1600, the castle undergone extensive works adding a three floor living quarters, connected to the fortification walls. The castle was plastered and covered with bossage.

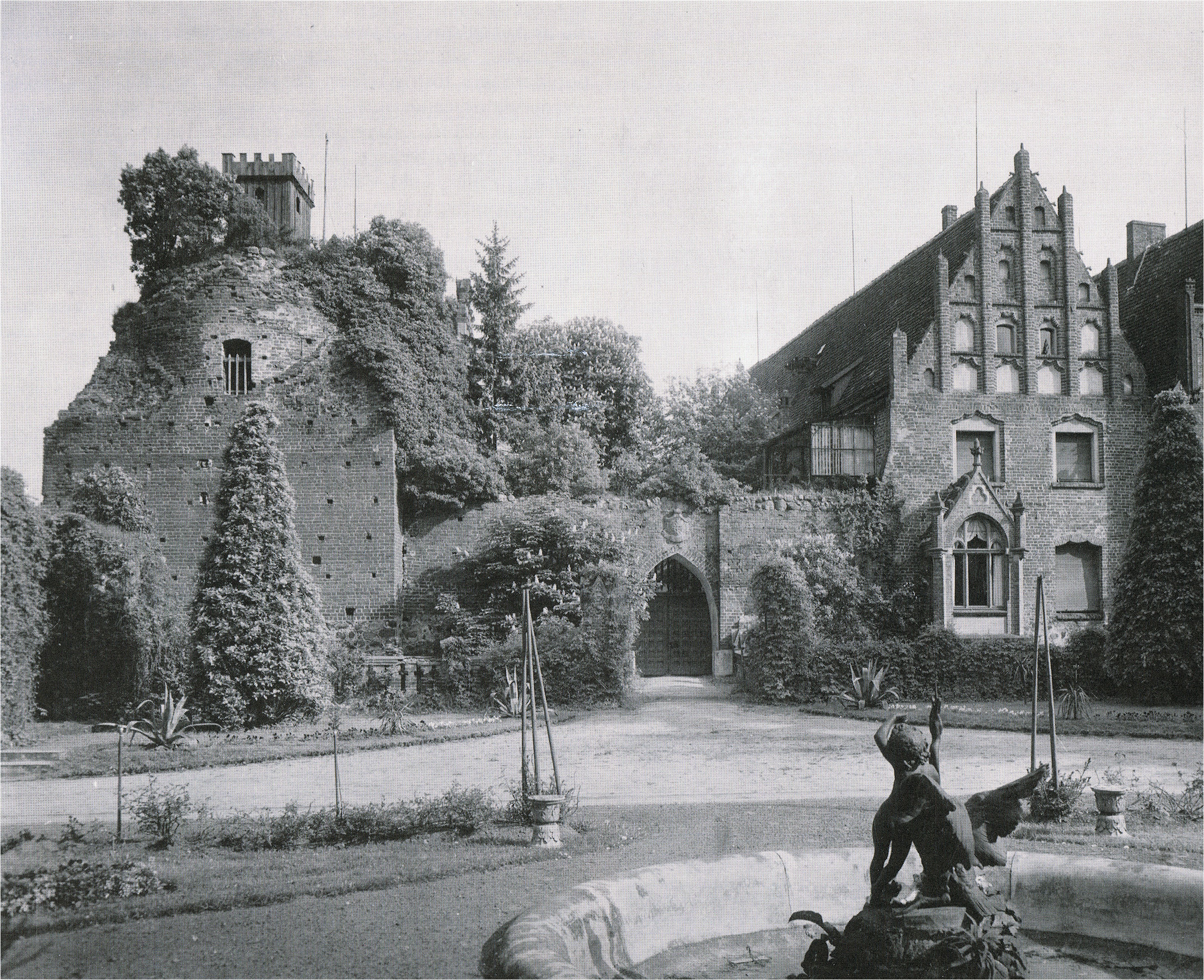
Castle in c. 1920

Since 1680, the castle was appointed to the Puttkamer family, which became the castle's owners in 1703. In the mid-nineteenth century, a new wing has been built in the Neo-Gothic style. In the 1860s the Puttkamer family deconstructed the outhouses around the castle, and in its place built gardens and a pavilion by the ruin of a chapel.

In 1935, a fire had devastated the eastern-wing of the castle. In 1936–1940, the castle was renovated and an additional gatehouse wing was built. After World War II, the castle was seized by the State Agricultural Farm in Pęzino. The castle began to slowly deteriorate. The renovation of the castle began in 1977 to 1990. The castle was sold by the State Agriculture Treasury in 1996 to a company called Rolmłyn.

== See also ==
- Castles in Poland
