= Pęzinka =

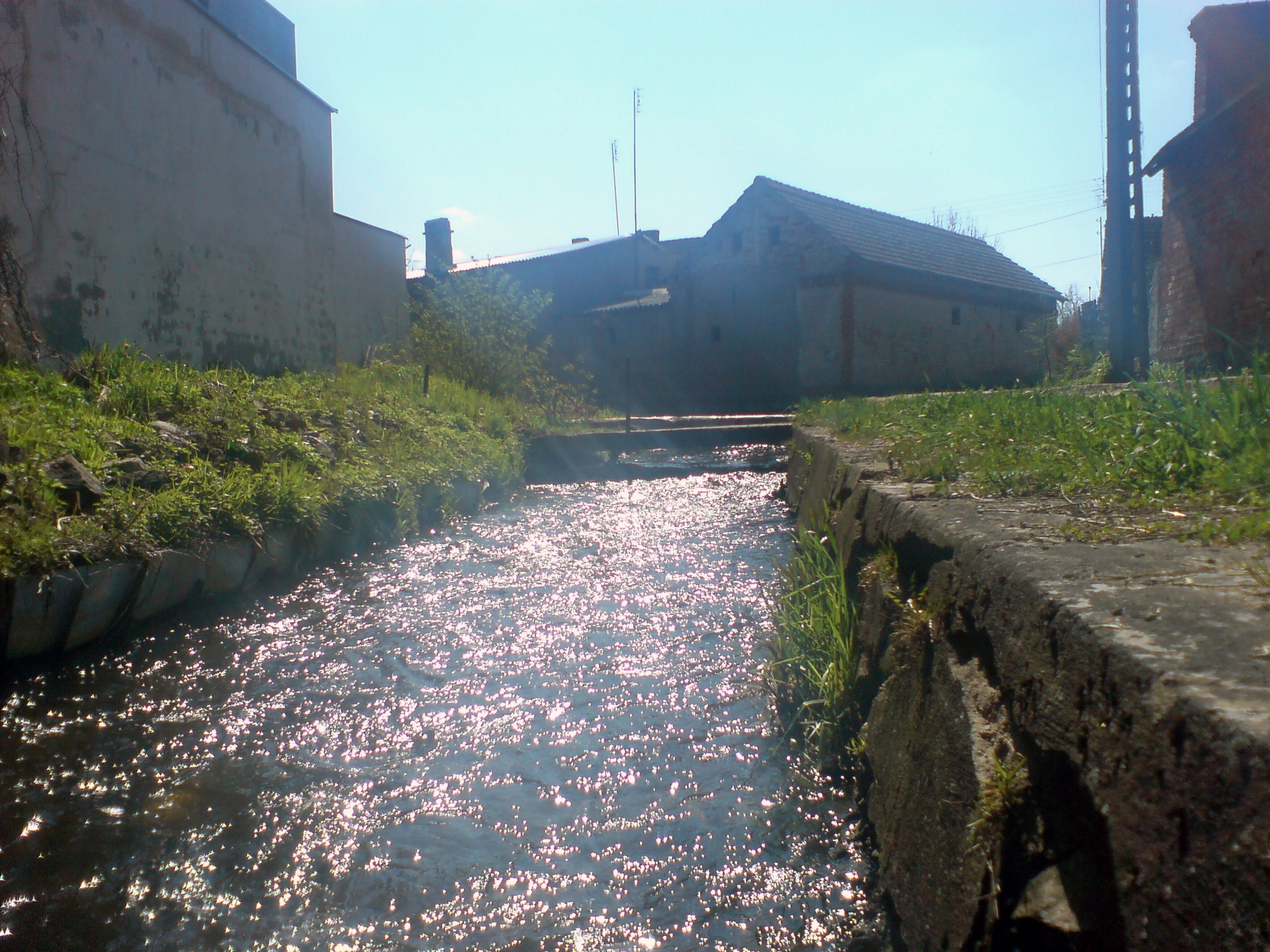
- Pęzinka in Dobrzany

Location
- Country: Poland

Physical characteristics
- Mouth
  - location: Krępiel
  - coordinates: 53.3395°N 15.1935°E
- Length: 28.78 km

Basin features
- Progression: Krępiel→ Ina→ Oder→ Baltic Sea

Pęzinka is a 28.78 km long river in Poland, tributary of the Krępiel. It flows through the Stargard County, passing through the towns of Dobrzany, Barzkowice, Sulino, and Pęzino, all in the West Pomeranian Voivodeship.
