= Kolonia IV Chłopowo =

- Settlement
- Location within Poland
- Coordinates: 53°3′0″N 15°30′27″E
- Country: Poland
- Voivodeship: West Pomeranian
- County: Choszczno
- Gmina: Krzęcin

Kolonia IV Chłopowo is a settlement in the administrative district of Gmina Krzęcin, within Choszczno County, West Pomeranian Voivodeship, in north-western Poland. It lies approximately 5 km (3 mi) south-east of Krzęcin, 15 km (9 mi) south-east of Choszczno, and 74 km (46 mi) south-east of the regional capital Szczecin.

For the history of the region, see History of Pomerania.
