= Żeńsko =

Żeńsko may refer to the following places in West Pomeranian Voivodeship, Poland:

- Nowe Żeńsko
- Żeńsko, Choszczno County
- Żeńsko, Drawsko County
