= Kolonia V Chłopowo =

- Settlement
- Location within Poland
- Coordinates: 53°2′46″N 15°29′54″E
- Country: Poland
- Voivodeship: West Pomeranian
- County: Choszczno
- Gmina: Krzęcin

Kolonia V Chłopowo is a settlement in the administrative district of Gmina Krzęcin, within Choszczno County, West Pomeranian Voivodeship, in north-western Poland. It lies approximately 5 km (3 mi) south of Krzęcin, 15 km (9 mi) south-east of Choszczno, and 74 km (46 mi) south-east of the regional capital Szczecin.

For the history of the region, see History of Pomerania.
