= Potoczna =

- Village
- Location within Poland
- Coordinates: 53°5′29″N 15°24′3″E
- Country: Poland
- Voivodeship: West Pomeranian
- County: Choszczno
- Gmina: Krzęcin

Potoczna [pɔˈtɔt͡ʂna] is a village in the administrative district of Gmina Krzęcin, within Choszczno County, West Pomeranian Voivodeship, in north-western Poland. It lies approximately 6 km (4 mi) west of Krzęcin, 9 km (6 mi) south of Choszczno, and 66 km (41 mi) south-east of the regional capital Szczecin.

For the history of the region, see History of Pomerania.
