= Sobieradz, Choszczno County =

Sobieradz
- Village
- Location within Poland
- Coordinates: 53°3′54″N 15°23′49″E
- Country: Poland
- Voivodeship: West Pomeranian
- County: Choszczno
- Gmina: Krzęcin

Sobieradz [sɔˈbjɛrat͡s] is a village in the administrative district of Gmina Krzęcin, within Choszczno County, West Pomeranian Voivodeship, in north-western Poland. It lies approximately 7 km (4 mi) west of Krzęcin, 12 km (7 mi) south of Choszczno, and 67 km (42 mi) south-east of the regional capital Szczecin.

For the history of the region, see History of Pomerania.
