= Wyszyna =

Wyszyna may refer to the following places:

- Wyszyna, Greater Poland Voivodeship (west-central Poland)
- Wyszyna, Masovian Voivodeship (east-central Poland)
- Wyszyna, Choszczno County in West Pomeranian Voivodeship (north-west Poland)
- Wyszyna, Myślibórz County in West Pomeranian Voivodeship (north-west Poland)
