= Sobolewo, West Pomeranian Voivodeship =

Sobolewo
- Village
- Location within Poland
- Coordinates: 53°3′51″N 15°29′48″E
- Country: Poland
- Voivodeship: West Pomeranian
- County: Choszczno
- Gmina: Krzęcin

Sobolewo ([sɔbɔˈlɛvɔ]; German: Ludwigswunsch) is a village in the administrative district of Gmina Krzęcin, within Choszczno County, West Pomeranian Voivodeship, in north-western Poland. It lies approximately 3 km (2 mi) south-east of Krzęcin, 14 km (9 mi) south-east of Choszczno, and 73 km (45 mi) south-east of the regional capital Szczecin.

For the history of the region, see History of Pomerania.
