= Kaszewo =

- Village
- Location within Poland
- Coordinates: 53°7′N 15°34′E
- Country: Poland
- Voivodeship: West Pomeranian
- County: Choszczno
- Gmina: Krzęcin
- Population: 260

Kaszewo ([kaˈʂɛvɔ]; German: Heinrichswalde) is a village in the administrative district of Gmina Krzęcin, within Choszczno County, West Pomeranian Voivodeship, in north-western Poland. It lies approximately 7 km (4 mi) north-east of Krzęcin, 13 km (8 mi) south-east of Choszczno, and 74 km (46 mi) south-east of the regional capital Szczecin.

For the history of the region, see History of Pomerania.

The village has a population of 260.
