= Hubert Graczyk =

Polish footballer (born 2003)

Personal information
- Date of birth: 28 February 2003 (age 23)
- Place of birth: Skwierzyna, Poland
- Height: 6 ft 4 in (1.92 m)
- Position: Goalkeeper

Team information
- Current team: Berkhamsted

Youth career
- 2017: Everton
- 2017–2024: Arsenal
- 2024–2025: Manchester United

Senior career*
Years	Team	Apps	(Gls)
2023–2024	Arsenal	0	(0)
2023	→ Slough Town (loan)	4	(0)
2024–2025	Manchester United	0	(0)
2025	Wealdstone	0	(0)
2025–2026	Enfield Town	4	(0)
2026	Berkhamsted	2	(0)
2026	Carshalton Athletic	10	(0)
2026–	Berkhamsted	0	(0)

International career
2019	England U16	2	(0)
2019	England U17	1	(0)
2019–2021	England U18	2	(0)
- * Club domestic league appearances and goals as of 12:15, 25 July 2026 (UTC)

Hubert Graczyk (born 28 February 2003) is a professional footballer who plays as a goalkeeper for Southern League Premier Division South club Berkhamsted. Born in Poland, he has represented England internationally at youth level.

== Early life ==
Graczyk was born on 28 February 2003 in Skwierzyna, Poland. The son of a father from Kłodawa and a mother from Trzebiszewo, he moved with his family to England at the age of two.

== Club career ==
Graczyk joined the youth academy of English Premier League side Everton at the age of fourteen. In 2017, he joined the youth academy of English Premier League side Arsenal, where he started his senior career. On 28 February 2021, he signed his first professional contract with the club. Subsequently, he was sent on loan to English side Slough Town in 2023. One year later, he joined the youth academy of English Premier League side Manchester United.

In October 2025, Graczyk joined National League club Wealdstone.

On 19 December 2025, Graczyk moved to National League South side Enfield Town. After making four appearances, he left in mid-January 2026 to join Southern League club Berkhamsted. He joined Carshalton Athletic on 27 February 2026.

In July 2026, it was announced he has re-signed for Southern League Premier Division side Berkhamsted.

== Career statistics ==
As of match played 25 April 2026

Appearances and goals by club, season and competition
Club	Season	League			FA Cup		EFL Cup		Other		Total	
Club	Season	Division	Apps	Goals	Apps	Goals	Apps	Goals	Apps	Goals	Apps	Goals
Arsenal U21	2022–23	—			—		—		2 (Note: Appearance(s) in EFL Trophy)	0	2	0
Slough Town (loan)	2023–24	National League South	4	0	0	0	—		0	0	4	0
Wealdstone	2025–26	National League	0	0	0	0	—		2 (Note: Appearance(s) in National League Cup)	0	2	0
Enfield Town	2025–26	National League South	4	0	0	0	—		0	0	4	0
Berkhamsted	2025–26	Southern League Premier Division South	2	0	0	0	—		0	0	2	0
Carshalton Athletic	2025–26	Isthmian League Premier Division	10	0	0	0	—		0	0	10	0
Career total			20	0	0	0	0	0	4	0	24	0
