= Granowo, West Pomeranian Voivodeship =

Granowo
- Village
- Location within Poland
- Coordinates: 53°4′N 15°26′E
- Country: Poland
- Voivodeship: West Pomeranian
- County: Choszczno
- Gmina: Krzęcin

Granowo ([ɡraˈnɔvɔ]; German: Granow) is a village in the administrative district of Gmina Krzęcin, within Choszczno County, West Pomeranian Voivodeship, in north-western Poland. It lies approximately 4 km (2 mi) south-west of Krzęcin, 12 km (7 mi) south of Choszczno, and 69 km (43 mi) south-east of the regional capital Szczecin.

For the history of the region, see History of Pomerania.
