= Sierosławiec =

- Village
- Location within Poland
- Coordinates: 53°3′24″N 15°29′30″E
- Country: Poland
- Voivodeship: West Pomeranian
- County: Choszczno
- Gmina: Krzęcin

Sierosławiec [ɕɛrɔˈswavjɛt͡s] is a village in the administrative district of Gmina Krzęcin, within Choszczno County, West Pomeranian Voivodeship, in north-western Poland. It lies approximately 4 km (2 mi) south of Krzęcin, 14 km (9 mi) south-east of Choszczno, and 73 km (45 mi) south-east of the regional capital Szczecin.

For the history of the region, see History of Pomerania.
