= Chłopowo, Choszczno County =

Chłopowo
- Village
- Location within Poland
- Coordinates: 53°2′N 15°32′E
- Country: Poland
- Voivodeship: West Pomeranian
- County: Choszczno
- Gmina: Krzęcin

Chłopowo ([xwɔˈpɔvɔ]; German: Schwachenwalde) is a village in the administrative district of Gmina Krzęcin, within Choszczno County, West Pomeranian Voivodeship, in north-western Poland. It lies approximately 7 km (4 mi) south-east of Krzęcin, 18 km (11 mi) south-east of Choszczno, and 77 km (48 mi) south-east of the regional capital Szczecin.

For the history of the region, see History of Pomerania.
