= Ligwiąca =

- Settlement
- Location within Poland
- Coordinates: 53°0′37″N 15°27′54″E
- Country: Poland
- Voivodeship: West Pomeranian
- County: Choszczno
- Gmina: Krzęcin

Ligwiąca [liɡˈvjɔnt͡sa] is a settlement in the administrative district of Gmina Krzęcin, within Choszczno County, West Pomeranian Voivodeship, in north-western Poland. It lies approximately 9 km (6 mi) south of Krzęcin, 18 km (11 mi) south of Choszczno, and 75 km (47 mi) south-east of the regional capital Szczecin.

For the history of the region, see History of Pomerania.
