= Klukom =

Klukom may refer to the following places in Choszczno County, West Pomeranian Voivodeship, Poland:

- Nowy Klukom
- Stary Klukom
