= Sowiniec, West Pomeranian Voivodeship =

Sowiniec
- Village
- Location within Poland
- Coordinates: 53°1′22″N 15°30′41″E
- Country: Poland
- Voivodeship: West Pomeranian
- County: Choszczno
- Gmina: Krzęcin

Sowiniec ([sɔˈviɲɛt͡s]; German: Freudenberg Ost) is a village in the administrative district of Gmina Krzęcin, within Choszczno County, West Pomeranian Voivodeship, in north-western Poland. It lies approximately 7 km (4 mi) south of Krzęcin, 18 km (11 mi) south-east of Choszczno, and 76 km (47 mi) south-east of the regional capital Szczecin.

For the history of the region, see History of Pomerania.
