= Gołąbki (disambiguation) =

Gołąbki are a type of traditional Polish cabbage roll.

Gołąbki may also refer to:

- Gołąbki, Greater Poland Voivodeship (west-central Poland)
- Gołąbki, Kuyavian-Pomeranian Voivodeship (north-central Poland)
- Gołąbki, Lublin Voivodeship (east Poland)
- Gołąbki, Warmian-Masurian Voivodeship (north Poland)
- Gołąbki, Choszczno County in West Pomeranian Voivodeship (north-west Poland)
- Gołąbki, a 14th-century village, now part of Ursus (district in Warsaw)
