= Objezierze, West Pomeranian Voivodeship =

Objezierze
- Village
- Location within Poland
- Coordinates: 53°5′N 15°33′E
- Country: Poland
- Voivodeship: West Pomeranian
- County: Choszczno
- Gmina: Krzęcin
- Population (approx.): 1,000

Objezierze [ɔbjɛˈʑɛʐɛ] (German: Hitzdorf) is a village in the administrative district of Gmina Krzęcin, located within Choszczno County in the West Pomeranian Voivodeship of north-western Poland. It lies approximately 5 km (3 mi) east of Krzęcin, 14 km (9 mi) south-east of Choszczno, and 75 km (47 mi) south-east of the regional capital, Szczecin.

For more information on the region's history, see History of Pomerania.

The village has an approximate population of 1,000.
