= Jezierce =

Jezierce may refer to the following places:

- Jezierce, Lubusz Voivodeship (west Poland)
- Jezierce, Pomeranian Voivodeship (north Poland)
- Jezierce, Warmian-Masurian Voivodeship (north Poland)
