= Mielęcin, Choszczno County =

Mielęcin
- Village
- Location within Poland
- Coordinates: 53°3′15″N 15°28′35″E
- Country: Poland
- Voivodeship: West Pomeranian
- County: Choszczno
- Gmina: Krzęcin

Mielęcin [mjɛˈlɛnt͡ɕin] (formerly German: Marienhof) is a village in the administrative district of Gmina Krzęcin, within Choszczno County, West Pomeranian Voivodeship, in north-western Poland. It lies approximately 4 km (2 mi) south of Krzęcin, 14 km (9 mi) south of Choszczno, and 72 km (45 mi) south-east of the regional capital Szczecin.

For the history of the region, see History of Pomerania.
