= Przybysław, West Pomeranian Voivodeship =

Przybysław
- Village
- Location within Poland
- Coordinates: 53°1′59″N 15°27′16″E
- Country: Poland
- Voivodeship: West Pomeranian
- County: Choszczno
- Gmina: Krzęcin

Przybysław ([pʂɨˈbɨswaf]; German: Sophienhof) is a village in the administrative district of Gmina Krzęcin, within Choszczno County, West Pomeranian Voivodeship, in north-western Poland. It lies approximately 6 km (4 mi) south of Krzęcin, 16 km (10 mi) south of Choszczno, and 72 km (45 mi) south-east of the regional capital Szczecin.

For the history of the region, see History of Pomerania.
