= Grzywacz =

Grzywacz (Polish pronunciation: [ˈɡʐɨvat͡ʂ]) is a Polish surname. Notable people with the surname include:

- Maciek Grzywacz, Polish jazz and classical pianist
- Szlama Grzywacz (1909–1944), Polish member of the French Resistance
- Zbylut Grzywacz (1939–2004), Polish painter, sculptor and graphic artist

== See also ==
- Grzywacz, West Pomeranian Voivodeship, village in Poland
