= Dobrojewo =

Dobrojewo may refer to the following places:

- Dobrojewo, Greater Poland Voivodeship (west-central Poland)
- Dobrojewo, Lubusz Voivodeship (west Poland)
- Dobrojewo, West Pomeranian Voivodeship (north-west Poland)
