= Pluskocin, West Pomeranian Voivodeship =

Pluskocin
- Village
- Location within Poland
- Coordinates: 53°1′N 15°29′E
- Country: Poland
- Voivodeship: West Pomeranian
- County: Choszczno
- Gmina: Krzęcin

Pluskocin ([plusˈkɔt͡ɕin]; German: Freudenberg) is a village in the administrative district of Gmina Krzęcin, within Choszczno County, West Pomeranian Voivodeship, in north-western Poland. It lies approximately 8 km (5 mi) south of Krzęcin, 18 km (11 mi) south of Choszczno, and 75 km (47 mi) south-east of the regional capital Szczecin.

For the history of the region, see History of Pomerania.
