= Smużyk =

- Village
- Location within Poland
- Coordinates: 53°4′50″N 15°28′1″E
- Country: Poland
- Voivodeship: West Pomeranian
- County: Choszczno
- Gmina: Krzęcin

Smużyk [ˈsmuʐɨk] is a village in the administrative district of Gmina Krzęcin, within Choszczno County, West Pomeranian Voivodeship, in north-western Poland. It lies approximately 2 km (1 mi) west of Krzęcin, 11 km (7 mi) south-east of Choszczno, and 70 km (43 mi) south-east of the regional capital Szczecin.

For the history of the region, see History of Pomerania.
