= Prokolno =

- Village
- Location within Poland
- Coordinates: 53°4′27″N 15°31′26″E
- Country: Poland
- Voivodeship: West Pomeranian
- County: Choszczno
- Gmina: Krzęcin

Prokolno ([prɔˈkɔlnɔ]; German: Baumgarten) is a village in the administrative district of Gmina Krzęcin, within Choszczno County, West Pomeranian Voivodeship, in north-western Poland. It lies approximately 3 km (2 mi) east of Krzęcin, 14 km (9 mi) south-east of Choszczno, and 74 km (46 mi) south-east of the regional capital Szczecin.

For the history of the region, see History of Pomerania.
