= Struga Goleniowska =

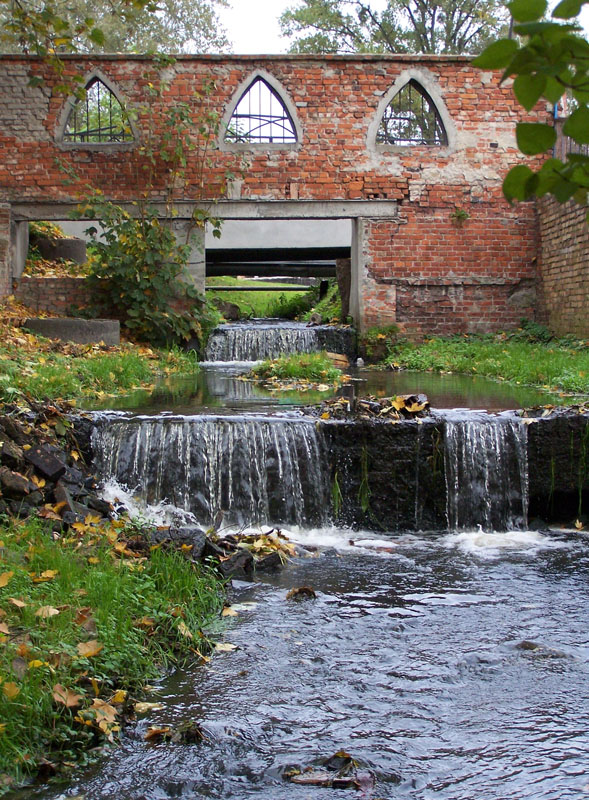

Location
- Country: Poland

Physical characteristics
- Mouth
  - location: Ina
  - coordinates: 53°33′46″N 14°49′38″E

Basin features
- Progression: Ina→ Oder→ Baltic Sea

Struga Goleniowska is a river of Poland, a tributary of the Ina that meets the Ina at the town of Goleniów.
