= Nowy Dwór, Międzyrzecz County =

Nowy Dwór
- Village
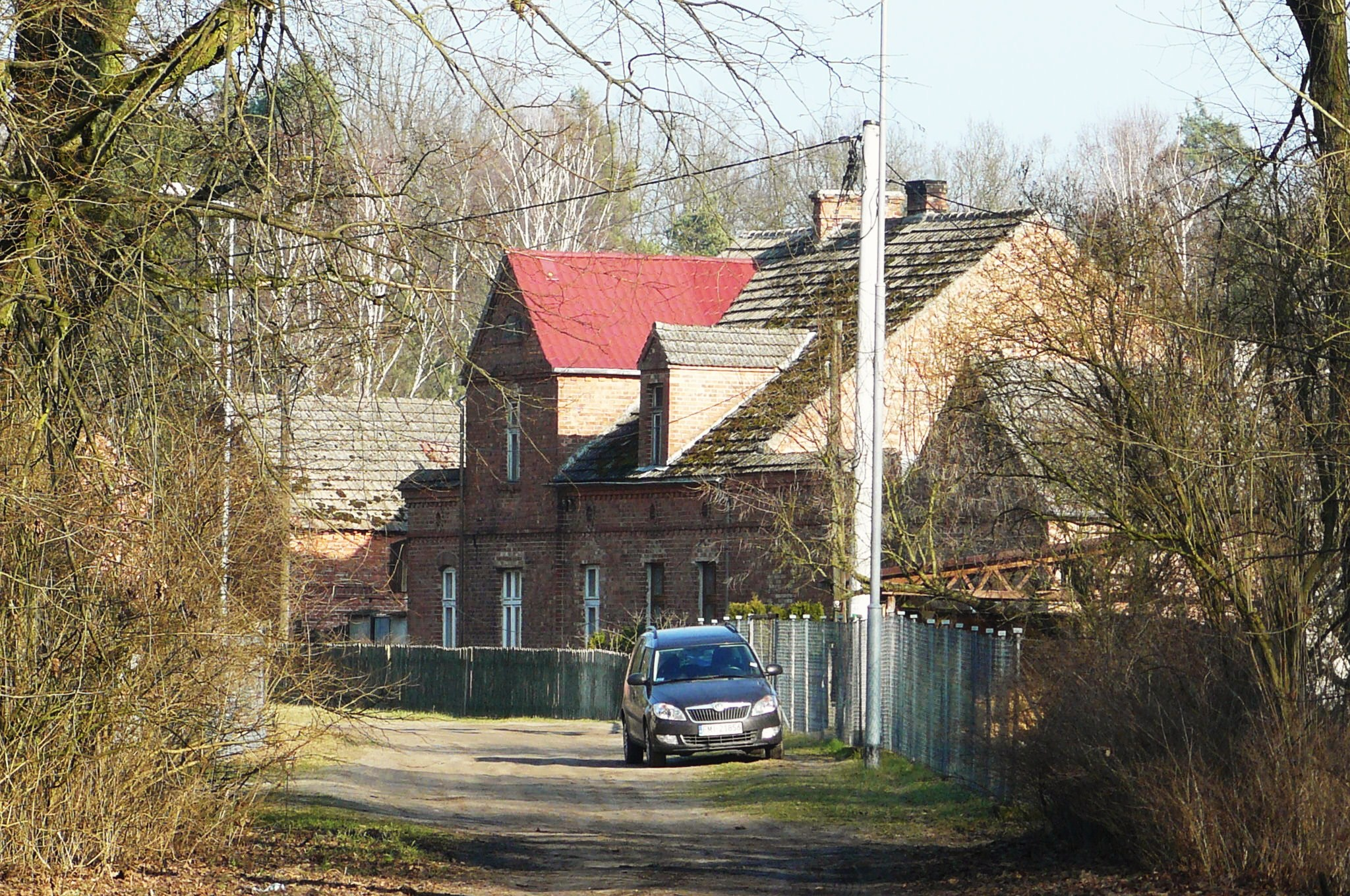

- Location within Poland
- Coordinates: 52°38′N 15°38′E
- Country: Poland
- Voivodeship: Lubusz
- County: Międzyrzecz
- Gmina: Skwierzyna

Nowy Dwór [ˈnɔvɨ ˈdvur] (formerly German Neuhaus) is a village in the administrative district of Gmina Skwierzyna, within Międzyrzecz County, Lubusz Voivodeship, in western Poland.
