= Nowy Klukom =

- Village
- Location within Poland
- Coordinates: 53°6′N 15°29′E
- Country: Poland
- Voivodeship: West Pomeranian
- County: Choszczno
- Gmina: Krzęcin

Nowy Klukom ([ˈnɔvɨ ˈklukɔm]; German: Neu Klücken) is a village in the administrative district of Gmina Krzęcin, within Choszczno County, West Pomeranian Voivodeship, in north-western Poland. It lies approximately 2 km (1 mi) north of Krzęcin, 10 km (6 mi) south-east of Choszczno, and 70 km (43 mi) south-east of the regional capital Szczecin.

For the history of the region, see History of Pomerania.
