= Słonice =

- Village
- Location within Poland
- Coordinates: 53°5′40″N 15°31′0″E
- Country: Poland
- Voivodeship: West Pomeranian
- County: Choszczno
- Gmina: Krzęcin

Słonice ([swɔˈnit͡sɛ]; German: Kleeberg) is a village in the administrative district of Gmina Krzęcin, within Choszczno County, West Pomeranian Voivodeship, in north-western Poland. It lies approximately 3 km (2 mi) north-east of Krzęcin, 12 km (7 mi) south-east of Choszczno, and 72 km (45 mi) south-east of the regional capital Szczecin.

For the history of the region, see History of Pomerania.
