= Gmina Krzęcin =

Gmina Krzęcin Krzęcin Commune
- Gmina
- Flag Coat of arms
- Interactive map of Gmina Krzęcin
- Coordinates (Krzęcin): 53°5′N 15°29′E
- Country: Poland
- Voivodeship: West Pomeranian
- County: Choszczno
- Seat: Krzęcin

Area
  - Total: 140.47 km^{2} (54.24 sq mi)

Population (2006)
  - Total: 3,810
  - Density: 27.1/km^{2} (70.2/sq mi)

Gmina Krzęcin is a rural gmina (administrative district) in Choszczno County, West Pomeranian Voivodeship, in north-western Poland. Its seat is the village of Krzęcin, which lies approximately 11 kilometres (7 mi) south-east of Choszczno and 71 km (44 mi) south-east of the regional capital Szczecin.

The gmina covers an area of 140.47 square kilometres (54.2 sq mi). In 2006 its population was 3,810.

== Villages ==
Gmina Krzęcin contains the villages and settlements of Boguszyce, Bukowno, Chłopowo, Gołąbki, Granówko, Granowo, Grzywacz, Kaszewo, Kolonia Czwarta, Kolonia Piąta, Krzęcin, Ligwiąca, Mielęcin, Nowy Klukom, Objezierze, Pluskocin, Potoczna, Prokolno, Przybysław, Putno, Rakowo, Roszkowice, Sierosławiec, Słonice, Smużyk, Sobieradz, Sobolewo, Sowiniec, Wężnik, Wydrzyn, Wyszyna and Żeńsko.

== Neighbouring gminas ==
Gmina Krzęcin is bordered by the gminas of Bierzwnik, Choszczno, Pełczyce and Strzelce Krajeńskie.
