= Krobielewko =

- Village
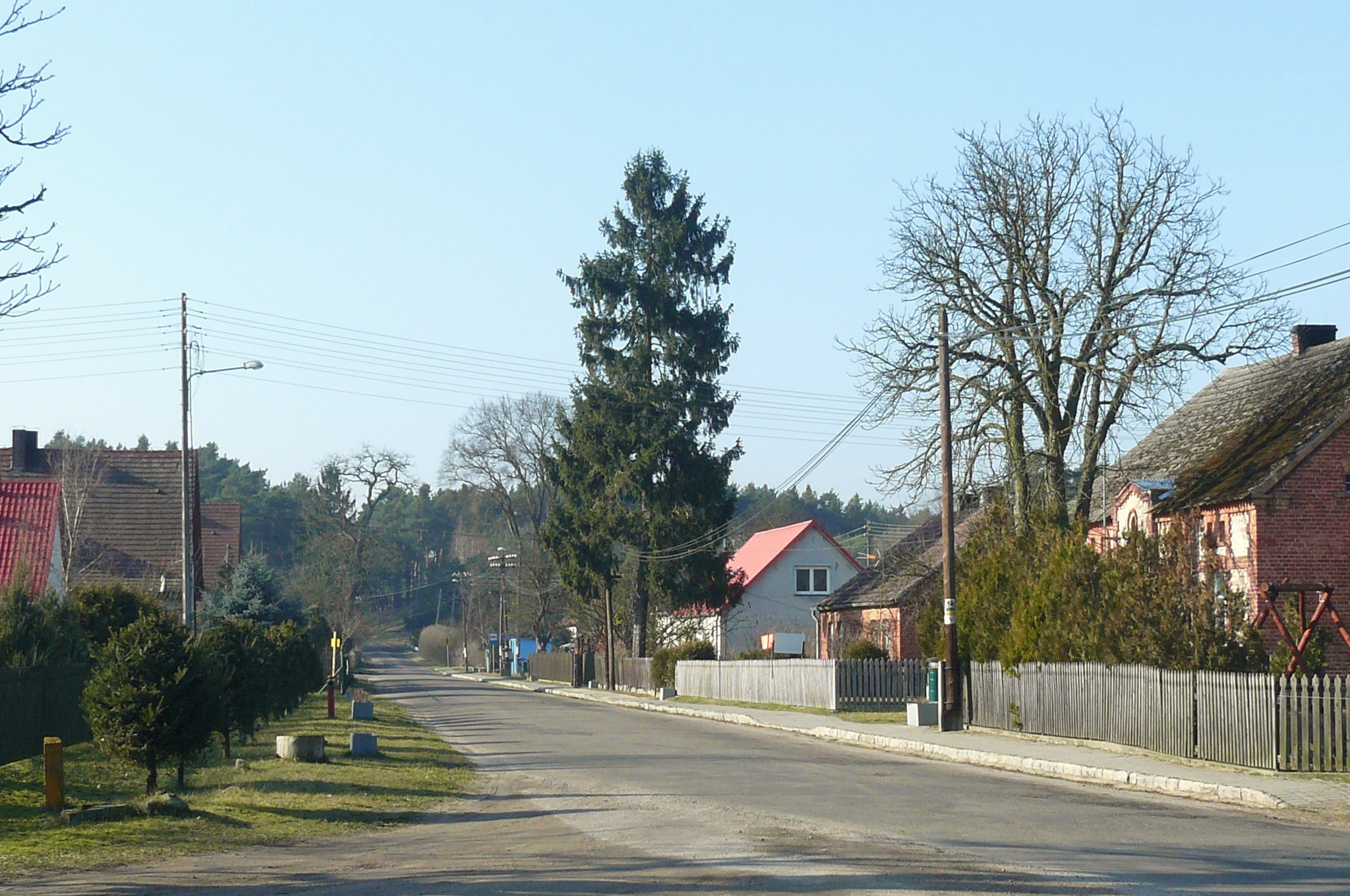

- Location within Poland
- Coordinates: 52°38′N 15°43′E
- Country: Poland
- Voivodeship: Lubusz
- County: Międzyrzecz
- Gmina: Skwierzyna
- Population: 160

Krobielewko [krɔbjɛˈlɛfkɔ] is a village in the administrative district of Gmina Skwierzyna, within Międzyrzecz County, Lubusz Voivodeship, in western Poland.

== Gallery ==
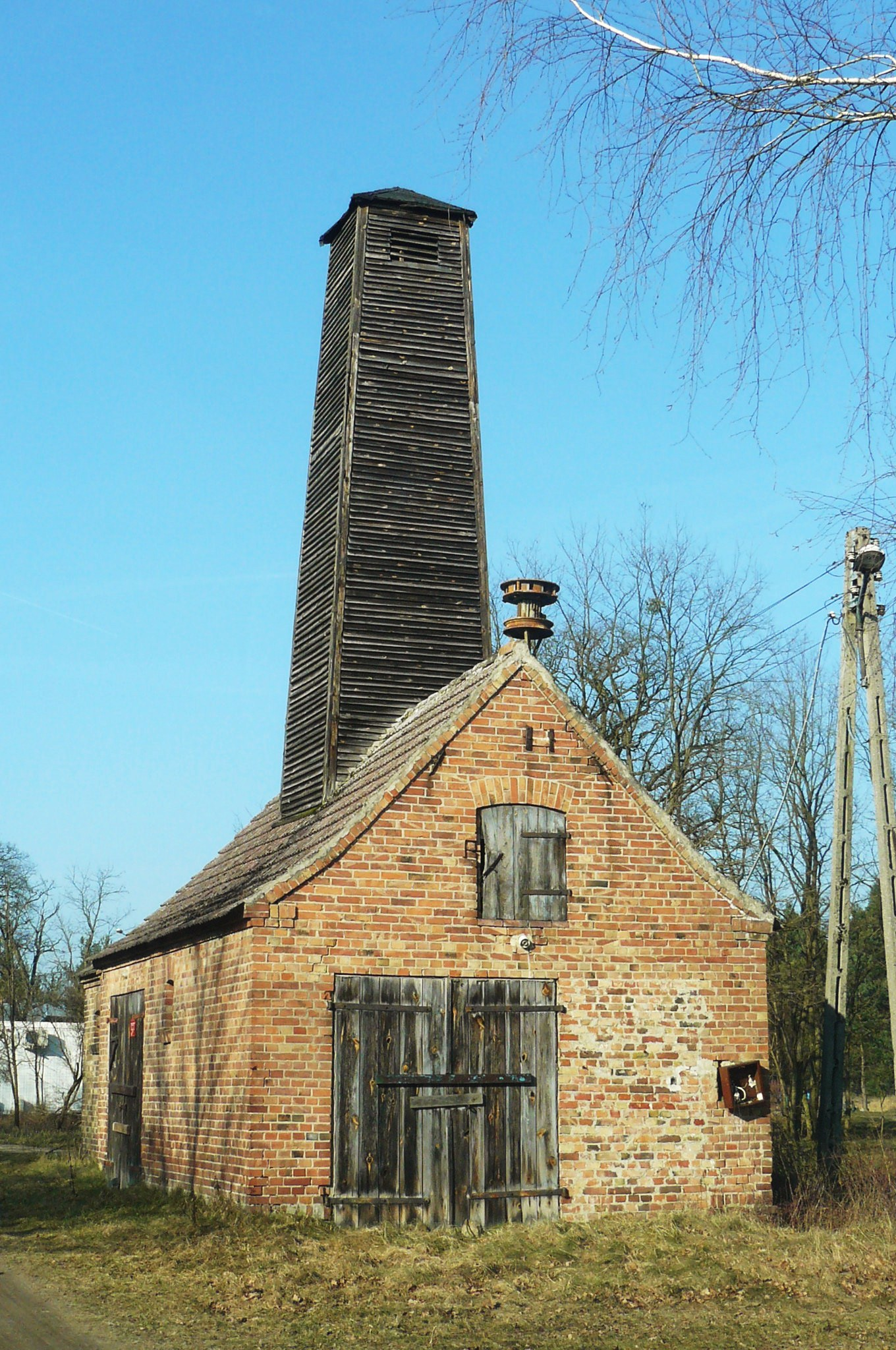
Fire Department

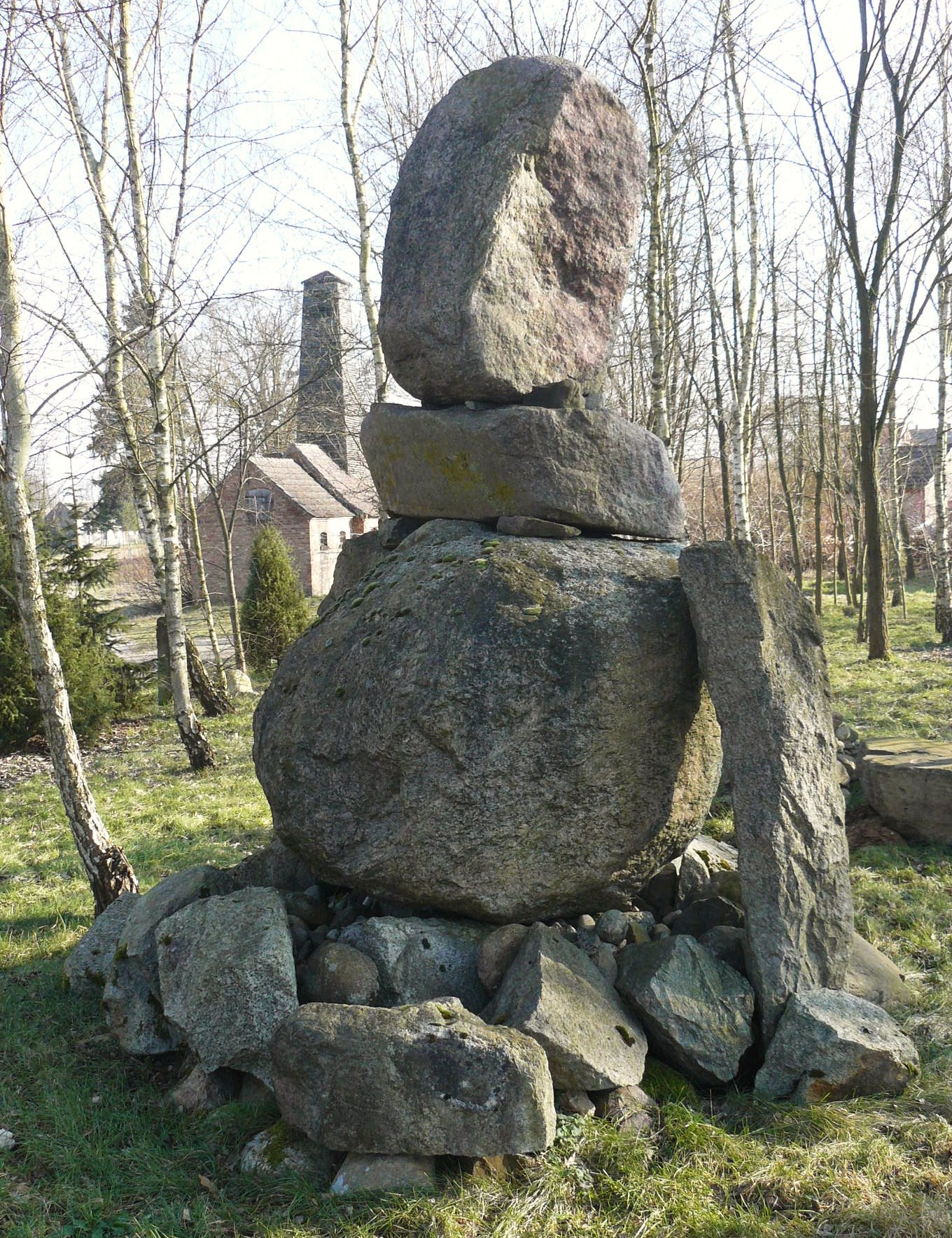
Sculptural composition

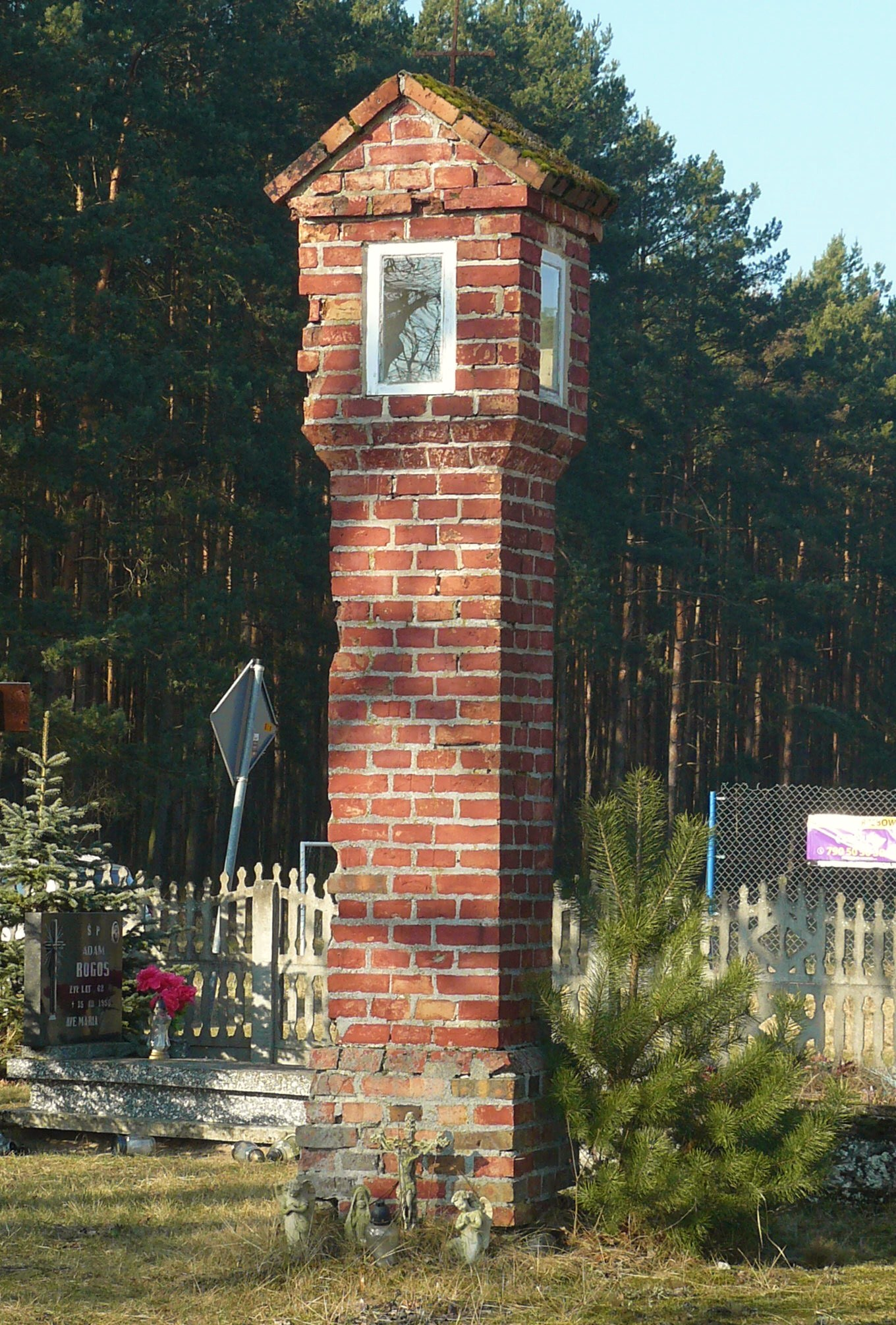
Cemetery, wayside shrine

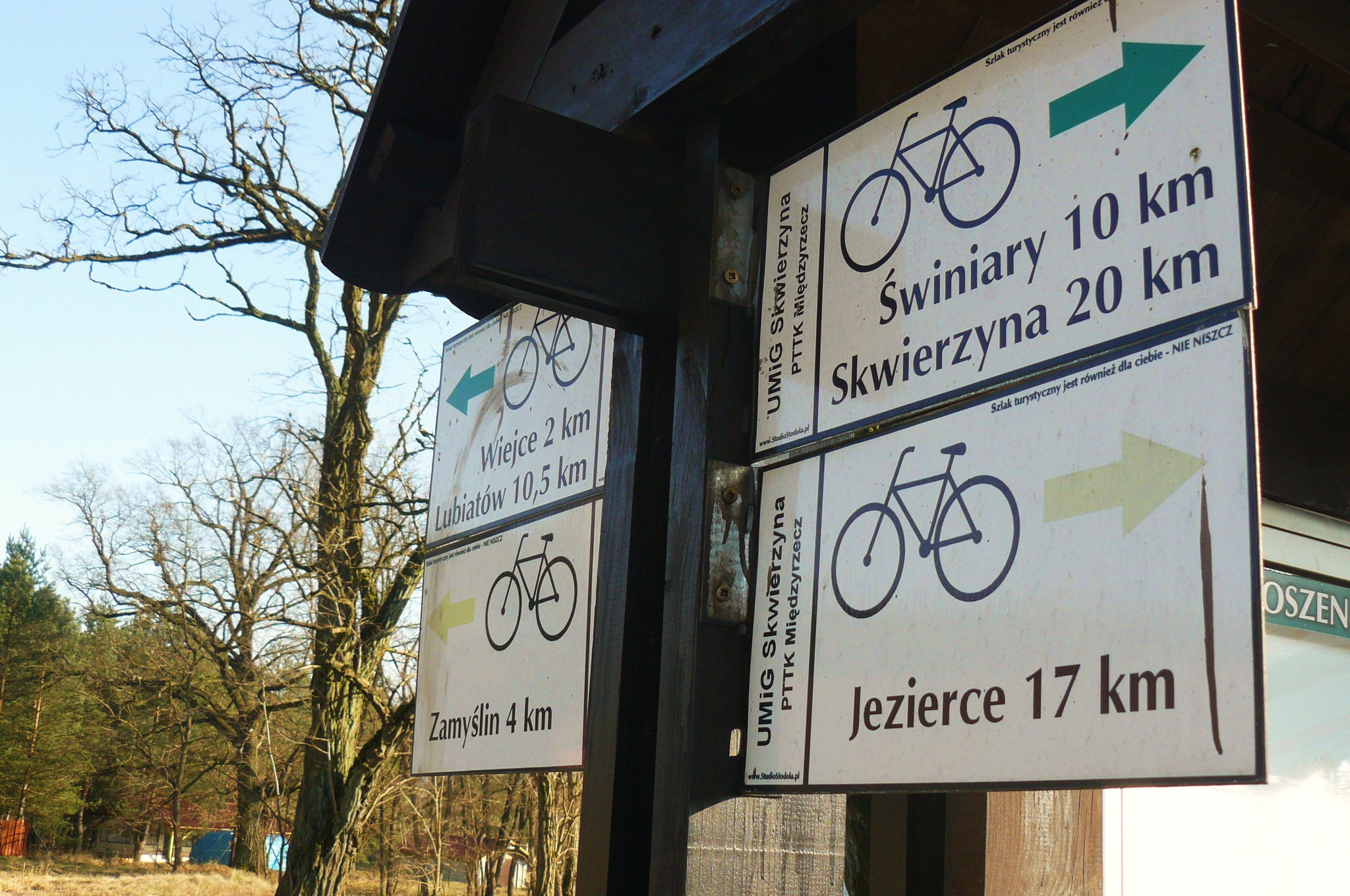
Bike trails
