= Murzynowo-Łomno =

- Village
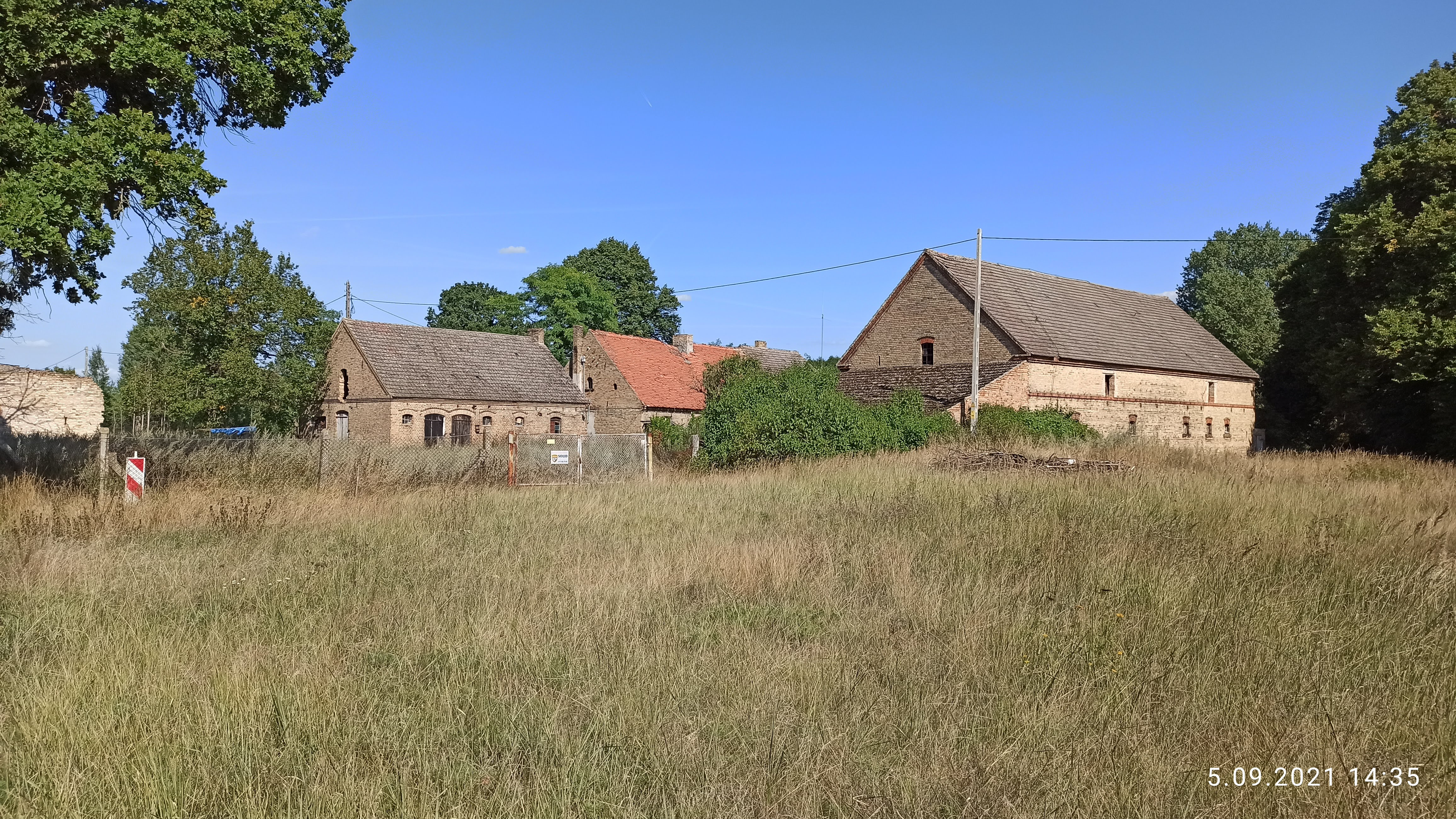

- Location within Poland
- Coordinates: 52°39′35″N 15°27′05″E
- Country: Poland
- Voivodeship: Lubusz
- County: Międzyrzecz
- Gmina: Skwierzyna

Murzynowo-Łomno [muʐɨˈnɔvɔ ˈwɔmnɔ] is a village in the administrative district of Gmina Skwierzyna, within Międzyrzecz County, Lubusz Voivodeship, in western Poland.
