= Rakowo, Choszczno County =

Rakowo
- Village
- Location within Poland
- Coordinates: 53°6′N 15°32′E
- Country: Poland
- Voivodeship: West Pomeranian
- County: Choszczno
- Gmina: Krzęcin

Rakowo ([raˈkɔvɔ]; German: Raakow) is a village in the administrative district of Gmina Krzęcin, within Choszczno County, West Pomeranian Voivodeship, in north-western Poland. It lies approximately 4 km (2 mi) north-east of Krzęcin, 12 km (7 mi) south-east of Choszczno, and 73 km (45 mi) south-east of the regional capital Szczecin.

For several hundred years the village had been an estate in possession of the German noble family von Goltz, until in 1789 it was bought by Berend Ludwig von Delitz, a member of another German noble family.

For the history of the region, see History of Pomerania.

The village has a population of less than 300 people.
