= Warcin =

- Village
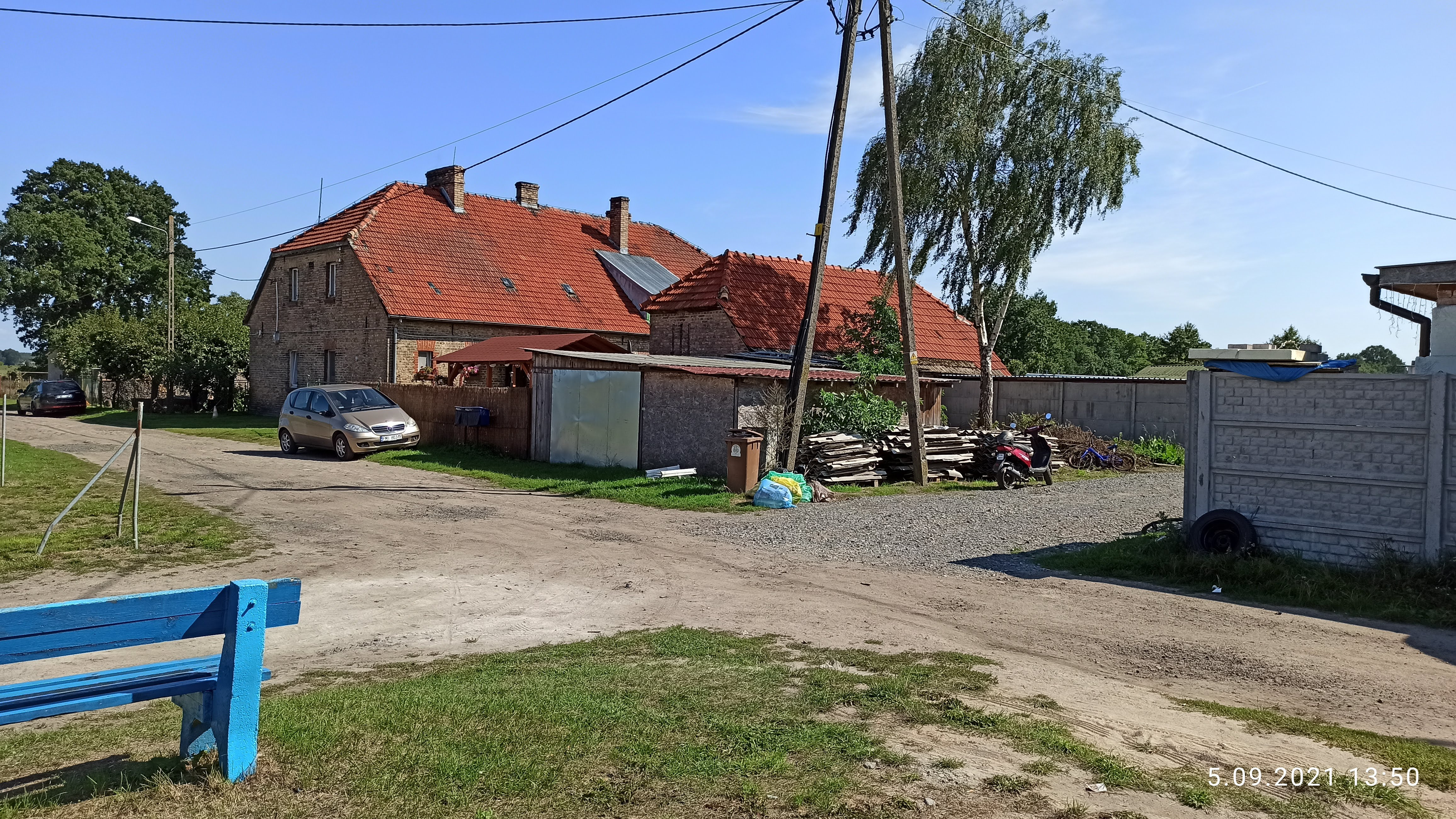

- Location within Poland
- Coordinates: 52°40′3″N 15°24′34″E
- Country: Poland
- Voivodeship: Lubusz
- County: Międzyrzecz
- Gmina: Skwierzyna

Warcin [ˈvart͡ɕin] is a village in the administrative district of Gmina Skwierzyna, within Międzyrzecz County, Lubusz Voivodeship, in western Poland.
