= Roszkowice, West Pomeranian Voivodeship =

Roszkowice
- Village
- Location within Poland
- Coordinates: 53°02′03″N 15°34′47″E
- Country: Poland
- Voivodeship: West Pomeranian
- County: Choszczno
- Gmina: Krzęcin

Roszkowice [rɔʂkɔˈvit͡sɛ] is a village in the administrative district of Gmina Krzęcin, within Choszczno County, West Pomeranian Voivodeship, in north-western Poland.

For the history of the region, see History of Pomerania.
