= Gmina Skwierzyna =

Gmina Skwierzyna Skwierzyna Commune
- Gmina
- Flag Coat of arms
- Interactive map of Gmina Skwierzyna
- Coordinates (Skwierzyna): 52°36′N 15°30′E
- Country: Poland
- Voivodeship: Lubusz
- County: Międzyrzecz
- Seat: Skwierzyna

Area
  - Total: 284.81 km^{2} (109.97 sq mi)

Population (2019-06-30)
  - Total: 12,178
  - Density: 42.758/km^{2} (110.74/sq mi)
  - Urban: 9,671
  - Rural: 2,507
- Website: www.skwierzyna.pl

Gmina Skwierzyna is an urban-rural gmina (administrative district) in Międzyrzecz County, Lubusz Voivodeship, in western Poland. Its seat is the town of Skwierzyna, which lies approximately 19 kilometres (12 mi) north of Międzyrzecz and 26 km (16 mi) south-east of Gorzów Wielkopolski.

The gmina covers an area of 284.81 square kilometres (110.0 sq mi), and as of 2019 its total population is 12,178.

== Villages ==
Apart from the town of Skwierzyna, Gmina Skwierzyna contains the villages and settlements of Dobrojewo, Gościnowo, Jezierce, Kijewice, Krobielewko, Murzynowo, Murzynowo-Łomno, Nowy Dwór, Rakowo, Skrzynica, Świniary, Trzebiszewo, Warcin and Wiejce.

== Neighbouring gminas ==
Gmina Skwierzyna is bordered by the gminas of Bledzew, Deszczno, Drezdenko, Międzychód, Przytoczna and Santok.

== Twin towns – sister cities ==
Gmina Skwierzyna is twinned with:

- Bernau bei Berlin, Germany
- Durbe, Latvia
- Fredersdorf-Vogelsdorf, Germany
- Międzychód, Poland
