= Świniary, Międzyrzecz County =

Świniary
- Village
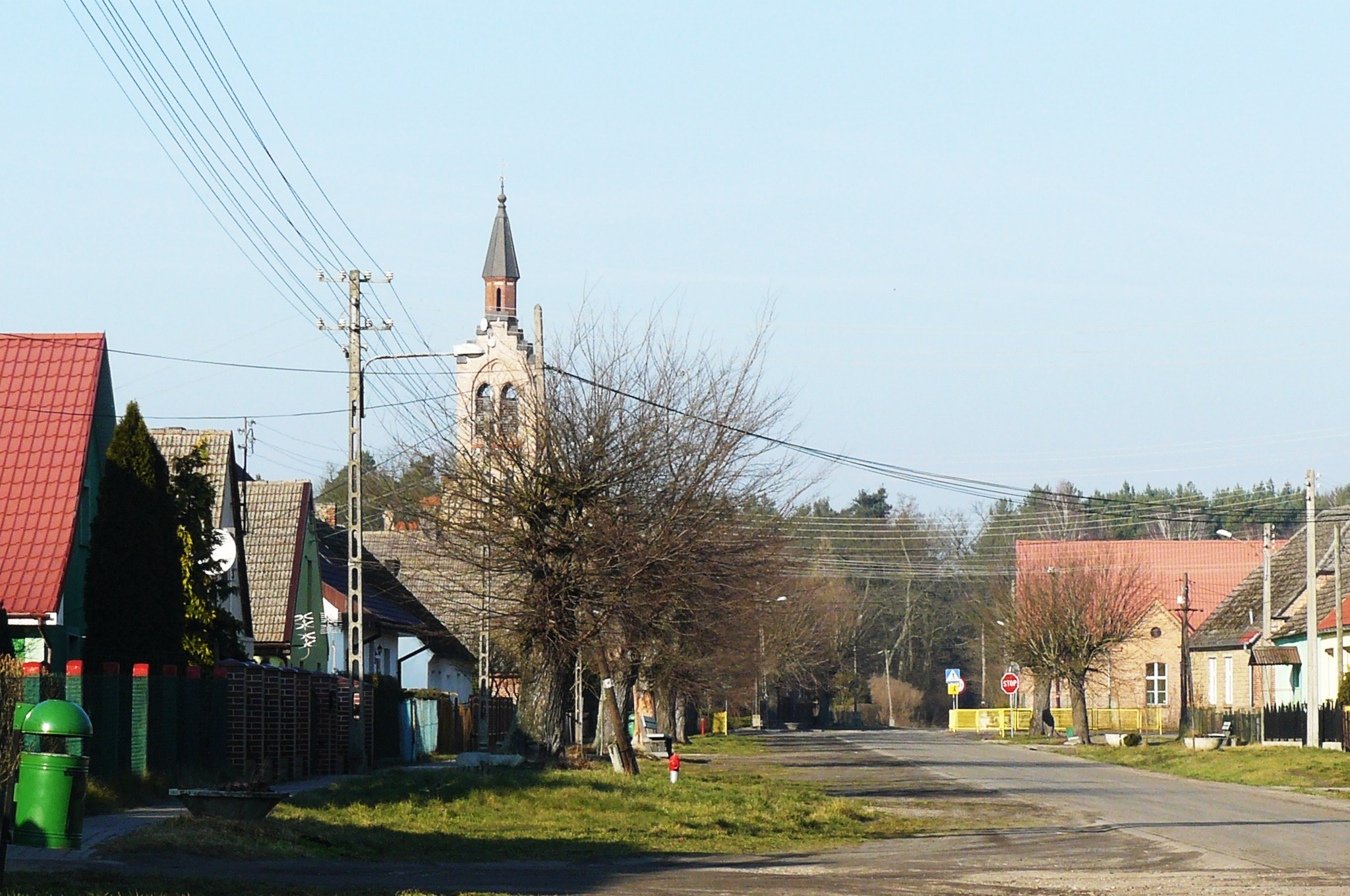

- Location within Poland
- Coordinates: 52°37′N 15°35′E
- Country: Poland
- Voivodeship: Lubusz
- County: Międzyrzecz
- Gmina: Skwierzyna

Świniary [ɕfiˈɲarɨ] is a village in the administrative district of Gmina Skwierzyna, within Międzyrzecz County, Lubusz Voivodeship, in western Poland.
