= Skrzynica =

- Village
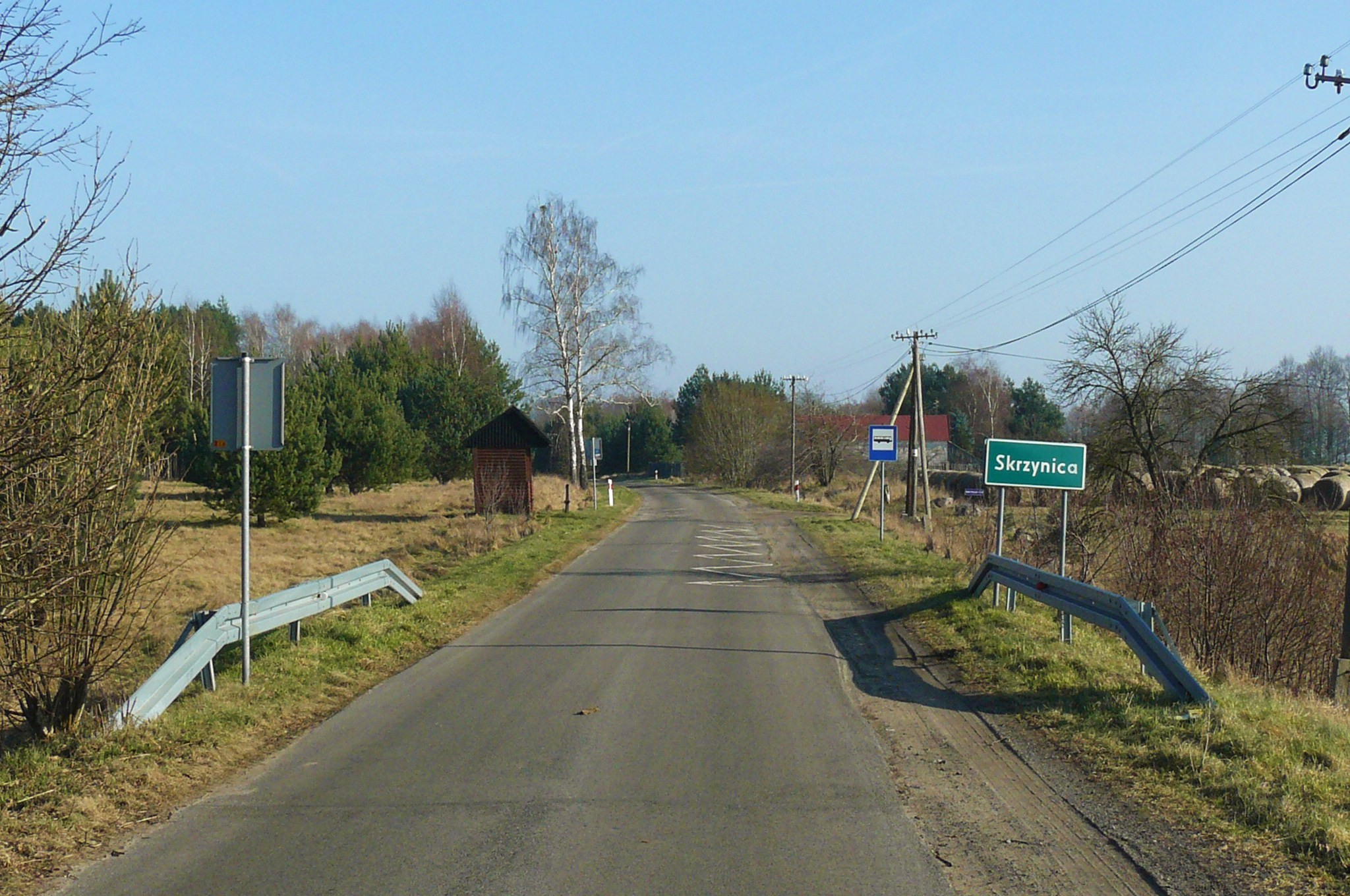

- Location within Poland
- Coordinates: 52°37′N 15°40′E
- Country: Poland
- Voivodeship: Lubusz
- County: Międzyrzecz
- Gmina: Skwierzyna
- Population: 50

Skrzynica [skʂɨˈnit͡sa] is a village in the administrative district of Gmina Skwierzyna, within Międzyrzecz County, Lubusz Voivodeship, in western Poland.
