= Wiejce =

- Village
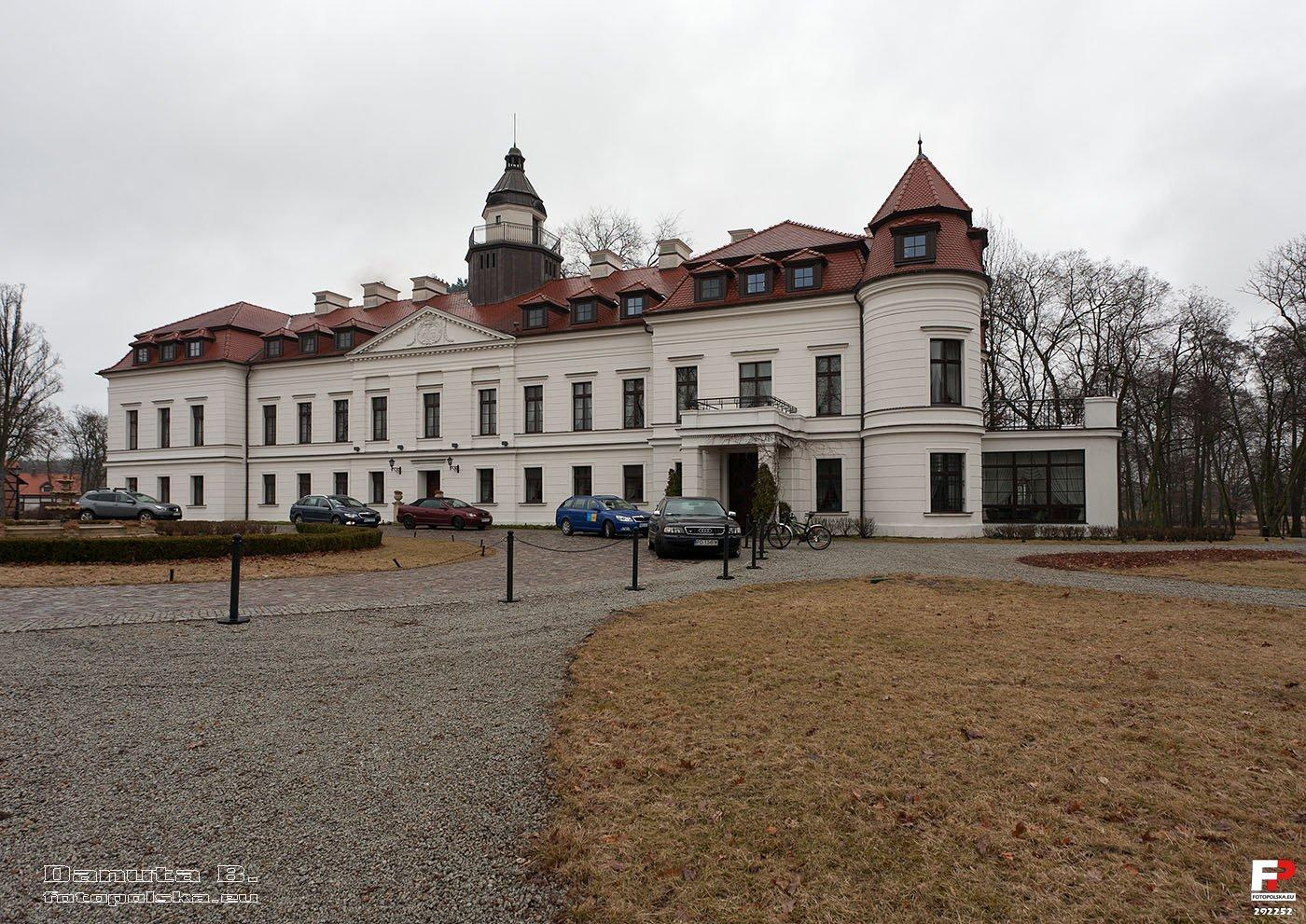

- Location within Poland
- Coordinates: 52°38′N 15°45′E
- Country: Poland
- Voivodeship: Lubusz
- County: Międzyrzecz
- Gmina: Skwierzyna
- Population: 90

Wiejce [ˈvjɛi̯t͡sɛ] is a village in the administrative district of Gmina Skwierzyna, within Międzyrzecz County, Lubusz Voivodeship, in western Poland.

The village neighbours Wiejce Palace, a historic country house and is part of the historic Wiejce Palace Estate.
