= Grzywacz, West Pomeranian Voivodeship =

Grzywacz
- Village
- Location within Poland
- Coordinates: 53°4′38″N 15°31′22″E
- Country: Poland
- Voivodeship: West Pomeranian
- County: Choszczno
- Gmina: Krzęcin

Grzywacz ([ˈɡʐɨvat͡ʂ]; German: Griese) is a village in the administrative district of Gmina Krzęcin, within Choszczno County, West Pomeranian Voivodeship, in north-western Poland. It lies approximately 3 km (2 mi) east of Krzęcin, 13 km (8 mi) south-east of Choszczno, and 74 km (46 mi) south-east of the regional capital Szczecin.

For the history of the region, see History of Pomerania.
