= Gościnowo =

- Village
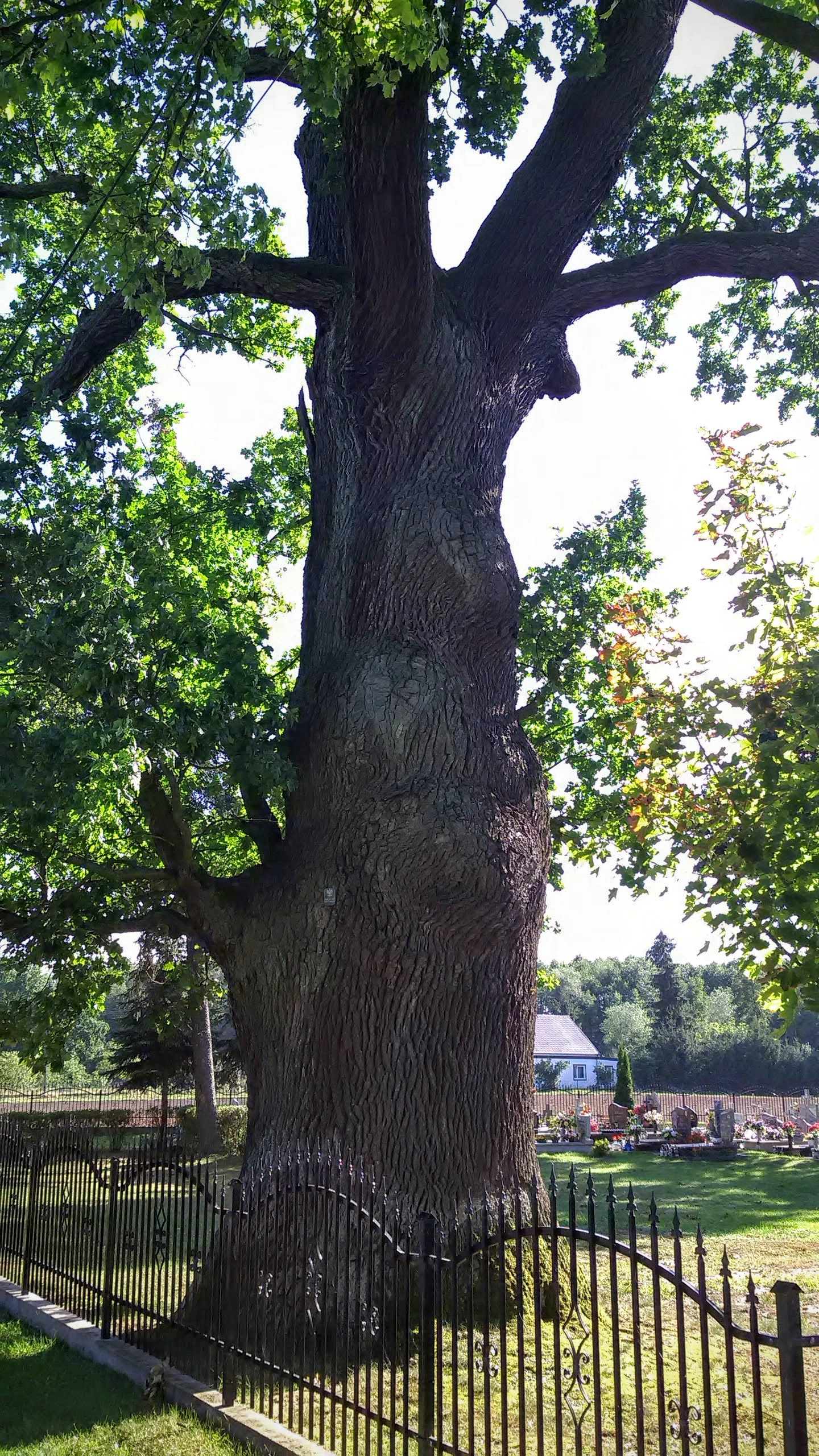
- An old oak, a natural monument of Gościnowo

- Location within Poland
- Coordinates: 52°41′N 15°25′E
- Country: Poland
- Voivodeship: Lubusz
- County: Międzyrzecz
- Gmina: Skwierzyna
- Established: 1613
- Founder: Aleksander Zborowski
- Time zone: UTC+1 (CET)
  - Summer (DST): UTC+2 (CEST)
- Vehicle registration: FMI

Gościnowo (Polish: [ɡɔɕt͡ɕiˈnɔvɔ]) is a village in the administrative district of Gmina Skwierzyna, within Międzyrzecz County, Lubusz Voivodeship, in western Poland.

== History ==
Gościnowo was founded in 1613 by Polish nobleman and starosta of nearby Międzyrzecz Aleksander Zborowski. It was initially named Aleksandrowo after its founder. Administratively it was located in the Poznań County in the Poznań Voivodeship in the Greater Poland Province of the Polish Crown. It was annexed by Prussia in the Second Partition of Poland in 1793. In 1807 it was regained by Poles and included in the short-lived Duchy of Warsaw, and after its dissolution it was reannexed by Prussia in 1815.

From 1871 to 1945 it was part of Germany. After the defeat of Germany in World War II the region was restored to Poland by the Potsdam Agreement under territorial changes demanded by the Soviet Union.
