= Mała Ina =

Location
- Country: Poland
- Voivodeship: West Pomeranian

Physical characteristics
- Source: Lake Mielęcino
  - location: south of Słonice, Choszczno County
  - coordinates: 53°04′03.4″N 15°30′55.2″E
- Mouth: Ina
  - location: southeast Stargard, Stargard County
  - coordinates: 53.3169°N 15.0570°E
  - elevation: 19 m (62 ft)
- Length: 55.06 km (34.21 mi)
- Basin size: 426 km^{2} (164 mi^{2})

Basin features
- Progression: Ina→ Oder→ Baltic Sea

Mała Ina is a river of Poland, a tributary of the Ina near Stargard.
