= Murzynowo, Lubusz Voivodeship =

Murzynowo
- Village
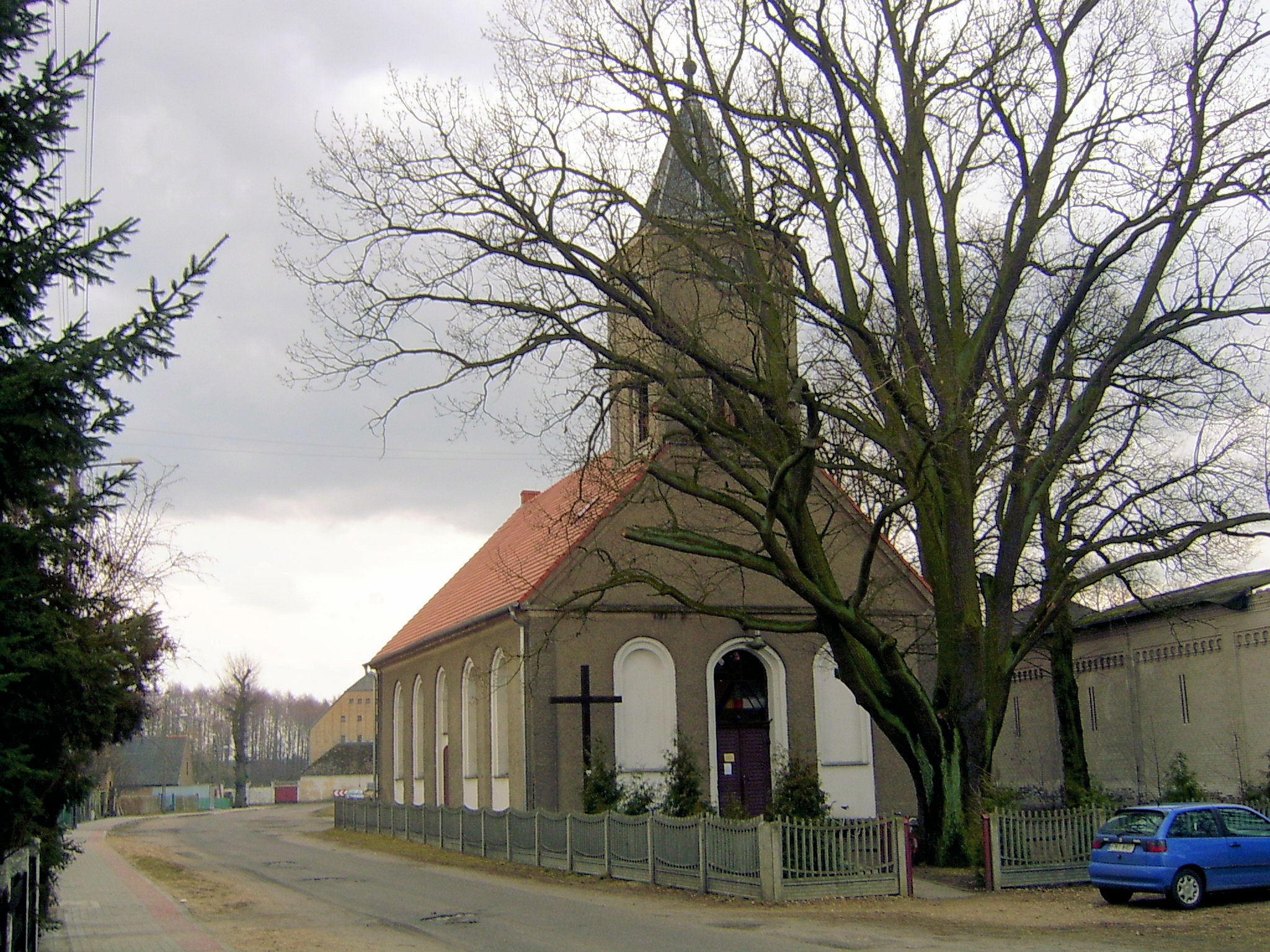
- Former Protestant, currently Catholic church

- Location within Poland
- Coordinates: 52°38′N 15°27′E
- Country: Poland
- Voivodeship: Lubusz
- County: Międzyrzecz
- Gmina: Skwierzyna
- Elevation: 26 m (85 ft)

Population
  - Total: 1,000

Murzynowo [muʐɨˈnɔvɔ] is a village in the administrative district of Gmina Skwierzyna, within Międzyrzecz County, Lubusz Voivodeship, in western Poland.
