= Żeńsko, Choszczno County =

Żeńsko
- Village
- Location within Poland
- Coordinates: 53°6′28″N 15°26′54″E
- Country: Poland
- Voivodeship: West Pomeranian
- County: Choszczno
- Gmina: Krzęcin
- Population: 300

Żeńsko ([ˈʐɛɲskɔ]; German: Schönfeld) is a village in the administrative district of Gmina Krzęcin, within Choszczno County, West Pomeranian Voivodeship, in north-western Poland. It lies approximately 4 km (2 mi) north-west of Krzęcin, 8 km (5 mi) south-east of Choszczno, and 68 km (42 mi) south-east of the regional capital Szczecin.

For the history of the region, see History of Pomerania.

The village has a population of 300.
