= Pęzino =

- Village
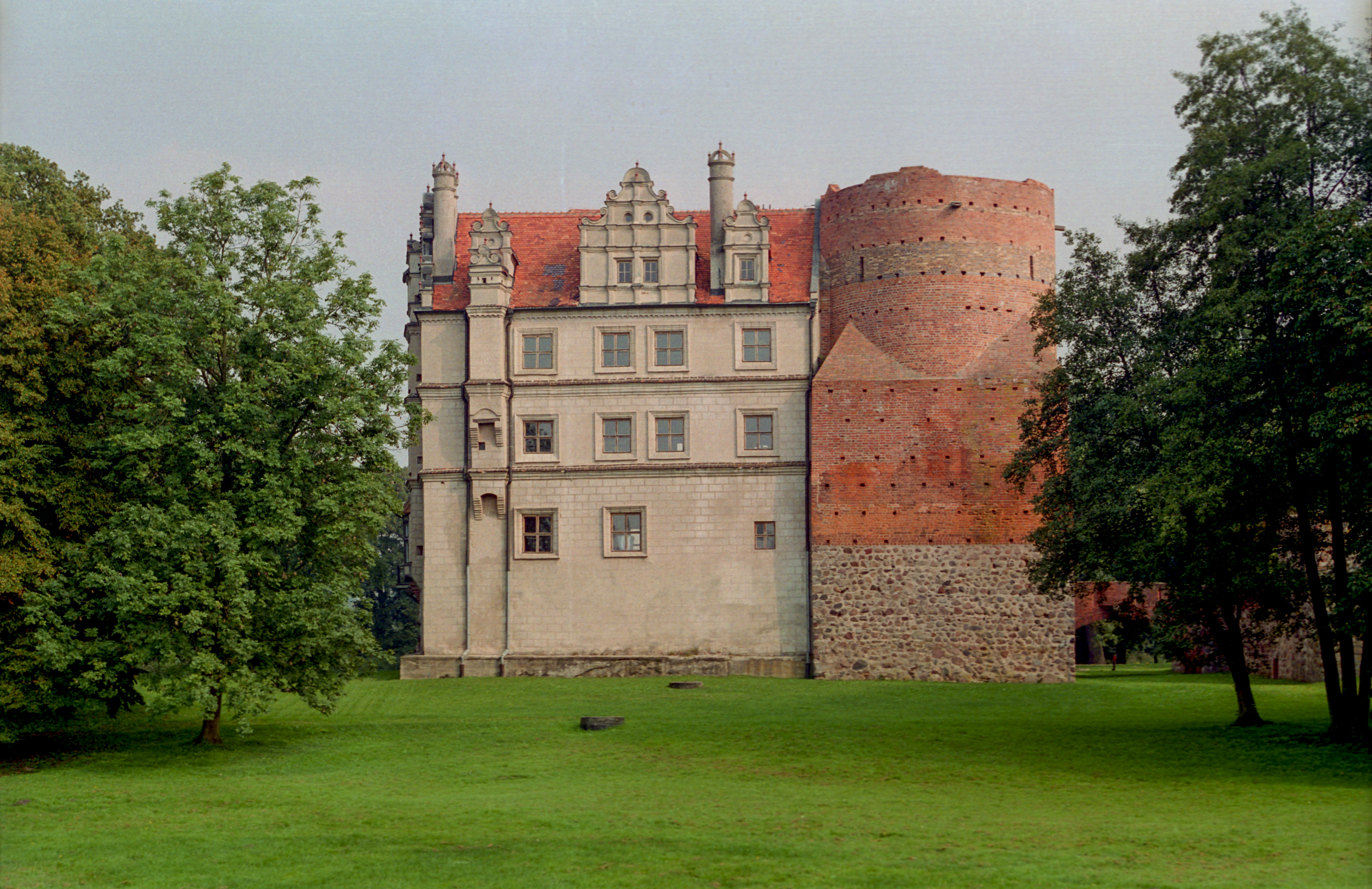
- Pęzino Castle

- Location within Poland
- Coordinates: 53°20′N 15°12′E
- Country: Poland
- Voivodeship: West Pomeranian
- County: Stargard
- Gmina: Stargard
- Population: 1,162

Pęzino [pɛ̃ˈʑinɔ] (German Pansin) is a village in the administrative district of Gmina Stargard, within Stargard County, West Pomeranian Voivodeship, in north-western Poland. It lies approximately 10 km (6 mi) east of Stargard.

For the history of the region, see History of Pomerania. The village has a population of 1,162.
