= Jezierce, Lubusz Voivodeship =

Jezierce
- Settlement
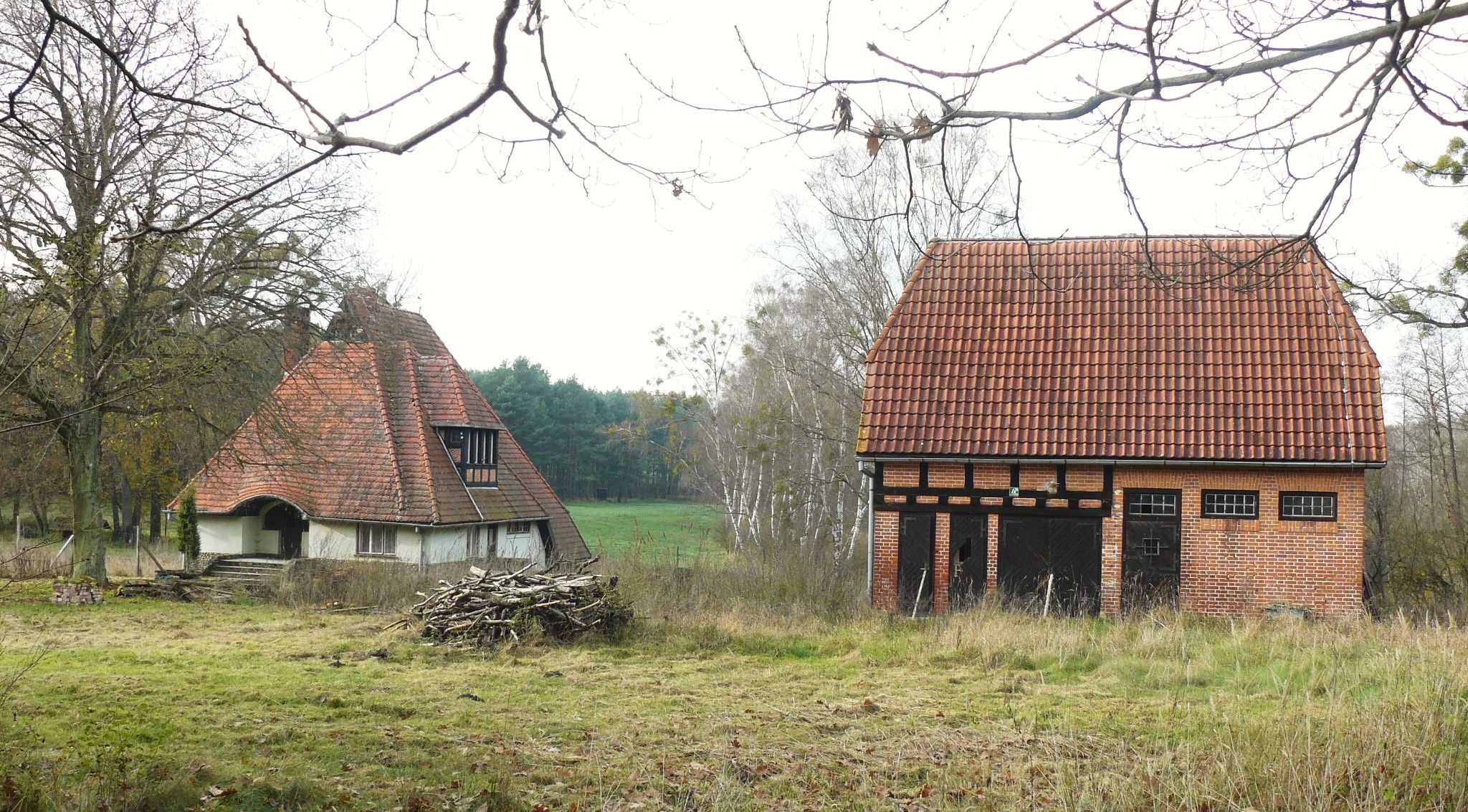

- Location within Poland
- Coordinates: 52°41′N 15°33′E
- Country: Poland
- Voivodeship: Lubusz
- County: Międzyrzecz
- Gmina: Skwierzyna

Jezierce [jɛˈʑɛrt͡sɛ] is a settlement in the administrative district of Gmina Skwierzyna, within Międzyrzecz County, Lubusz Voivodeship, in western Poland.
