= Ina (river) =

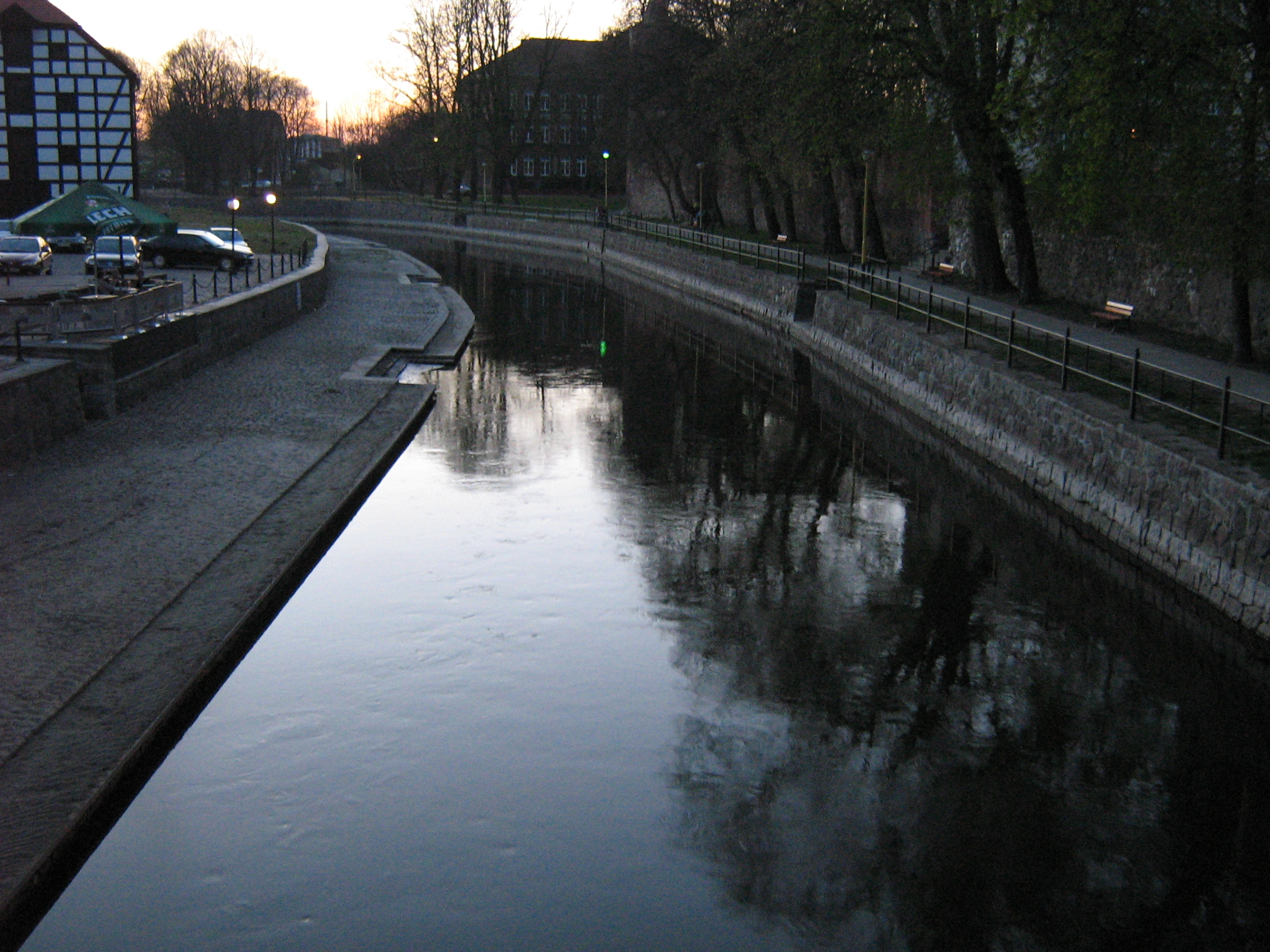

Location
- Country: Poland

Physical characteristics
- Mouth
  - location: Oder
  - coordinates: 53.5342°N 14.6356°E

Basin features
- Progression: Oder→ Baltic Sea

The Ina (German: Ihna) is a river in northwestern Poland, a right tributary of the Oder River.

The origins of the river are in Insko Lake (Polish: jezioro Ińsko), and it flows through a succession of smaller lakes. The confluence of the Ina River is localized in Police town, near Szczecin. It has a length of 129 km, and the basin area of the Ina is 2189 km^{2}.

The main towns situated on the Ina River are:

- Ińsko
- Goleniów
- Stargard with the famous Stargard Mill Gate
- Police, Poland (on the confluence of Ina River into the Oder)

In Pomeranian history, the Ihna from 1295 to 1464 separated Pomerania-Stettin and Pomerania-Wolgast. In the 16th century, it was one of the first European rivers to have its channel straightened, and was an important shipping artery up to WWII. Tributaries of the Ina are: Krępiel, Mała Ina, Reczek, Struga Goleniowska.

== See also ==
- Mała Ina
