= Trzebiszewo =

- Village
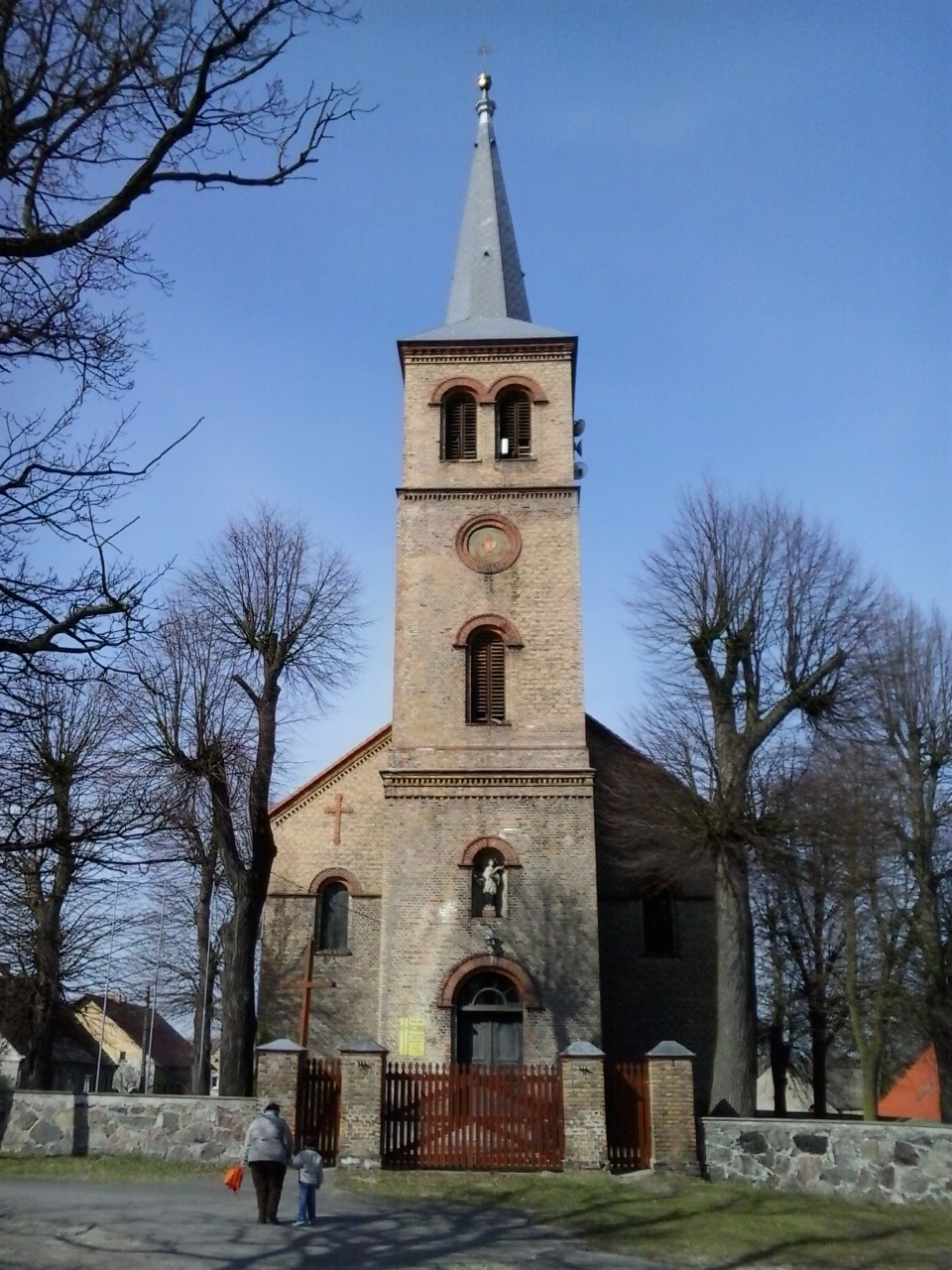
- Saint John of Nepomuk church in Trzebiszewo

- Location within Poland
- Coordinates: 52°38′N 15°23′E
- Country: Poland
- Voivodeship: Lubusz
- County: Międzyrzecz
- Gmina: Skwierzyna

Population
  - Total: 640
- Time zone: UTC+1 (CET)
  - Summer (DST): UTC+2 (CEST)
- Vehicle registration: FMI

Trzebiszewo [tʂɛbiˈʂɛvɔ] is a village in the administrative district of Gmina Skwierzyna, within Międzyrzecz County, Lubusz Voivodeship, in western Poland.

Trzebiszewo was a private church village, administratively located in the Poznań County in the Poznań Voivodeship in the Greater Poland Province of the Kingdom of Poland.
