= Gołąbki, Choszczno County =

Gołąbki
- Village
- Location within Poland
- Coordinates: 53°05′20″N 15°24′37″E
- Country: Poland
- Voivodeship: West Pomeranian
- County: Choszczno
- Gmina: Krzęcin

Gołąbki [ɡɔˈwɔmpki] is a village in the administrative district of Gmina Krzęcin, within Choszczno County, West Pomeranian Voivodeship, in north-western Poland.

For the history of the region, see History of Pomerania.
