= Rakowo, Lubusz Voivodeship =

Rakowo
- Village
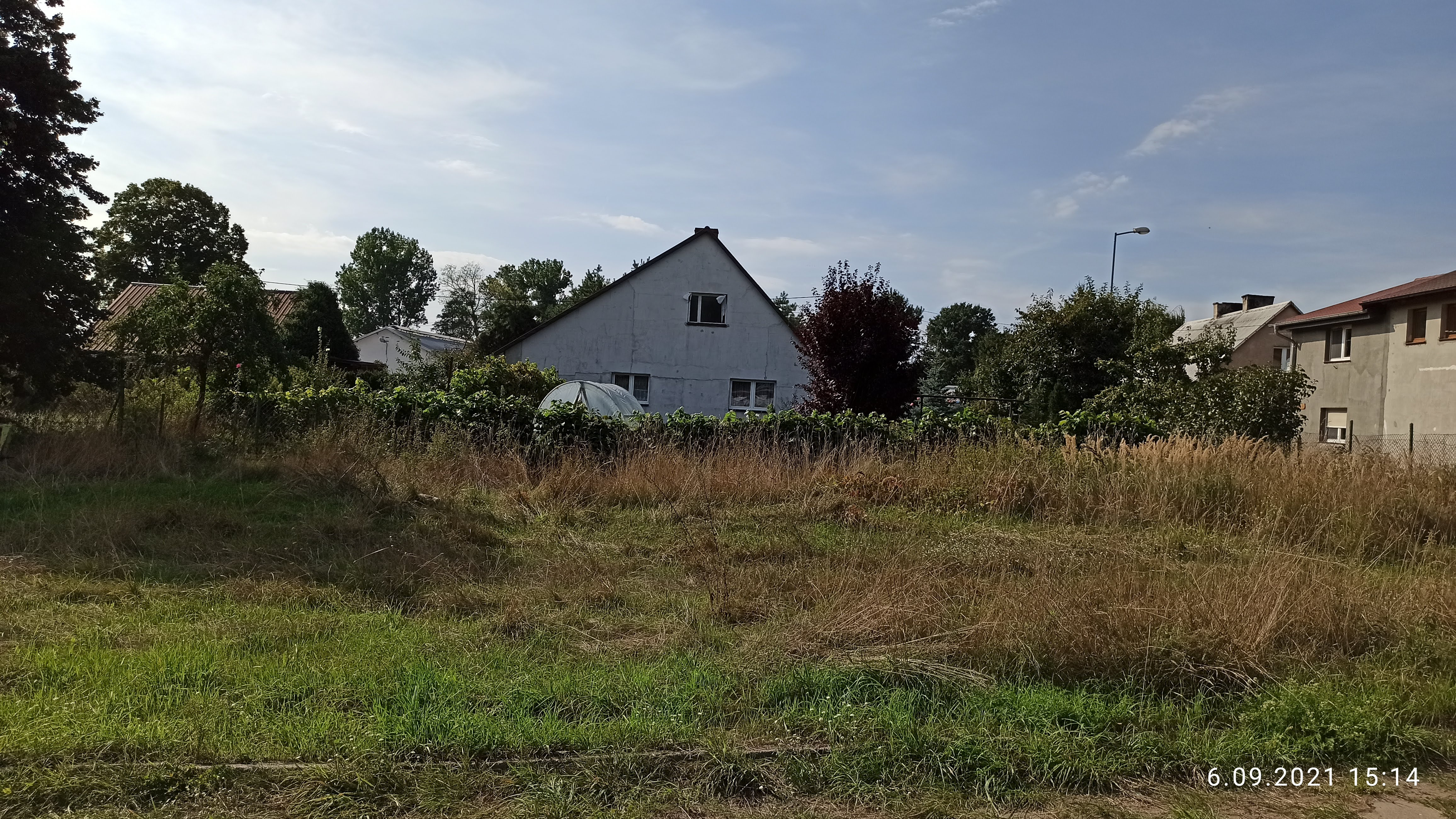

- Location within Poland
- Coordinates: 52°36′37″N 15°26′36″E
- Country: Poland
- Voivodeship: Lubusz
- County: Międzyrzecz
- Gmina: Skwierzyna

Rakowo [raˈkɔvɔ] is a village in the administrative district of Gmina Skwierzyna, within Międzyrzecz County, Lubusz Voivodeship, in western Poland.
