= Krępiel =

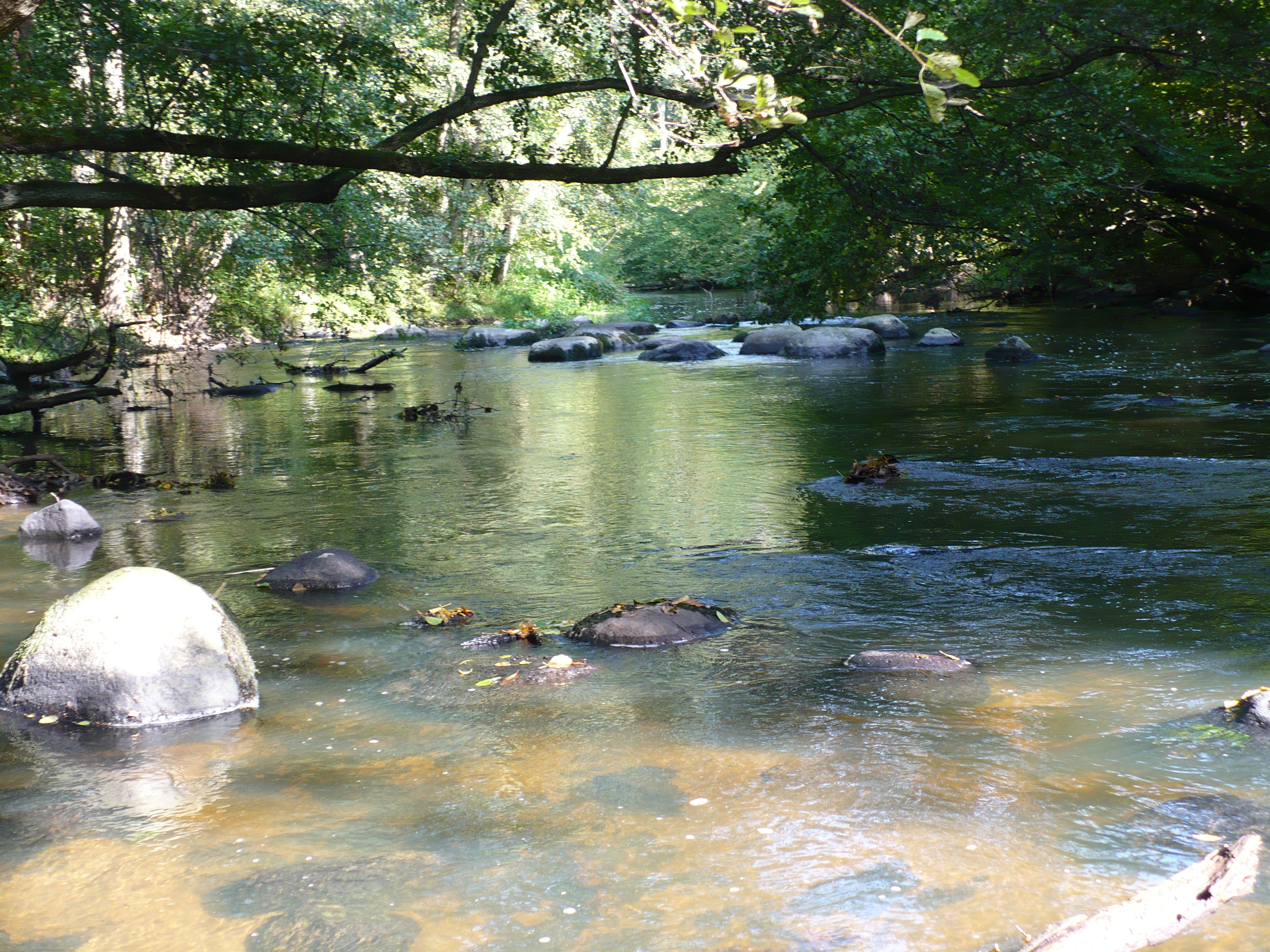

Location
- Country: Poland
- Voivodeship: West Pomeranian
- County (Powiat): Stargard

Physical characteristics
- Source: Kamienny Most
  - location: Gmina Chociwel
  - coordinates: 53°26′52″N 15°28′22″E
  - elevation: 78.5 m (258 ft)
- Mouth: Ina
  - location: south of Stargard, Gmina Stargard
  - coordinates: 53°19′08″N 15°03′07″E
- Length: 70 km (43 mi)

Basin features
- Progression: Ina→ Oder→ Baltic Sea

Krępiel (also: Krąpiel) is a river of Poland. It is a tributary of the Ina, which it joins at Stargard Szczeciński.
