= Krzęcin, West Pomeranian Voivodeship =

Krzęcin
- Village
- Location within Poland
- Coordinates: 53°5′N 15°29′E
- Country: Poland
- Voivodeship: West Pomeranian
- County: Choszczno
- Gmina: Krzęcin
- Population: 1,200
- Website: http://www.krzecin.pl

Krzęcin [ˈkʂɛnt͡ɕin] (German: Kranzin) is a village in Choszczno County, West Pomeranian Voivodeship, in north-western Poland. It is the seat of the gmina (administrative district) called Gmina Krzęcin. It lies approximately 11 km (7 mi) south-east of Choszczno and 71 km (44 mi) south-east of the regional capital Szczecin.

The village has a population of 1,200.

== See also ==
- History of Pomerania
