= Smoleń =

Smoleń or Smolen may refer to:

== Places ==
- Smoleń, Silesian Voivodeship (south Poland)
- Smoleń, Warmian-Masurian Voivodeship (north Poland)
- Smoleń, West Pomeranian Voivodeship (north-west Poland)

== People ==
- Bohdan Smoleń (1947–2016), Polish comedian, singer, actor
- Marta Smoleń (born 1986), Polish civil servant, First Lady of Poland (since 2025)
- Michal Smolen (Smoleń, bron 1993), Polish-American slalom canoeist
- Mike Smolen (1940–1992), American bridge player
- Molly Smolen, American ballet dancer
- Stanisław Smoleń (born 1952), Polish diplomat
- Tomasz Smoleń (born 1983), Polish racing cyclist
- Vivian Smolen (1916–2006), American actress

== Other uses ==
- Smolen (surname)
- Smolen Bridge, a covered bridge in Ohio
- Smolen convention, a bidding convention in contract bridge adjunct to Stayman convention
