= Gładysz, Gmina Choszczno =

Gładysz
- Settlement
- Location within Poland
- Coordinates: 53°14′55″N 15°19′59″E
- Country: Poland
- Voivodeship: West Pomeranian
- County: Choszczno
- Gmina: Choszczno
- Sołectwo: Radaczewo
- Time zone: UTC+1 (CET)
  - Summer (DST): UTC+2 (CEST)
- Postal code: 73-200
- Area code: +48 95

Gładysz (Polish: [ˈɡwa.dɘ̟ʂ]) is a settlement in the West Pomeranian Voivodeship, Poland, located within the Gmina Choszczno, Choszczno County. It is part of the sołectwo of Radaczewo.
