= Sulino =

Sulino may refer to the following places:

- Sulino, Choszczno County in West Pomeranian Voivodeship (north-west Poland)
- Sulino, Pyrzyce County in West Pomeranian Voivodeship (north-west Poland)
- Sulino, Stargard County in West Pomeranian Voivodeship (north-west Poland)
