= Hermann Daniel Hermes =

Prussian protestant theologian

Hermann Daniel Hermes (24 January 1734 – 12 November 1807) was a Prussian protestant theologian. Towards the end of his life he became caught up in the campaign for a return to religious orthodoxy pursued by the Rosicrucian politician Johann Christoph von Wöllner, being employed as an "inquisitor" in 1794 in Halle, and elsewhere.

== Life ==
Hermann Daniel Hermes was born in Petznick, a village near Stargard in Western Pomerania. His father was a Protestant pastor. His mother, Lukrezia, was the daughter of another Protestant pastor, Heinrich Becker from Rostock. His siblings included the successful popular novelist Johann Timotheus Hermes.

After attending school in Wernigerode, in 1750 he commenced a study period at Halle University after which he took a teaching post at the Realschule (school) recently set up in Berlin by Julius Hecker. In 1756 he moved on to a position as a (Protestant) minister at Dierberg near Ruppin, north of Berlin. A succession of church promotions followed. At this stage, there was no sign of the obsessive hostility to new thinking which would become a defining feature of his work after he came under the influence of Wöllner. Eventually, he became senior minister at St. Mary Magdalene in Breslau. He was later identified as a "Prussian inquisitor" and was removed from office without formal explanation.

Much of his later career awaits further modern research, although his prominent role in the anti-enlightenment fundamentalist government mandated "crusading" of the 1790s has recently formed the basis for an historically based novel (in Polish) by the Breslau/Wrocław writer Henryk Waniek.
