= Urszula Broll =

Polish painter (1930–2020)

- Born: March 17, 1930; Katowice, Poland
- Died: February 17, 2020 (aged 89); Przesieka, Poland
- Resting place: Bencien Karma Kamtsang in Grabnik
- Education: ASP Katowice
- Known for: Painting
- Spouse(s): Andrzej Urbanowicz, Henryk Smagacz

Urszula Eugenia Broll-Urbanowicz (17 March 1930 in Katowice – 17 February 2020 in Przesieka) was a Polish painter, animator of underground culture, Buddhist, co-founder of the St-53 Group (1953–56), member of esoteric circle Oneiron (1965-1976), co-initiator and participant of the first Buddhist group in Poland.

== Biography ==
=== Life and career ===
Urszula Broll was born in Katowice, in a family of Silesian origin, where Polish and German influences mixed. Father, Jan Broll, came from a Polish-speaking family from Zabrze. He was a participant in the Silesian Uprisings, head of the Wełowiec commune (now Katowice). Her mother Katarzyna Loch, born in Berlin, came from a German-speaking Silesian family. Urszula was the youngest of the three daughters (the older was Krystyna and the oldest Halina). She started her education in 1937. She studied at the Polish school in Katowice and the German school in Wrocław (for a year). In 1949, she passed her secondary school-leaving examination in a female secondary school in Katowice and entered the Katowice art school, then a Graphic Department of the Academy of Fine Arts in Wrocław (from 1952, the Graphic Arts Department of the Academy of Fine Arts in Kraków) - major in propaganda graphics, poster. She graduated with honors in 1955.

At the end of the 1950s, she married the painter Andrzej Urbanowicz. In 1960, they moved to 1 Piastowska Street, where Broll received an art workshop. Together, they created an underground place for art, an important center of Silesian artistic life.

In 1965, their son Roger was born.

She co-founded the Oneiron Group in 1967 with Andrzej Urbanowicz, Henryk Waniek, Antoni Halor and Zygmunt Stuchlik.

In the 1970s, Urszula and Andrzej Urbanowicz focused their interests on Buddhism. Together with friends (Henryk Waniek, Tadeusz Sławek, Jerzy Illg, Stanisław Kasprzyk), from February 1974, they published the first Buddhist periodical in the Polish People's Republic, entitled Droga (The Way), later called Droga Zen (The Way of Zen). In 1975, the first Buddhist group in Poland was formally established there. Urszula Broll's marriage ended in divorce in 1978. Henryk Smagacz, a companion of spiritual practices, painter and translator, appeared in Urszula's life, who later became her life partner, and in 2016 her husband.

In 1983 Urszula Broll with her son Roger and Henryk Smagacz left Katowice. She lived in Przesieka, in Jelenia Góra Voivodeship (now Lower Silesian Voivodeship), where she spent the rest of her life dealing with painting and spiritual practice. In 2014, she was awarded the honorary decoration Meritorious for Polish Culture.

=== Work ===
Urszula Broll's work began in the 1950s Silesian themes (most famous work is The Old Silesian Woman), changes under the influence of Władysław Strzemiński texts. His views on analyzing the form, changes in the artist's visual awareness, the process of shaping modern art and visual language, and the meaning of the "expanded view of cubism", formed the basis for the creative exploration of St-53 Group, one of the first artistic groups in post-war Poland. Broll was a co-founder and active member. The group's first unofficial exhibition took place in 1953 in Brad, then in 1954 in Katowice. The artist showed there simplified Still Life from 1953 to 1954, which resulted from a logical conceptual analysis of the studied subjects. The intermingling systems of lines and arcs, the unfolding in space of complementary crystals of the form, through a thorough analysis of small particles of the structure, gives these canvases a strict composition discipline, a feature that has become paramount to almost all the artist's works created during this period. The painting series is coming from a later period of St-53 titled Paradoxes of spaces showing the artist's searching in research of the behaviour of space, intermingling planes and multidimensional reality. Other important cycles in her work include Afterimages referring to the work of Strzemiński, however, presenting visual impressions as colour effects, and Biological Compositions.

After the group's presentations at Galeria Krzywe Koło (Crooked Circle Gallery) in Warsaw, Julian Przyboś wrote: "Urszula Broll is undoubtedly the most sensitive to color. She, one of her colleagues, builds some pictures only with color, you can see even more clearly about her sensitivity to shape by looking at the planes in her paintings, where colour is not a building factor, but a value".

In the years 1958-1959, the artist creates the Transformations series, focusing her interests around matter painting. Then the series Aliquots (1960-1964), which is a continuation of matter painting with musical connotations. The group Oneiron (1967-1973) is created in the studio of Broll and Urbanowicz as a result of meetings of friends with similar interests and attitudes. They are: Antoni Halor, Zygmunt Stuchlik, Henryk Waniek, Mr. and Mrs. Urbanowicz. Oneiron was a discussion circle, a place of exploration and spiritual experience. Their attention was focused on visual and mental experiments, secret knowledge, magic, alchemy, philosophy and religion of the Far East. The joint work of the group was, among others, Lexicon. Encyclopaedia of Symbols and the so-called black cards (70 x 70 cm cardboard boxes, each of which had an assigned letter of the alphabet and a strictly defined color scheme). "Broll, originally impressed by the psychology of CG Jung, was looking for artistic translations of her own consciousness and different perception of the outside world. Her interests extend to the areas of art with a spiritual dimension". She creates watercolour mandalas spontaneously as a part of discovering her own awareness and the ability to "look not only at myself". Delving into her own mind and the inner world of experiences, the artist comes closer to Zen, and the Urbanowicz studio becomes a center of Buddhist culture.

Since 1983, when the artist lived in Przesieka near Jelenia Góra, her work focuses on watercolors - mandalas, drawings, works that she names "by gesture" and universal views located beyond time and place. "I don’t paint symbols. I paint shapes and I don’t look for parallels between shapes on a plane. I look at it holistically. I paint with my own watercolor-based technique. This is a separate language - deeply meditative insights. Something beyond words and reasoning".

=== Exhibitions ===
Broll’s work is associated with two environments, Katowice and Jelenia Góra. During the last years of her life, she was associated with Art Gallery BWA in Jelenia Góra. She took part in many individual and collective exhibitions in Poland, the Czech Republic, France, Japan, Germany, Sweden and the USA. A retrospective exhibition of her acquis in 2005 was prepared by BWA in Jelenia Góra and BWA in Katowice. The curator of the exhibition and the scientific editor of the catalog was prof. Janusz Zagrodzki. The summary and comprehensive review of Urszula Broll’s work was organized by the Katarzyna Kozyra Foundation in Warsaw in 2020. Curator of the project entitled Atman means Breath was Katarzyna Kucharska. The exhibition under the same title was presented by the Xawery Dunikowski Museum of Sculpture in Królikarnia, branch of the National Museum, Warsaw, after the artist’s death.

== See also ==
- List of Polish artists
- Buddhism

== Bibliography ==
- "Wonderful landscape. Artists and artistic colonies in Karkonosze in the 20th century", publ. Gesellschaft fur Kulturaustausch e. V., Berlin, Karkonosze Museum in Jelenia Góra, 1999
- "Katowice underground after 1953", pub. BWA Katowice, 2004
- "Urszula Broll", exhibition catalog, pub. BWA Jelenia Góra, 2005
- "Faces of art in the current Silesian Voivodeship in 1945-1975", Katowice 2017
- "Atman means Breath", publ. Katarzyna Kozyra Foundation, Warsaw 2019
