= Rzecko =

- Village
- Location within Poland
- Coordinates: 53°10′25″N 15°31′55″E
- Country: Poland
- Voivodeship: West Pomeranian
- County: Choszczno
- Gmina: Choszczno

Rzecko [ˈʐɛt͡skɔ] (German: Rietzig) is a village in the administrative district of Gmina Choszczno, within Choszczno County, West Pomeranian Voivodeship, in north-western Poland. It lies approximately 8 km (5 mi) east of Choszczno (Arnswalde) and 69 km (43 mi) south-east of the regional capital Szczecin (Stettin).

Wardynka flows through the village.

For the history of the region, see History of Pomerania.
