= Zwierzynek =

Zwierzynek may refer to the following places:

- Zwierzynek, Pomeranian Voivodeship (north Poland)
- Zwierzynek, Choszczno County in West Pomeranian Voivodeship (north-west Poland)
- Zwierzynek, West Pomeranian Voivodeship (north-west Poland)
