= Smolen (surname) =

Smolen or Smoleń is a surname. Notable people with the surname include:

- Bohdan Smoleń (1947–2016), Polish comedian and actor
- Kazimierz Smoleń (1920–2012), Polish political prisoner and museum director
- Michal Smolen (born 1993), American canoeist
- Mike Smolen (1940–1992), American bridge player
- Molly Smolen, American ballet dancer
- Stanisław Smoleń (born 1952), Polish diplomat
- Tomasz Smoleń (born 1983), Polish racing cyclist
- Vivian Smolen (1916–2006), American radio actress
