= Radlice =

Radlice may refer to the following places:

- Radlice (Prague), Czech Republic
- Radlice, Pyrzyce County, Poland
- Radlice, Choszczno County, Poland
