= Kolki (disambiguation) =

Kolki is a village development committee (administrative subdivision) in Nepal.

Kolki may also refer to:

- Kołki, a village in Poland
- Kolki, a village in Rajkot district, Gujarat, India
- Kolki, Ukraine, a village or town depopulated of Jews during the Holocaust by the Nazis
- Kolki, Lord of Chaos in the multiplayer fantasy role-playing game Order & Chaos Online
