= Przywodzie =

Przywodzie may refer to the following places:

- Przywodzie, Choszczno County in West Pomeranian Voivodeship (north-west Poland)
- Przywodzie, Gmina Lipiany in West Pomeranian Voivodeship (north-west Poland)
- Przywodzie, Gmina Przelewice in West Pomeranian Voivodeship (north-west Poland)
