= List of shipwrecks in April 1890 =

The list of shipwrecks in April 1890 includes ships sunk, foundered, grounded, or otherwise lost during April 1890.

== 1 April ==
List of shipwrecks: 1 April 1890
Ship	State	Description
Mysore	United Kingdom	The full-rigged ship was sighted off Staten Island, New York, United States. She was on a voyage from Liverpool, Lancashire, to Iquique, Chile. No further trace, reported missing.
Ystad	Sweden	The steamship ran aground on Eel Kaken, off Åhus. She was refloated with the assistance of a tug and towed in to Åhus in a leaky condition.
Unnamed	French Navy	The gunboat foundered in the English Channel. She was being towed from Le Havre, Seine-Inférieure to Cherbourg, Manche.

== 2 April ==
List of shipwrecks: 2 April 1890
Ship	State	Description
Garnet	United Kingdom	The steamship was driven ashore on the Mull of Galloway, Wigtownshire.

== 3 April ==
List of shipwrecks: 3 April 1890
Ship	State	Description
J. D. Coleman	United States	The steamship sprang a leak and sank in Albemarle Sound. She was on a voyage from Norfolk, Virginia to East Chicago, Indiana.
La Plata, and Marima	Italy; Argentina	The barque La Plata and the steamship Marima collided at Buenos Aires. La Plata sank. Marima was damaged. She was taken in to La Boca, where she struck a submerged object ahd had to be beached.

== 4 April ==
List of shipwrecks: 4 April 1890
Ship	State	Description
Emblem	United Kingdom	The brigantine was wrecked on a reef near the Isle des Avis, Venezuela. Her crew were rescued a week later by RMS Moselle (United Kingdom), which landed the crew at Plymouth, Devon. She was on a voyage from Hamburg, Germany to Curaçao.
George Locket	United Kingdom	The steamship ran aground at Boulmer, Northumberland. She was on a voyage from London to Burntisland, Fife. She was refloated with the assistance of a tug and put in to the River Tyne.
Marion	United Kingdom	The steamship collided with two or three boats at Cardiff, Glamorgan, sinking them and pushing her anchor through her bow. She was consequently beached.
Martha	United Kingdom	The ship ran aground and sank in the Solway Firth. She was on a voyage from Liverpool, Lancashire to Dalbeattie, Kirkcudbrightshire.
Minotaur	United Kingdom	The galley collided with the steamship Holmrook (United Kingdom) and sank off Deal, Kent with the loss of two of her three crew. The survivor was rescued by Holmrook.

== 5 April ==
List of shipwrecks: 5 April 1890
Ship	State	Description
Johannes	Denmark	The schooner ran aground at the mouth of the Crampe, Germany. She was on a voyage from Swinemünde to Stettin.
Seitz Maru	Japan	The steamship exploded and caught fire with the loss of 25 lives. She was on a voyage from a Japanese port to a Korean port.

== 6 April ==
List of shipwrecks: 6 April 1890
Ship	State	Description
August et Louise	France	The schooner was driven ashore and wrecked on the west coast of Guernsey, Channel Islands. Her crew were rescued. She was on a voyage from Morlaix, Finistère to Boulogne, Pas-de-Calais.
Cabo Quejo	Spain	The steamship ran aground at Sanlúcar de Barrameda. She was refloated on 8 April.
Caloceer	United Kingdom	The schooner was wrecked on the south coast of the Isle of Wight. Her crew were rescued by the Brighstone Lifeboat.
Cameo	United Kingdom	The ketch was wrecked on the south coast of the Isle of Wight. Her crew survived.
Lizzy Dunlop	United Kingdom	The schooner was wrecked on the south coast of the Isle of Wight. Her crew were rescued by the Brighstone Lifeboat.
Melita	Germany	The steamship ran aground at Hiogo, Japan. She was a total loss.

== 7 April ==
List of shipwrecks: 7 April 1890
Ship	State	Description
Bella	United Kingdom	The schooner was driven ashore at "Castlehill".
Bolivar	France	The barque put in to Cascais, Portugal in a leaky condition and sank there. She was on a voyage from Cádiz to Ferrol, Spain.
Catherine Latham	United Kingdom	The ship was driven ashore at Islandmagee, County Antrim. She was on a voyage from the Point of Ayr, Flintshire to Rathmullen, County Donegal.
Flora	Germany	The schooner was driven ashore at Kalmar, Sweden. She was on a voyage from Hamburg to Ekenäs, Sweden.
Formica	Norway	The steamship ran aground at the Lista Lighthouse. She was on a voyage from Liverpool, Lancashire, United Kingdom to Stockholm, Sweden.
Formosa	United Kingdom	The Thames barge capsized off the Swin Middle Lightship ( Trinity House). Her crew were rescued by the steamship Eider (Flag unknown_.
Molilamo	Norway	The barque was driven ashore at Dungeness, Kent, United Kingdom. She was refloated on 9 April and proceeded for London, United Kingdom.
Natal	United Kingdom	The schooner ran aground on the Crumstone Rock, in the Farne Islands, Northumberland. She was on a voyage from Great Yarmouth, Norfolk to Sunderland, County Durham. She was refloated the next day with the assistance of some fishing boats and taken in to North Sunderland, Berwickshire.
Orient	United Kingdom	The steam launch was driven ashore and severely damaged in Ashton Bay, Renfrewshire.
Union	Spain	The ship was driven ashore at "Beauduc", Bouches-du-Rhône, France. She was a total loss.

== 8 April ==
List of shipwrecks: 8 April 1890
Ship	State	Description
Abbey Holm	United Kingdom	The barque was driven ashore at South Shields, County Durham. All on board were rescued. She was being towed from Leith, Lothian to Middlesbrough, Yorkshire. She subsequently broke up.
Aurania	United Kingdom	The smack collided with the smack Iona (United Kingdom) and sank in the North Sea. Her crew were rescued by the smack Queen of the Fleet (United Kingdom).
Garland	United Kingdom	The fishing boat foundered in the North Sea with the loss of all seven crew.
Melilame	Flag unknown	The ship was driven ashore at Dungeness, Kent, United Kingdom. She was on a voyage from London, United Kingdom to Montevideo, Uruguat.
Watson	United Kingdom	The sloop sank in the North Sea off Skegness, Lincolnshire. All four people on board were rescued by the Skegness Lifeboat Ann, John & Mary ( Royal National Lifeboat Institution).
Unnamed	Canada	The schooner was wrecked at Goderich, Ontario with the loss of three lives.

== 9 April ==
List of shipwrecks: 9 April 1890
Ship	State	Description
Agnes Lydnay Bede	United Kingdom	The schooner was driven ashore at Aberthan, Glamorgan.
Rock City	Norway	The ship was wrecked on the Shipwash Sand, in the North Sea off the coast of Suffolk, United Kingdom. Her thirteen crew were rescued by the Aldeburgh Lifeboat George Hounsfield ( Royal National Lifeboat Institution). Rock City was on a voyage from Christiania to London, United Kingdom.
Rossia	Russia	The steamship was driven ashore at Jarrow, Northumberland, United Kingdom.
Sparta	Germany	The steamship ran aground at Grado, Italy. She was on a voyage from Hamburg to Trieste. She was refloated and completed her voyage.

== 10 April ==
List of shipwrecks: 10 April 1890
Ship	State	Description
Aconcagua	United Kingdom	The barque caught fire in the Irish Sea and was abandoned. Her crew were rescued by the barque Circassia (Norway), which put a salvage crew aboard. Aconcagua was towed in to Limerick. She was on a voyage from Glasgow, Renfrewshire to Mauritius. The fire was extinguished on 12 April.
Allethea, Llewellyn, and Minnie Sommers	United Kingdom	The barque Llewellyn was run into by Allethea in The Downs. Both vessels were then run into by Minnie Sommers. Llewellyn was on a voyage from Coquimbo, Chile to Middlesbrough, Yorkshire. Allethea was on a voyage from Huelva, Spain to Great Yarmouth, Norfolk.
Avoca, and North Cambria	United Kingdom	The steamships collided off Dungeness, Kent. Avoca sank 6 nautical miles (11 km) south of Sandgate, Kent. North Cambria was severely damaged. All 45 passengers and crew from Avoca were rescued by North Cambria. North Cambria was on a voyage from Baltimore, Maryland, United States to Hamburg, Germany. She put in to Dover, Kent.
Camida	United Kingdom	The fishing smack collided with a steamship off Smith's Knoll, in the North Sea off the coast of Norfolk and sank. Her crew were rescued.
Prosperity	United Kingdom	The ship caught fire at sea and was beached at Hunstanton, Norfolk. Her crew were rescued. She was on a voyage from Dundee, Forfarshire to Boston, Lincolnshire. She was a total loss.

== 11 April ==
List of shipwrecks: 11 April 1890
Ship	State	Description
Golden Horn	United Kingdom	The steamship ran aground on Hammond's Knowl, in the North Sea off the coast of Norfolk. Her 23 crew reached the Lemon and Ower Lightship ( Trinity House), from where they were rescued by the steamship Voorwaarts (Netherlands). Golden Horn was on a voyage from South Shields, County Durham to Savona, Italy. She was refloated and towed in to Great Yarmouth, Norfolk in a leaky condition.
Ondine	Netherlands	The steamship ran aground in the Elbe at Finkenwerder, Germany. She was on a voyage from Amsterdam, North Holland to Hamburg, Germany. She was refloated.

== 12 April ==
List of shipwrecks: 12 April 1890
Ship	State	Description
Admiral Rooke	United Kingdom	The steamship ran aground near Huelva, Spain. All on board were rescued. She was subsequently damaged by weather, broke her back and was a total loss.
Countess of Lonsdale	United Kingdom	The schooner collided with the steamship Sherbrough (United Kingdom) and sank in Liverpool Bay off the North West Lightship ( Trinity House) with the loss of all hands.
Ethel	United Kingdom	The schooner was wrecked at Cape Canaveral, Florida, United States with the loss of all hands.
Koh-i-noor	United Kingdom	The schooner ran aground on Sarn Badrig and sank. Her crew survived. She was on a voyage from Aberystwyth, Cardiganshire to Aberdovey, Caernarfonshire.
Shenango	United States	The steam barge caught fire and sank off Erie, Pennsylvania.
Star of Gwent	United Kingdom	The cutter collided with the tug Prince of Wales (United Kingdom) and sank in the Bristol Channel between Morte Point and Lundy Island, Devon. Her crew were rescued.
Swiftsure	United Kingdom	The steamship ran aground on the East Hoyle Bank, in Liverpool Bay.
Umvolosi	United Kingdom	The steamship struck an uncharted rock and was beached at Grahamstown, Cape Colony. All on board were rescued. She was on a voyage from London to Port Natal, Cape Colony.

== 13 April ==
List of shipwrecks: 13 April 1890
Ship	State	Description
Favonian	United Kingdom	The steamship ran aground on the Burbo Bank, in Liverpool Bay. She was on a voyage from Fiume, Austria-Hungary to Liverpool, Lancashire.
Hero	Sweden	The schooner ran aground on the Lillegrunden, in the Great Belt.
Papellio	United Kingdom	The pilot cutter was driven ashore and wrecked at Cardiff, Glamorgan.

== 14 April ==
List of shipwrecks: 14 April 1890
Ship	State	Description
Cambrian	United Kingdom	The steamship ran aground on the Blyth Sands, in the Thames Estuary. She was refloated the next day and resumed her voyage.
Catharina	Netherlands	The galiot ran aground at Teignmouth, Devon, United Kingdom.
Ethel A. Merritt	United States	The ship collided with another vessel and sank. She was on a voyage from Philadelphia, Pennsylvania to San Andreas.
Plover	United Kingdom	The steamship ran aground on the Inch Sands, in Liverpool Bay. She was on a voyage from "Western Point" to Liverpool, Lancashire.
Straits of Gibraltar	United Kingdom	The steamship was damaged by ice and put in to Louisbourg, Nova Scotia, Canada, where she was beached. She was on a voyage from London to New York, United States.
Thursby	United Kingdom	The steamship ran aground on the Inch Sands. She was on a voyage from "Western Point" to Garston, Lancashire.

== 15 April ==
List of shipwrecks: 15 April 1890
Ship	State	Description
Chollerton	United Kingdom	The steamship was driven ashore at Suakim, Mahdist State. She was on a voyage from Blyth, Northumberland to Suakim. She was refloated and taken in to Suakim.
Christana	Germany	The galliot ran aground at Teignmouth, Devon, United Kingdom. She was on a voyage from London to Teignmouth. She was refloated and taken in to Teignmouth in a leaky condition.
Ernst Robert	Sweden	The steam galeass ran aground at Söderhamn and was beached. She was on a voyage from "Raslagen" to "Galtstroom".
J. H. Chadwick	United States	The barque wa driven ashore and wrecked 8 nautical miles (15 km) north of Bahía Blanca, Brazil. She was on a voyage from Bahía Blanca to Barbados.
Mirzapore	United Kingdom	The barque was driven ashore in the River Thames at Greenhithe, Kent. She was refloated.
Morwenna	United Kingdom	The schooner struck the Welloe Rock, off Cudden Point, Cornwall. She put in to Penzance, Cornwall in a leaky condition.

== 16 April ==
List of shipwrecks: 16 April 1890
Ship	State	Description
Claus	Sweden	The schooner ran aground on the Hittarps Reef, off the Swedish coast. She was on a voyage from Hull, Yorkshire, United Kingdom to Gefle.
Dagny	Sweden	The barque sprang a leak and foundered off Almería, Spain. Her crew were rescued by the steamship Danish Monarch (United Kingdom).
Fair Chance	United Kingdom	The fishing boat was run down and sunk in the North Sea 6 nautical miles (11 km) off Buckie, Aberdeenshire by Olive (United Kingdom). Her crew were rescued by Olive.
Frankfort	Germany	The steamship ran aground off Norrköping, Sweden. She was refloated on 22 April and taken in to Noorköping.
Liberal	Norway	The schooner caught fire at North Shields, Northumberland, United Kingdom. The fire was extinguished; she was severely damaged at the stern.
Magdalina	Norway	The barque collided with an iceberg in the Atlantic Ocean (53°55′N 39°11′W) and was abandoned by her nine crew. They were rescued by RMS Umbria (United Kingdom). Magdalina was on a voyage from Pensacola, Florida, United States to Amsterdam, North Holland. Netherlands.
Sunflower	United Kingdom	The steamship sprang a leak and was beached at Ringford Point, Kirkcudbrightshire. Her crew were rescued. She was on a voyage from Glenarm, County Antrim to Glasgow, Renfrewshire. Although reported to be a total loss, She was beached at Carnlough, County Antrim for repairs on 5 July.

== 17 April ==
List of shipwrecks: 17 April 1890
Ship	State	Description
Altyre, and Euclid	United Kingdom	The steamships collided in the North Sea off Hartlepool, County Durham. Euclid sank with the loss of four of her crew. Survivors were rescued by Altyre. Euclid was on a voyage from Sunderland, County Durham to Rochester, Kent. Altyre was on a voyage from Middlesbrough, Yorkshire to Aberdeen. She was severely damaged and put in to the River Tyne.
Elizabeth Peers	United Kingdom	The ship ran aground at Wells-next-the-Sea, Norfolk. She was on a voyage from Dublin to Wells-next-the-Sea. She was refloated and beached at Holkham, Norfolk.
Quilotta	France	The barque collided with the steamship Concordia (France) and was abandoned by her crew, who were rescued by Concordia. Quilotta was on a voyage from Dakar, Senega to Mobile, Alabama, United States.

== 18 April ==
List of shipwrecks: 18 April 1890
Ship	State	Description
Bernadine	Belgium	The cutter was run down and sunk 22 nautical miles (41 km) off Vlissingen, Zeeland, Netherlands by the steamship Northcote (United Kingdom) with the loss of five of her six crew.
Julia Weiner	United Kingdom	The steamship capsized and sank in the North Sea 25 nautical miles (46 km) off Spurn Head, Yorkshire with the loss of eleven of her fourteen crew. The survivors were rescued by the fishing smack Dart (United Kingdom). Julia Weiner was on a voyage from South Shields, County Durham to London.
Karl	Sweden	The schooner was driven ashore at "Vestergarnsholm". She was on a voyage from Visby to Neustadt.
Mary Ann	United Kingdom	The barge was run into by the steamship Edith (United Kingdom) and sank in the River Thames at Coalhouse Fort, Essex with the loss of three of her four crew.
Newbattle	United Kingdom	The steamship was driven ashore at Svaneke, Denmark. Her crew were rescued. She was on a voyage from Danzig, Germany to Liverpool, Lancashire. She was condemned.
Odin	Germany	The ship was driven ashore and wrecked at Stubbenkammer.
Osprey	United Kingdom	The steamship ran aground on the Luchsand.
Polo	Flag unknown	The steamship ran aground at Christiania, Norway. She was refloated.
Rurik	Sweden	The steamship was driven ashore at Visby. She was on a voyave from Libau, Germany to Stockholm. She was refloated and taken in to Visby in a leaky condition.
Wetherby	United Kingdom	The steamship collided with the steamship Sultan (United Kingdom) and ran aground in the Elbe at Wittenberg, Germany. Wetherby was on a voyage from Hamburg, Germany to Philadelphia, Pennsylvania, United States.
Wydale	United Kingdom	The steamship ran aground in the Elbe at Finkenwerder, Germany. She was on a voyage from New Orleans, Louisiana, United States to Hamburg. She was refloated the next day and towed in to Hamburg.
Vulture	United Kingdom	The schooner was damaged by fire at Liverpool, Lancashire.

== 19 April ==
List of shipwrecks: 19 April 1890
Ship	State	Description
Boy Ernest	United Kingdom	The smack ran aground on the Cross Sand, in the North Sea off the coast of Norfolk and capsized. Her six crew were rescued by the Caister Lifeboat Convent Garden ( Royal National Lifeboat Institution).
Covetina	United Kingdom	The steamship was driven ashore on Scharhörn, Germany.

== 20 April ==
List of shipwrecks: 20 April 1890
Ship	State	Description
Bahia	Brazil	The steamship collided with the steamship Maranhão (Brazil) at Rio de Janeiro and was beached.
Hoffnung	Netherlands	The tjalk collided with the steamship Chala (United Kingdom) in the Elbe and was severely damaged.
Meteor	Germany	The barque departed from Blyth, Northumberland, United Kingdom for Iquique, Chile. No further trace, reported missing.
Relief	United Kingdom	The tug sank at Blackwall, London.
Wasp	United Kingdom	The ferry collided with the tug Iron King (United Kingdom) in the River Mersey and was severely damaged. Her passengers were taken off by the tug Mersey King (United Kingdom) and she was taken in tow by the tug Sea King (United Kingdom).

== 21 April ==
List of shipwrecks: 21 April 1890
Ship	State	Description
Æolus	Norway	The schooner ran aground. She was on a voyage from an English port to Drontheim. She was refloated and put in to Smolen in a leaky condition.
Alderney	United Kingdom	The steamship ran aground at Hamble Point, Hampshire. She was on a voyage from Southampton, Hampshire to Cherbourg, Seine-Inférieure, France. She was refloated and resumed her voyage.
Bertie	United Kingdom	The Thames barge was run into and sunk by the steamship Kello (United Kingdom) at Wapping, London.
Brankelow	United Kingdom	The steamship, chartered by the Russian government, went ashore on Loe Bar, Cornwall during a gale. Her crew were rescued by rocket apparatus. She was on a voyage from Cardiff, Glamorgan to Kronstadt, Russia. She was carrying 3,000 tons of coal which was salvaged along with her engines.
Coventina	United Kingdom	The steamship was driven ashore on Scharhörn, Germany. She was refloated with the assistance of a steamship and put back to Cuxhaven.
Ehen, or Ehu	France	The barque was driven ashore at Portland Bill, Dorset, United Kingdom. Eleven people were rescued. She was on a voyage from Bremen, Germany to Bordeaux, Gironde. She subsequently broke up.
Jane Elizabeth	United Kingdom	The smack was wrecked at Emanuel Head, Lindisfarne, Northumberland. Her crew were rescued.
Liberte	United Kingdom	The schooner foundered in the Firth of Forth. Her crew survived. She was on a voyage from Morrisonhaven to London.
Monarch	United Kingdom	The ketch ran aground on the Thurleston Sand, off the coast of Devon. She was on a voyage from Poole, Dorset to Swansea, Glamorgan.
Ordonez	Spain	The steamship was run into by the steamship Romulus (Spain) and sank at Manila, Spanish East Indies. All on board were rescued.
Phœbus	Norway	The brig was driven ashore and wrecked 3 nautical miles (5.6 km) west of Dunkerque, Nord, France. She was on a voyage from Christiansund to Dunkerque.
Sophia	Norway	The barque was damaged by fire at Cape Town, Cape Colon.
Tetuan	United Kingdom	The steamship was driven ashore and wrecked in the Loochoo Islands.
Unnamed	United Kingdom	The barge was run into by the tug Cleveland (United Kingdom) and sank in the River Tees at Redcar, Yorkshire with the loss of both crew.

== 22 April ==
List of shipwrecks: 22 April 1890
Ship	State	Description
Lahneck	Germany	The steamship ran aground at Amble, Northumberland, United Kingdom.
Lord Beresford	United Kingdom	The steamship ran aground on the Longsand, in the North Sea off the coast of Essex. She was on a voyage from Ostend, West Flanders, Belgium to London. She was refloated and towed in to the River Thames in a leaky condition.
Newport	United Kingdom	The steamship foundered in the North Sea off Red Head, Forfarshire. Her nine crew survived. She was on a voyage from the Firth of Forth to Aberdeen.
Rob Roy	United Kingdom	The tug caught fire and sank off Barry, Glamorgan. Her crew survived.
Ulysses	United Kingdom	The steamship was driven ashore and wrecked at "Tannabe", Japan. All on board were rescued. She was on a voyage from Yokohama, Japan to London

== 23 April ==
List of shipwrecks: 23 April 1890
Ship	State	Description
Cora	United States	The full-rigged ship was driven ashore on Skagen, Denmark. She was on a voyage from New Orleans, Louisiana to Saint Petersburg, Russia. Her crew were taken off the next day. She was later refloated and taken in to Copenhagen, where she arrived on 5 May.
Corea	United States	The barque ran aground on a sandbar 6 nautical miles (11 km) south of Kalgin Island, District of Alaska. She was refloated and found to be leaky. She sailed 25 nautical miles (46 km) in a sinking condition and was beached on the eastern shore of Cook Inlet. All 116 people on board survived, but she was deemed a total loss. Corea was on a voyage from San Francisco, California to the Cook Inlet.
Eusemere	United Kingdom	The steamship ran aground on the Palmyras Shoals, off Short Island, India. Her crew were rescued. She was on a voyage from Liverpool, Lancashire to Calcutta, India.
President V. Rijekevorsel	Netherlands	The barque was driven ashore on Skagen, Denmark.
Speedwell	United Kingdom	The tug ran aground and capsized at Barry, Glamorgan. She was refloated.
Vinco	United Kingdom	The schooner collided with the steamship Winsloe (United Kingdom) and sank at the Nore with the loss of two of her crew. Survivors were rescued by Winsloe.

== 24 April ==
List of shipwrecks: 24 April 1890
Ship	State	Description
Good Hope	United Kingdom	The steamship ran aground at Bristol, Gloucestershire. She was refloated.
Intrepid	(United Kingdom of Great Britain and Ireland) Guernsey	The ship departed from A Coruña, Spain for Guernsey. No further trace, reported missing.
Kalligunge	India	The flat sank in the Hooghly River.
Lloyds	United Kingdom	The steamship was run into by the steamship Gulf of Papua (United Kingdom) in the River Thames at East Greenwich, London. She was beached at Horkness Point and consequently sank.
Noston	Norway	The schooner was wrecked at Alvarado. Her crew were rescued.
Paraense	United Kingdom	The steamship ran aground on the Plockington Bank, in Liverpool Bay. She was on a voyage from Ceará, Brazil to Liverpool, Lancashire. She was refloated with assistance.
Polynesia	Germany	The barque ran onto rocks at the Birling Gap, Sussex, United Kingdom. She was on a voyage from Iquique, Peru to Hamburg. Her crew were rescued by the Newhaven Lifeboat Michael Henry ( Royal National Lifeboat Institution). Polynesia was refloated on 4 May with assistance from the tug Lady Vita (United Kingdom) and beached at Cuckmere Haven, Sussex. She broke up in a gale on 20 May.
Welsh Prince	United Kingdom	The steamship ran aground in the Kingroad. She was on a voyage from Bristol, Gloucestershire to Newport, Monmouthshire.

== 25 April ==
List of shipwrecks: 25 April 1890
Ship	State	Description
Kildare	United Kingdom	The steamship ran aground at Liverpool, Lancashire. She was on a voyage from Dublin to Liverpool.
MacArthur	United States	The tug was destroyed by fire at Milwaukee, Wisconsin.

== 26 April ==
List of shipwrecks: 26 April 1890
Ship	State	Description
Alpha	Sweden	The schooner was wrecked at "Sturks". Her crew were rescued.
Copernicus	Germany	The steamship ran aground at Pillau Haff. She was on a voyage from Königsberg to Rotterdam, South Holland, Netherlands. She was refloated.
Onieda	United States	The ship sank in the North Pacific Ocean after striking "Harnings Rock" – probably a rock that was named Onieda Rock in 1901 (54°28′20″N 162°55′40″W) – 10 nautical miles (19 km) southwest of Sanak Island, in the Aleutian Islands, District of Alaska with the loss of 77 of the 155 people on board. She was on a voyage from San Francisco, California, to Thin Point (54.9628°N 162.5672°W), District of Alaska.

== 27 April ==
List of shipwrecks: 27 April 1890
Ship	State	Description
Handy	Norway	The schooner ran aground on the English Bank, in the River Plate. She was on a voyage from Liverpool, Lancashire, United Kingdom to Paysandú, Uruguay.
Ocean King	United Kingdom	The steamship ran aground at "Ljushagen. She was refloated with assistance and resumed her voyage.
Rothiemay	United Kingdom	The steamship was driven ashore in the Dardanelles. She was on a voyage from Barry, Glamorgan to Galaţi, Romania.
Sieverine	Germany	The schooner ran aground at Emden and sank. Her crew were rescued. She was on a voyage from an English port to Norderney.

== 28 April ==
List of shipwrecks: 28 April 1890
Ship	State	Description
Jacobus Johannes	Netherlands	The ship was driven ashore at Cape Town, Cape Colonhy.
Unnamed	Flag unknown	The steamship was driven ashore on Samsø, Denmark.

== 29 April ==
List of shipwrecks: 29 April 1890
Ship	State	Description
Alma	Sweden	The ship capsized off Eskholmen and subsequently came ashore at Lucernan.
H. B. Plant	United States	The steamship was destroyed by fire on Lake Beneford, Florida with the loss of three or four lives. She was on a voyage from Jacksonvill to Sanford, Florida.

== 30 April ==
List of shipwrecks: 30 April 1890
Ship	State	Description
Birchfield	United Kingdom	The steamship ran aground in the Elbe. She was refloated on 2 May.
Corrientes	Germany	The steamship ran aground on the Tagus Rock off Montevideo, Uruguay. She was subsequently wrecked in a pampero. All on board were rescued.
Lucy	United Kingdom	The tug was run into by the steamship Kingsbridge Packet (United Kingdom) and sank in Plymouth Sound. Her crew were rescued by Kingsbridge Packet. Lucy was refloated on 5 May.
San Antonio	United Kingdom	The schooner was driven ashore and wrecked at Larache, Morocco.
Valkyrie	Norway	The barque was driven ashore on Skagen, Denmark. She was on a voyage from Montevideo, Uruguay to Saint Petersburg, Russia.

== Unknown date ==
List of shipwrecks: Unknown date in April 1890
Ship	State	Description
Achilles	United Kingdom	The steamship ran aground on the Chapman Sand, in the Thames Estuary. She was refloated on 25 April with the assistance of a tug.
Adamant	United Kingdom	The ship was wrecked at Valparaíso, Chile. Her crew were rescued. She was on a voyage from Hamburg, Germany to Valparaíso.
Aglaia	Norway	The brig was abandoned in the North Sea. She was towed in to Grimsby, Lincolnshire, United Kingdom on 11 April.
Amalia Vlassopulo	Greece	The steamship ran aground in the Danube 40 nautical miles (74 km) from its mouth. She was on a voyage from Brăila, Romania to Rotterdam, South Holland, Netherlads. She was refloated on 21 April.
Angomes	Chilean Navy	The cruiser was wrecked in Chilean waters whilst searching for survivors from the steamship Gulf of Aden (United Kingdom).
Annie May	Canada	The schooner was lost off Cod Roy Island, Quebec with the loss of all four crew.
Bergenseren	Norway	The barque was driven ashore and wrecked on "Candeleur Island". She was on a voyage from Buenos Aires, Argentina to Pascagoula, Mississippi, United States.
Bessie	Western Australia	The brigantine was destroyed by fire at Sourabaya, Netherlands East Indies.
Bewick	United Kingdom	The steamship ran aground at Gibraltar.
Bilbao	United Kingdom	The steamship foundered in the North Sea between 8 and 20 April with the loss of all seventeen people on board. She was on a voyage from Grimsby to London.
Cambrian Duchess	United Kingdom	The full-rigged ship foundered at sea with the loss of one of her 24 crew. She was on a voyage from Swansea, Glamorgan to Iquique, Peru.
Canton	France	The steamship ran aground near Marseille, Bouches-du-Rhône. She was later refloated.
Cayuga	United States	The steamship was driven ashore at Buffalo, New York and was severely damaged.
Chenange	Canada	The steamship was destroyed by fire off Erie, Pennsylvania, United States.
City of Lincoln	Flag unknown	The steamship was driven ashore in the Mississippi River downstream of New Orleans, Louisiana, United States. She was refloated.
City of New York	United States	The steamship foundered in Lake Michigan with the loss of all twenty crew.
David Clarkson	United States	The schooner was abandoned in the Atlantic Ocean before 7 April.
Elginshire	United Kingdom	The steamship was driven ashore at Vera Cruz, Mexico. She was on a voyage from Swansea, Glamorgan to Vera Cruz. She subsequently sank.
Emilie	Nicaragua	The ship foundered at sea with some loss of life before 14 April. Four of her crew were rescued.
Hawarden, and Lancashire	United Kingdom	The steamship Hawarden was run into by the steamship Lancashire at Baltimore, Maryland, United States. Both vessels were damaged and put in to Baltimore. Hawarden was on a voyage from Baltimore to Cork. Lancashire was on a voyage from Cardiff, Glamorgan to Baltimore.
Isaac	United Kingdom	The schooner ran aground on Amack Island, Denmark. She was on a voyage from Riga, Russia to Hull, Yorkshire. She was refloated with assistance and resumed her voyage.
Isipingo	United Kingdom	The barque was driven ashore at Port Natal. She was refloated.
Italia	United Kingdom	The steamship was wrecked on Watling's Island, Bahamas with the loss of one of her thirteen crew. She was on a voyage from New York to Jamaica.
J. A. Gripestedt	Sweden	The steamship ran aground at Nesodden, Norway. She was refloated and taken in to Christiania, Norway.
Janet Cowan	United Kingdom	The ship was abandoned at sea before 29 April. All on board were rescued by Hanover (Flag unknown). Janet Cowan was on a voyage from the River Tyne to Valparaíso, Chile.
Jardin de Maquinista	Flag unknown	The ship foundered in the North Sea off Texel, North Holland, Netherlands before 14 April.
Joseph	France	The brigantine was driven ashore and wrecked at Saint-Pierre, Saint Pierre and Miquelon with the loss of her captain. She was on a voyage from Cádiz, Spain to Saint-Pierre.
Martha	Germany	The steamship was driven ashore at Vera Cruz, Mexico. She was a total loss. Also reported as wrecked on the Onegada Reef.
Natalis	United Kingdom	The schooner was driven ashore on the coast of Berwickshire. She was refloated on 8 April and taken in to North Sunderland in a severely leaky condition.
Navarre	United Kingdom	The steamship was driven ashore at Troon, Ayrshire. She was refloated with the assistance of two tugs on 3 April and taken in to Troon in a severely leaky condition.
Newchwang	United Kingdom	The steamship was driven ashore at Quemoy,China.
Panama	France	The steamship was driven ashore on Long Island, New York, United States. She was driven further ashore on 5 April.
Perim	Russia	The steamship was driven ashore and severely damaged at Kertch. She was on a voyage from Venice, Italy to Kertch. She was refloated on 16 April.
Propontis	United Kingdom	The steamship ran aground at Amasuka, Japan. She was refloated and taken in to Nagasaki.
Sarah Godfrey	United Kingdom	The schooner was abandoned at sea. She was towed in to Cape Frio, Brazil on 16 April.
Sindoro	Netherlands East Indies	The steamship ran aground at Menado. She was refloated.
Valkyrie	Norway	The ship was wreckedat Bahía Blanca, Brazil. Her crew were rescued. She was on a voyage from Sharpness, Gloucestershire, United Kingdom to Bahía Blanca.
