= Johann Timotheus Hermes =

German poet, novelist and Protestant theologian

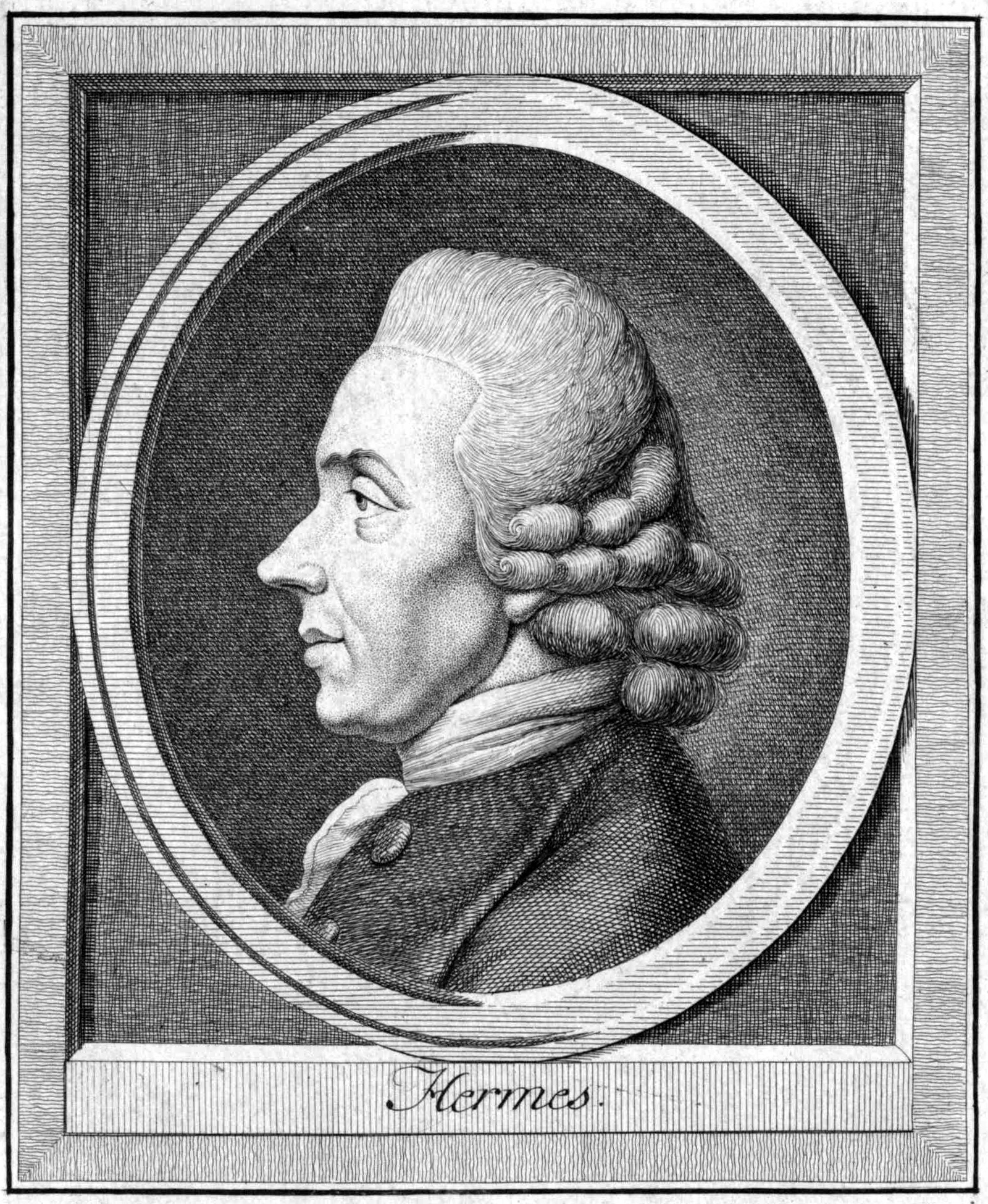
- Portrait of Johann Timotheus Hermes in Johann Caspar Lavaters Physiognomischen Fragmenten 1775
- Born: 31 May 1738; Petznick, Western Pomerania (HRE)
- Died: 24 July 1821 (aged 83); Breslau, Silesia, Prussia
- Occupations: Educator, theologian and novelist

Johann Timotheus Hermes (31 May 1738 – 24 July 1821) was a German poet, novelist and Protestant theologian.

== Life ==
=== Provenance ===
Johann Timotheus Hermes was born in Petznick, a small village near Stargard in Western Pomerania. His father was a Protestant pastor. His mother, Lukrezia, was the daughter of another Protestant pastor, Heinrich Becker from Rostock.

He had an elder brother, Hermann Daniel Hermes (1734–1807), who would attain a certain level of notability as a theologian.

=== Professional employment ===
He studied Theology at Königsberg and then became a teacher at the Ritterakademie ("Cathedral School"; literally "Knights' Academy") at Brandenburg an der Havel. There followed a succession of ecclesiastical posts, as he became a military chaplain, a court chaplain in Anhalt and then a pastor in Pleß. In 1771 Hermes became a professor of Theology at the Maria Magdalena Gymnasium (high school) in Breslau, and four years later appointed a Provost in Breslau's new town district. Subsequently, he became a pastor at the cathedral church. In 1808 he became Administrative Superintendent with responsibility for the churches and schools in the Breslau Princedom.

=== The writer ===
Published output

- Geschichte der Miss Fanny Wilkes (1766)
- Sophiens Reise von Memel nach Sachsen (1769-1773)
  - Vol 1, Leipzig 1778, 634 pages
- Für Töchter edler Herkunft (1787)
- Manch Hermäon im eigentlichen Sinn des Wortes (1788)
- Für Eltern und Ehelustige (1789)
- Zween literarische Märtyrer und deren Frauen (1789)
- Lieder für die besten bekannten Kirchenmelodien nebst 12 Kommunion-Andachten (1800)
- Anne Winterfeld (1801)
- Verheimlichung und Eil oder Lottchens und ihrer Nachbarn Geschichte (1802)
- Mutter, Amme und Kind in der Geschichte Herrn Leopold Kerkers (1809)

Hermes has become known, above all, for his novels "Geschichte der Miss Fanny Wilkes" ("The Story of Miss Fanny Wilkes" 1766) and "Sophiens Reise von Memel nach Sachsen" ("Sophie's Journey from Memel to Saxony" 1769–1773 in five volumes) which were very successful at the time, and translated into several languages. The second of these became one of the most read novel in German during the eighteenth century. The author gained the popular soubriquet "Sophien-Hermes" from it: its continuing importance two centuries later is based on its real-life descriptions concerning the cultural history of its time. The book also adumbrates aspects of the psychological novels which would flourish in the nineteenth century. "Sophie's Journey" is nevertheless characteristic of its own epoch. It is one of the most important Empathy novels: Hermes consciously imported the style of his exemplar Samuel Richardson, whose own novels had been translated into German a few years earlier.

Although Hermes wrote several more novels, he never came close to repeating the commercial success of his first two. In 1779 he published in a stand-alone volume the poems from "Sophie's Journey", presented as songs and arias, with music by Johann Adam Hiller. Other composers who set poems by Johann Timotheus Hermes to music were Maria Theresia von Paradis, Joseph Martin Kraus, Franz Anton Hoffmeister and Wolfgang Amadeus Mozart.

Despite his success or because of it, Hermes was the butt of much ridicule from the "literary greats" among his contemporaries. He was ridiculed in Xenien, a collection of Couplets published jointly by Goethe and Schiller.

In 1888 the Johann Timotheus Hermes Bibliophilenverband Vienna-Josefstadt (J.T. Hermes Bibliophilenverband) was founded.
