= Koplin =

- Village
- Location within Poland
- Coordinates: 53°9′N 15°23′E
- Country: Poland
- Voivodeship: West Pomeranian
- County: Choszczno
- Gmina: Choszczno
- Elevation: 61 m (200 ft)

Koplin [ˈkɔplin] (German: Kopplinsthal) is a village in the administrative district of Gmina Choszczno, within Choszczno County, West Pomeranian Voivodeship, in north-western Poland. It lies approximately 3 km (2 mi) south-west of Choszczno (Arnswalde) and 61 km (38 mi) south-east of the regional capital Szczecin (Stettin).

For the history of the region, see History of Pomerania.
