= Stradzewo, West Pomeranian Voivodeship =

Stradzewo
- Village
- Location within Poland
- Coordinates: 53°13′N 15°26′E
- Country: Poland
- Voivodeship: West Pomeranian
- County: Choszczno
- Gmina: Choszczno
- Elevation: 65 m (213 ft)

Stradzewo [straˈd͡zɛvɔ] (German: Stolzenfelde) is a village in the administrative district of Gmina Choszczno, within Choszczno County, West Pomeranian Voivodeship, in north-western Poland. It lies approximately 6 km (4 mi) north of Choszczno (Arnswalde) and 61 km (38 mi) east of the regional capital Szczecin (Stettin).

For the history of the region, see History of Pomerania.

== Notable residents ==
- Arnold Christopher von Waldow (1672–1734), Prussian General
