= Łaszewo, West Pomeranian Voivodeship =

Łaszewo
- Village
- Location within Poland
- Coordinates: 53°9′13″N 15°34′14″E
- Country: Poland
- Voivodeship: West Pomeranian
- County: Choszczno
- Gmina: Choszczno

Łaszewo [waˈʂɛvɔ] (German: Erdmannsthal) is a village in the administrative district of Gmina Choszczno, within Choszczno County, West Pomeranian Voivodeship, in north-western Poland. It lies approximately 12 km (7 mi) east of Choszczno and 72 km (45 mi) south-east of the regional capital Szczecin.

For the history of the region, see History of Pomerania.
