= Sławęcin, Choszczno County =

Sławęcin
- Village
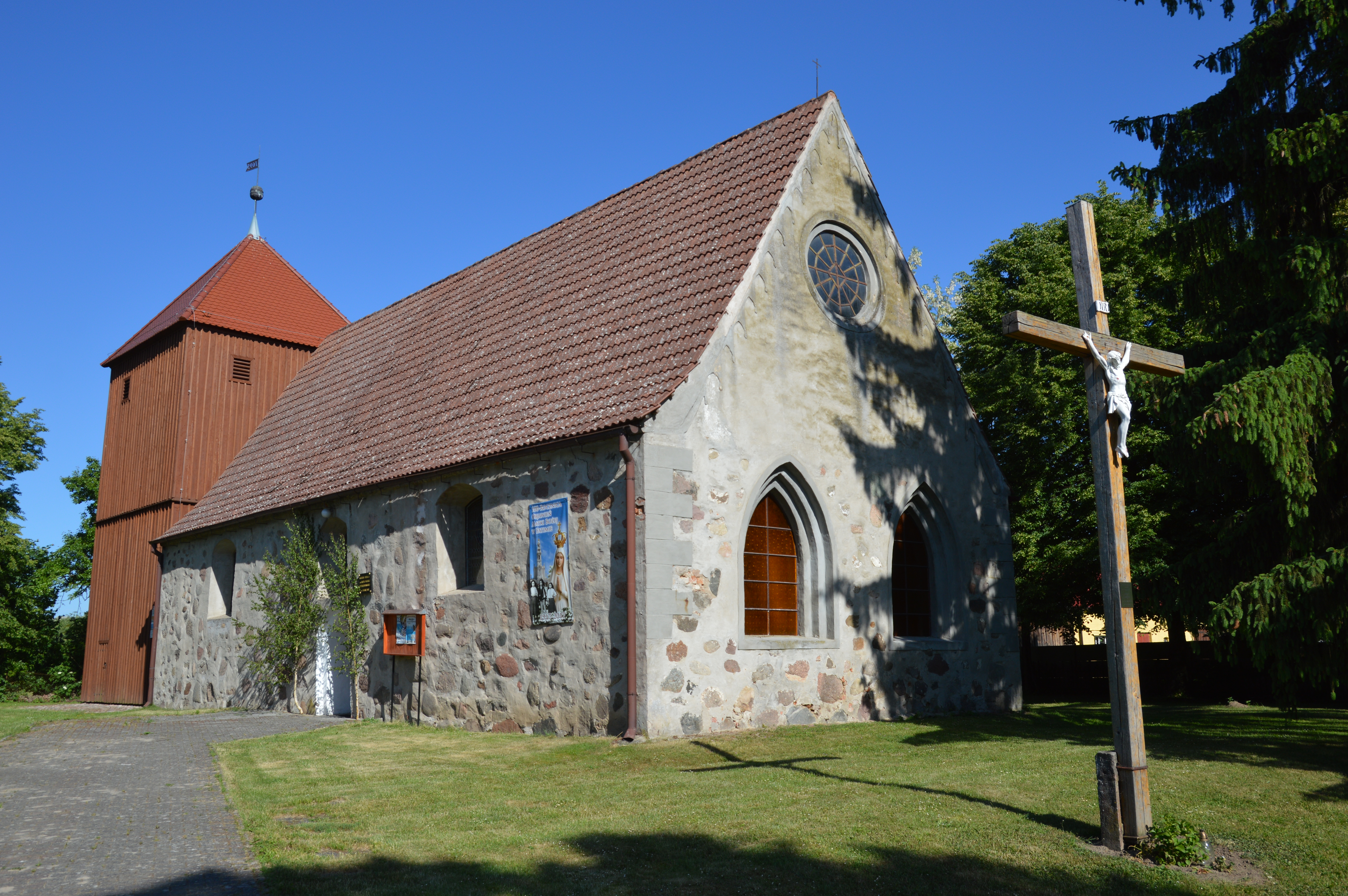
- Our Lady of the Gate of Dawn church in Sławęcin

- Location within Poland
- Coordinates: 53°13′N 15°22′E
- Country: Poland
- Voivodeship: West Pomeranian
- County: Choszczno
- Gmina: Choszczno
- Elevation: 44 m (144 ft)
- Time zone: UTC+1 (CET)
  - Summer (DST): UTC+2 (CEST)
- Vehicle registration: ZCH

Sławęcin [swaˈvɛnt͡ɕin] (German: Schlagenthin) is a village in the administrative district of Gmina Choszczno, within Choszczno County, West Pomeranian Voivodeship, in north-western Poland. It lies approximately 6 km (4 mi) north of Choszczno and 57 km (35 mi) south-east of the regional capital Szczecin.

== History ==
A Lechitic stronghold was built in the 9th century, and in the 10th century the area became part of the emerging Polish state under its first ruler Mieszko I. Following the 12th-century fragmentation of Piast-ruled Poland, it formed part of the Duchy of Greater Poland. In 1419, the village was devastated during a war between Poland and the Teutonic Order. From the 18th century the village was part of the Kingdom of Prussia, from 1815 to 1945 it belonged to the administrative district of Landkreis Arnswalde of the Province of Pomerania, and from 1871 to 1945 it was also part of Germany. In documents of the 14th century, the village is referred to as Schlawentin. From 1365 to 1752, i.e. for four hundred years, the village had been a fief of the noble family von Blankensee. Thereafter, it was owned by the families von Jagow and von Göllnitz, until, in 1829, it was bought by Wilhelm Ferdinand Eben, who passed it on to his son Carl. Thereafter, the estate had also other owners. The last owner before 1945 had been Gertrud Otto.

After the defeat of Nazi Germany in World War II in 1945, the village became again part of Poland.

== Population ==
- 1823: 308
- 1925: 538
- 2007: 247
