= Bonin, Choszczno County =

Bonin
- Village
- Location within Poland
- Coordinates: 53°11′44″N 15°21′16″E
- Country: Poland
- Voivodeship: West Pomeranian
- County: Choszczno
- Gmina: Choszczno

Bonin [ˈbɔnin] is a village in the administrative district of Gmina Choszczno, within Choszczno County, West Pomeranian Voivodeship, in north-western Poland. It lies approximately 5 km (3 mi) north-west of Choszczno and 57 km (35 mi) south-east of the regional capital Szczecin.

For the history of the region, see History of Pomerania.
