= Chełpa =

- Village
- Location within Poland
- Coordinates: 53°11′29″N 15°30′24″E
- Country: Poland
- Voivodeship: West Pomeranian
- County: Choszczno
- Gmina: Choszczno

Chełpa [ˈxɛu̯pa] (German: Helpe) is a village in the administrative district of Gmina Choszczno, within Choszczno County, West Pomeranian Voivodeship, in north-western Poland. It lies approximately 8 km (5 mi) east of Choszczno and 67 km (42 mi) east of the regional capital Szczecin.

For the history of the region, see History of Pomerania.
