= Sulechówek =

- Village
- Location within Poland
- Coordinates: 53°8′55″N 15°26′26″E
- Country: Poland
- Voivodeship: West Pomeranian
- County: Choszczno
- Gmina: Choszczno

Sulechówek [sulɛˈxuvɛk] (German: Zülichswerder) is a village in the administrative district of Gmina Choszczno, within Choszczno County, West Pomeranian Voivodeship, in north-western Poland. It lies approximately 4 km (2 mi) south-east of Choszczno and 65 km (40 mi) south-east of the regional capital Szczecin.

For the history of the region, see History of Pomerania.
