= Wysokie, West Pomeranian Voivodeship =

Wysokie
- Village
- Location within Poland
- Coordinates: 53°8′13″N 15°23′52″E
- Country: Poland
- Voivodeship: West Pomeranian
- County: Choszczno
- Gmina: Choszczno

Wysokie [vɨˈsɔkʲɛ] is a village in the administrative district of Gmina Choszczno, within Choszczno County, West Pomeranian Voivodeship, in north-western Poland. It lies approximately 4 km (2 mi) south of Choszczno and 63 km (39 mi) south-east of the regional capital Szczecin.

For the history of the region, see History of Pomerania.
