= Skrzypiec, West Pomeranian Voivodeship =

Skrzypiec
- Village
- Location within Poland
- Coordinates: 53°09′40″N 15°28′00″E
- Country: Poland
- Voivodeship: West Pomeranian
- County: Choszczno
- Gmina: Choszczno

Skrzypiec [ˈskʂɨpjɛt͡s] is a village in the administrative district of Gmina Choszczno, within Choszczno County, West Pomeranian Voivodeship, in north-western Poland.

For the history of the region, see History of Pomerania.
