= Stawin =

- Village
- Location within Poland
- Coordinates: 53°9′47″N 15°22′17″E
- Country: Poland
- Voivodeship: West Pomeranian
- County: Choszczno
- Gmina: Choszczno

Stawin [ˈstavin] is a village in the administrative district of Gmina Choszczno, within Choszczno County, West Pomeranian Voivodeship, in north-western Poland. It lies approximately 2 km (1 mi) west of Choszczno and 60 km (37 mi) south-east of the regional capital Szczecin.

For the history of the region, see History of Pomerania.
