= Witoszyn, West Pomeranian Voivodeship =

Witoszyn
- Village
- Location within Poland
- Coordinates: 53°12′N 15°27′E
- Country: Poland
- Voivodeship: West Pomeranian
- County: Choszczno
- Gmina: Choszczno
- Elevation: 60 m (200 ft)

Witoszyn [viˈtɔʂɨn] (German: Neu Schulzendorf) is a village in the administrative district of Gmina Choszczno, within Choszczno County, West Pomeranian Voivodeship, in north-western Poland. It lies approximately 5 km (3 mi) north-east of Choszczno and 63 km (39 mi) south-east of the regional capital Szczecin.

For the history of the region, see History of Pomerania.
