= Sułowo, West Pomeranian Voivodeship =

Sułowo
- Village
- Location within Poland
- Coordinates: 53°11′N 15°25′E
- Country: Poland
- Voivodeship: West Pomeranian
- County: Choszczno
- Gmina: Choszczno

Sułowo [suˈwɔvɔ] (German: Friedrichsruh) is a village in the administrative district of Gmina Choszczno, within Choszczno County, West Pomeranian Voivodeship, in north-western Poland. It lies approximately 3 km (2 mi) north-east of Choszczno and 62 km (39 mi) south-east of the regional capital Szczecin.

For the history of the region, see History of Pomerania.
