= Gleźno =

- Village
- Location within Poland
- Coordinates: 53°8′N 15°20′E
- Country: Poland
- Voivodeship: West Pomeranian
- County: Choszczno
- Gmina: Choszczno
- Elevation: 55 m (180 ft)

Gleźno [ˈɡlɛʑnɔ] (German: Hohenwalde) is a village in the administrative district of Gmina Choszczno, within Choszczno County, West Pomeranian Voivodeship, in north-western Poland. It lies approximately 6 km (4 mi) south-west of Choszczno (Arnswalde) and 59 km (37 mi) south-east of the regional capital Szczecin (Stettin).

For the history of the region, see History of Pomerania.
