= Zwierzyn, West Pomeranian Voivodeship =

Zwierzyn
- Village
- Location within Poland
- Coordinates: 53°6′N 15°24′E
- Country: Poland
- Voivodeship: West Pomeranian
- County: Choszczno
- Gmina: Choszczno
- Elevation: 50 m (160 ft)

Zwierzyn ([ˈzvjɛʐɨn]; German: Schwerinsfeld) is a village in the administrative district of Gmina Choszczno, within Choszczno County, West Pomeranian Voivodeship, in north-western Poland. It lies approximately 8 km (5 mi) south of Choszczno and 65 km (40 mi) south-east of the regional capital Szczecin.

For the history of the region, see History of Pomerania.
