= Gostyczyn =

- Village
- Location within Poland
- Coordinates: 53°8′57″N 15°25′16″E
- Country: Poland
- Voivodeship: West Pomeranian
- County: Choszczno
- Gmina: Choszczno
- Time zone: UTC+1 (CET)
  - Summer (DST): UTC+2 (CEST)
- Vehicle registration: ZCH

Gostyczyn [ɡɔsˈtɨt͡ʂɨn] (German: Gastingen) is a village in the administrative district of Gmina Choszczno, within Choszczno County, West Pomeranian Voivodeship, in north-western Poland. It lies approximately 3 km (2 mi) south-east of Choszczno and 64 km (40 mi) south-east of the regional capital Szczecin.
