= Raduń, Choszczno County =

Raduń
- Village
- Location within Poland
- Coordinates: 53°8′27″N 15°30′16″E
- Country: Poland
- Voivodeship: West Pomeranian
- County: Choszczno
- Gmina: Choszczno

Raduń [ˈraduɲ] (German: Radun) is a village in the administrative district of Gmina Choszczno, within Choszczno County, West Pomeranian Voivodeship, in north-western Poland. It lies approximately 8 km (5 mi) east of Choszczno (Arnswalde) and 69 km (43 mi) south-east of the regional capital Szczecin (Stettin).

For the history of the region, see History of Pomerania.
