= Brzostno =

- Village
- Location within Poland
- Coordinates: 53°10′34″N 15°37′19″E
- Country: Poland
- Voivodeship: West Pomeranian
- County: Choszczno
- Gmina: Choszczno

Brzostno [ˈbʐɔstnɔ] is a village in the administrative district of Gmina Choszczno, within Choszczno County, West Pomeranian Voivodeship, in north-western Poland. It lies approximately 15 km (9 mi) east of Choszczno and 75 km (47 mi) east of the regional capital Szczecin.

For the history of the region, see History of Pomerania.
