= Golcza =

- Village
- Location within Poland
- Coordinates: 53°8′9″N 15°36′6″E
- Country: Poland
- Voivodeship: West Pomeranian
- County: Choszczno
- Gmina: Choszczno

Golcza [ˈɡɔlt͡ʂa] (German: Golzenruh) is a village in the administrative district of Gmina Choszczno, within Choszczno County, West Pomeranian Voivodeship, in north-western Poland. It lies approximately 14 km (9 mi) east of Choszczno and 75 km (47 mi) south-east of the regional capital Szczecin.

For the history of the region, see History of Pomerania.
