= Kleszczewo, Choszczno County =

Kleszczewo
- Village
- Location within Poland
- Coordinates: 53°7′56″N 15°27′21″E
- Country: Poland
- Voivodeship: West Pomeranian
- County: Choszczno
- Gmina: Choszczno

Kleszczewo [klɛʂˈt͡ʂɛvɔ] is a village in the administrative district of Gmina Choszczno, within Choszczno County, West Pomeranian Voivodeship, in north-western Poland. It lies approximately 6 km (4 mi) south-east of Choszczno and 67 km (42 mi) south-east of the regional capital Szczecin.

For the history of the region, see History of Pomerania.
