= Nowe Żeńsko =

- Village
- Location within Poland
- Coordinates: 53°7′45″N 15°24′30″E
- Country: Poland
- Voivodeship: West Pomeranian
- County: Choszczno
- Gmina: Choszczno
- Population: 68

Nowe Żeńsko [ˈnɔvɛ ˈʐɛɲskɔ] (German: Neu-Schönfeld) is a village in the administrative district of Gmina Choszczno, within Choszczno County, West Pomeranian Voivodeship, in north-western Poland. It lies approximately 5 km (3 mi) south of Choszczno and 64 km (40 mi) south-east of the regional capital Szczecin.

For the history of the region, see History of Pomerania.

The village has a population of 68.
