= Płoki, West Pomeranian Voivodeship =

Płoki
- Village
- Location within Poland
- Coordinates: 53°8′43″N 15°23′58″E
- Country: Poland
- Voivodeship: West Pomeranian
- County: Choszczno
- Gmina: Choszczno

Płoki [ˈpwɔki] (German: Wilhelmsburg) is a village in the administrative district of Gmina Choszczno, within Choszczno County, West Pomeranian Voivodeship, in north-western Poland. It lies approximately 3 km (2 mi) south of Choszczno and 63 km (39 mi) south-east of the regional capital Szczecin.

For the history of the region, see History of Pomerania.
