= Wardynka =

River in Poland

Coordinates: 53°11′22″N 15°29′22″E

Location
- Country: Poland

Physical characteristics
- Mouth
  - location: Stobnica

Basin features
- Progression: Stobnica→ Ina→ Oder→ Baltic Sea

The Wardynka is a river in Poland. It is a tributary of the Stobnica, which it joins near Wardyń.
