= Rudnisko =

- Settlement
- Location within Poland
- Coordinates: 53°13′02″N 15°28′06″E
- Country: Poland
- Voivodeship: West Pomeranian
- County: Choszczno
- Gmina: Choszczno
- Time zone: UTC+01:00 (CET)
  - Summer (DST): UTC+02:00 (CEST)

Rudnisko [rudˈniskɔ] is a settlement in the administrative district of Gmina Choszczno, within Choszczno County, West Pomeranian Voivodeship, in north-western Poland.

For the history of the region, see History of Pomerania.
