= Arnold Christopher von Waldow =

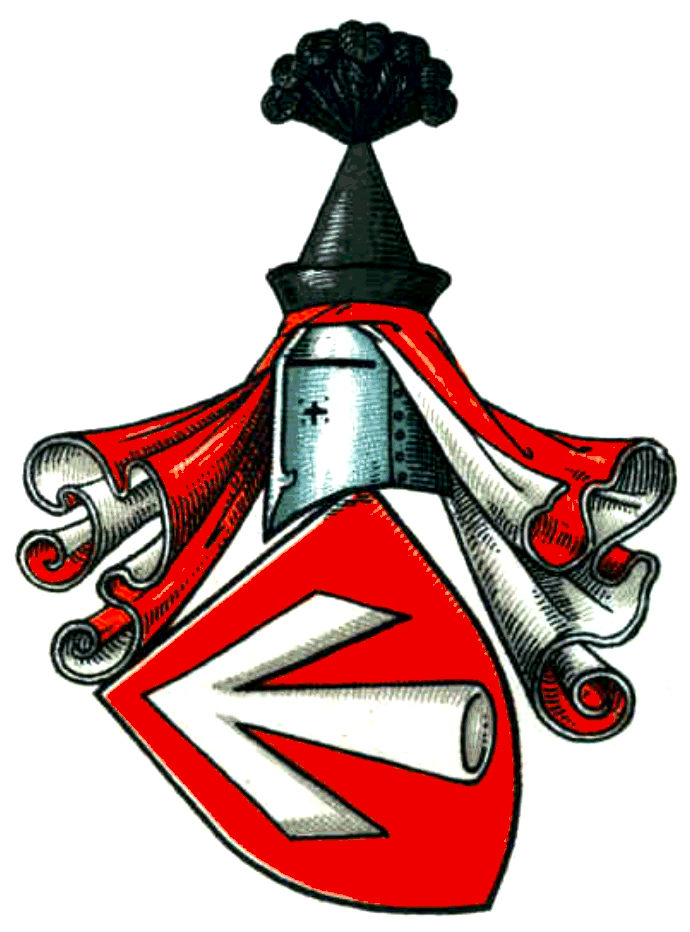
Waldow coat of arms

Arnold Christoph von Waldow (1672–1743) was Lord of the Manor on Hammer and Költschen, Lieutenant General, Governor of Breslau and Knight of the Black Eagle. Born on 15 April 1672 in Stolzenfelde, Neumark, he was the son of the Brandenburg Captain Christian Sigismund von Waldow (1650–1707) and Katharina von Sydow (1651–1702). His brother Friedrich Siegmund von Waldow (1682–1743) was a Prussian general.

== Life ==
He first studied 1690 in Frankfurt an der Oder and then went in 1694 into the Prussian Army in the Cuirassiers and was promoted to lieutenant on 5 December 1702. Severely wounded at Höchstädt he had to resign. He then moved in 1704 to join Mecklenburg forces. In 1709 he fought in the Battle of Malplaquet and in 1715 he was involved in the siege of Stralsund, as well as the landing on Rügen.

By 1719 he was a colonel in a cavalry regiment in the battle of Walsmühlen where he was slightly injured. Between 1723 he went to 1728 to his estates, but then again served in the Prussian Army as head of the cuirassiers No. 12 (Winterfeld). On 26 July 1731 he became Major General and Drost (bailiff) of Orsoy. He enjoyed the special confidence of King William I, whom he accompanied in 1738 on the royal trip to Holland. In 1740, he was lieutenant general and on 19 July 1741 was made Knight of the Black Eagle.

On 17 May 1742 he commanded the left wing in the Battle of Chotusitz, where he received a severe injury to the head. He died at Breslau, where he was governor, as a result of the injuries obtained at Chotusitz. He was buried there in the Church of the Eleven Thousand Virgins.

== Family ==
He was married to Elisabeth of Parsenow (died 31 August 1744). His son Karl Ludwig (1721–1754 in Meichen) was married to Henriette Albertine of Trenck (1728–1760), the sister of the famous Friedrich von der Trenck. His daughter Katharina Charlotte (1710 – 21 February 1769) married in 1738 Ludwig Ewald von Rohr (1711?).

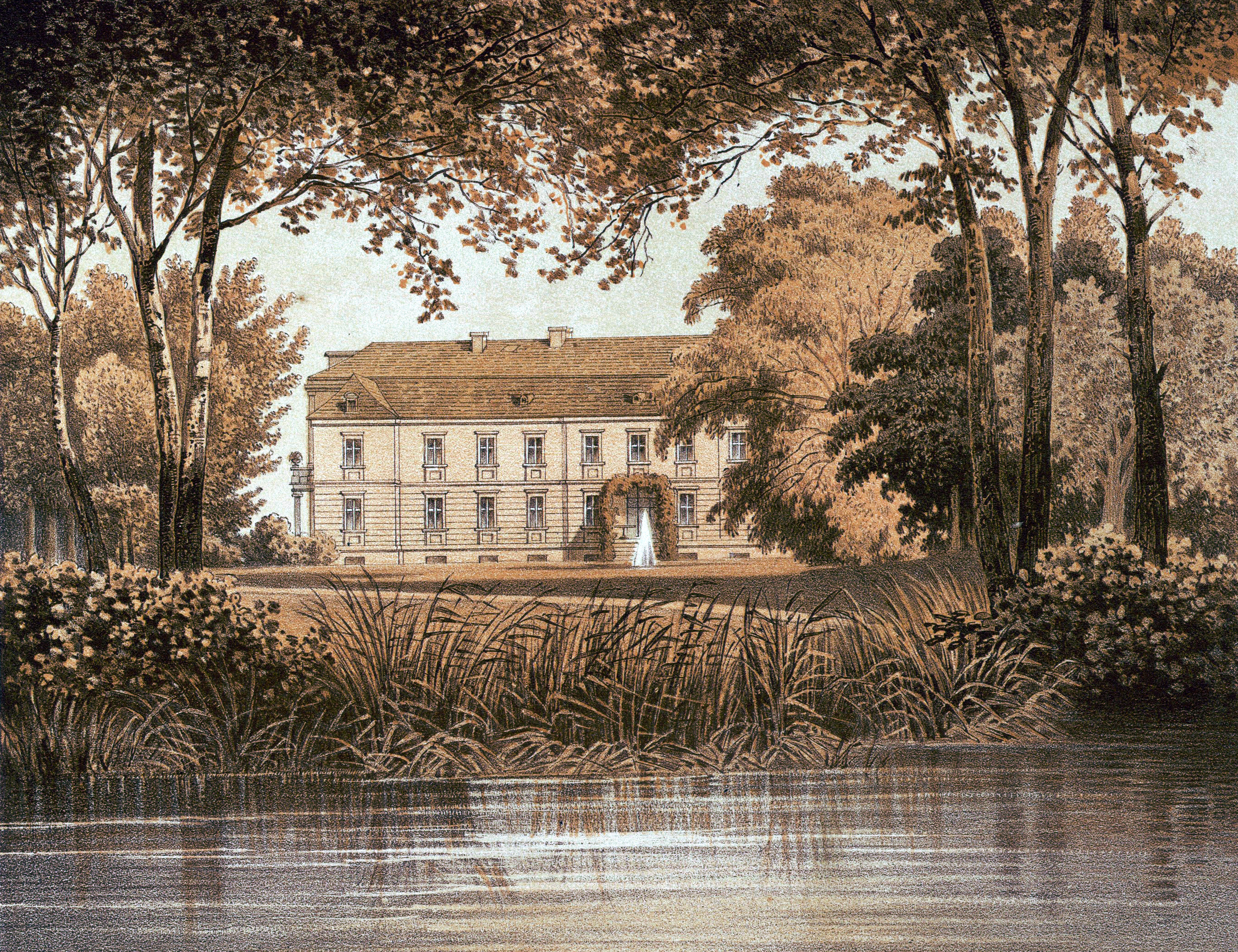
Schloss Königswalde, Neumark, in 1860, by Alexander Duncker

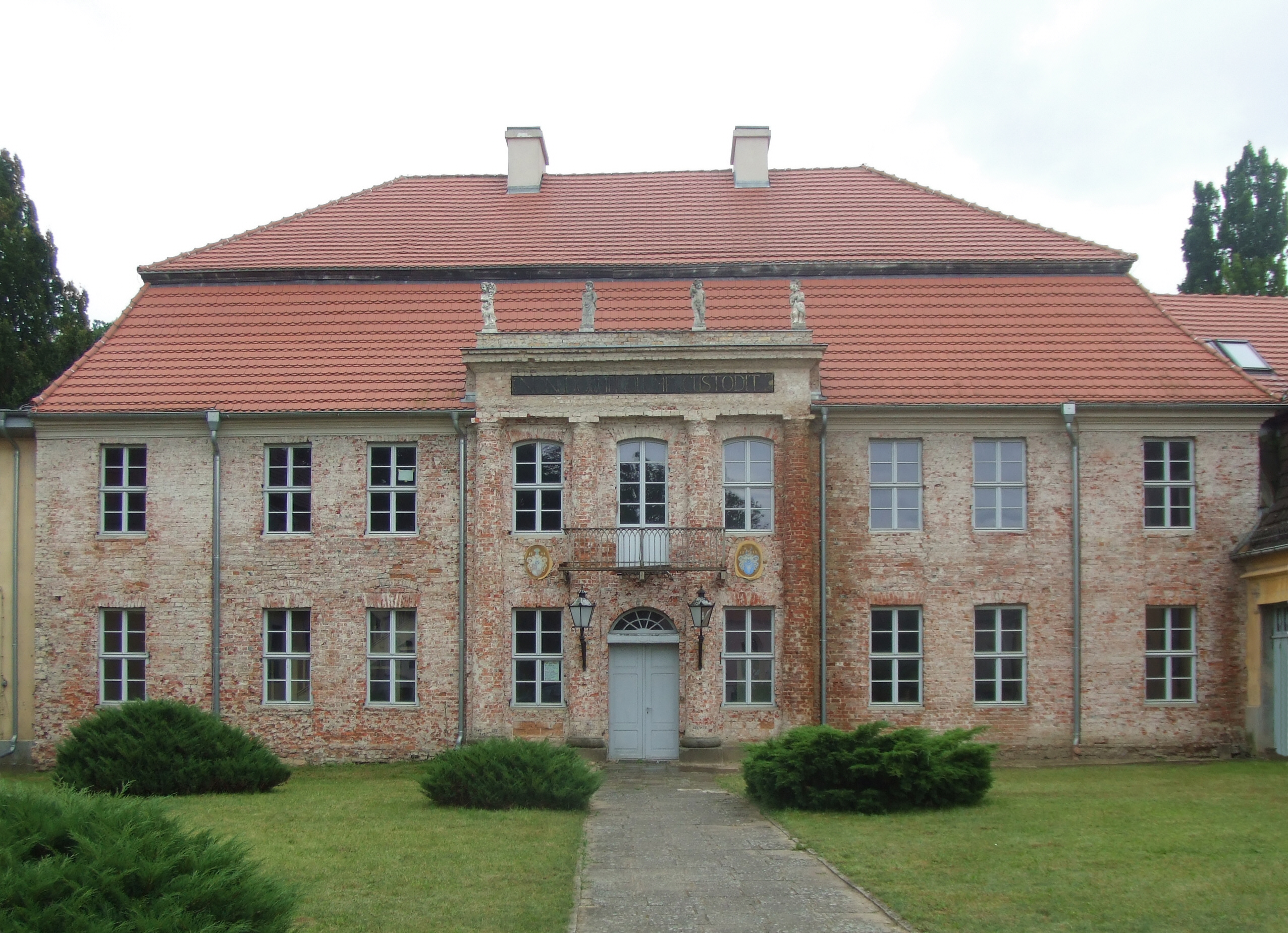
Dannenwalde Manor

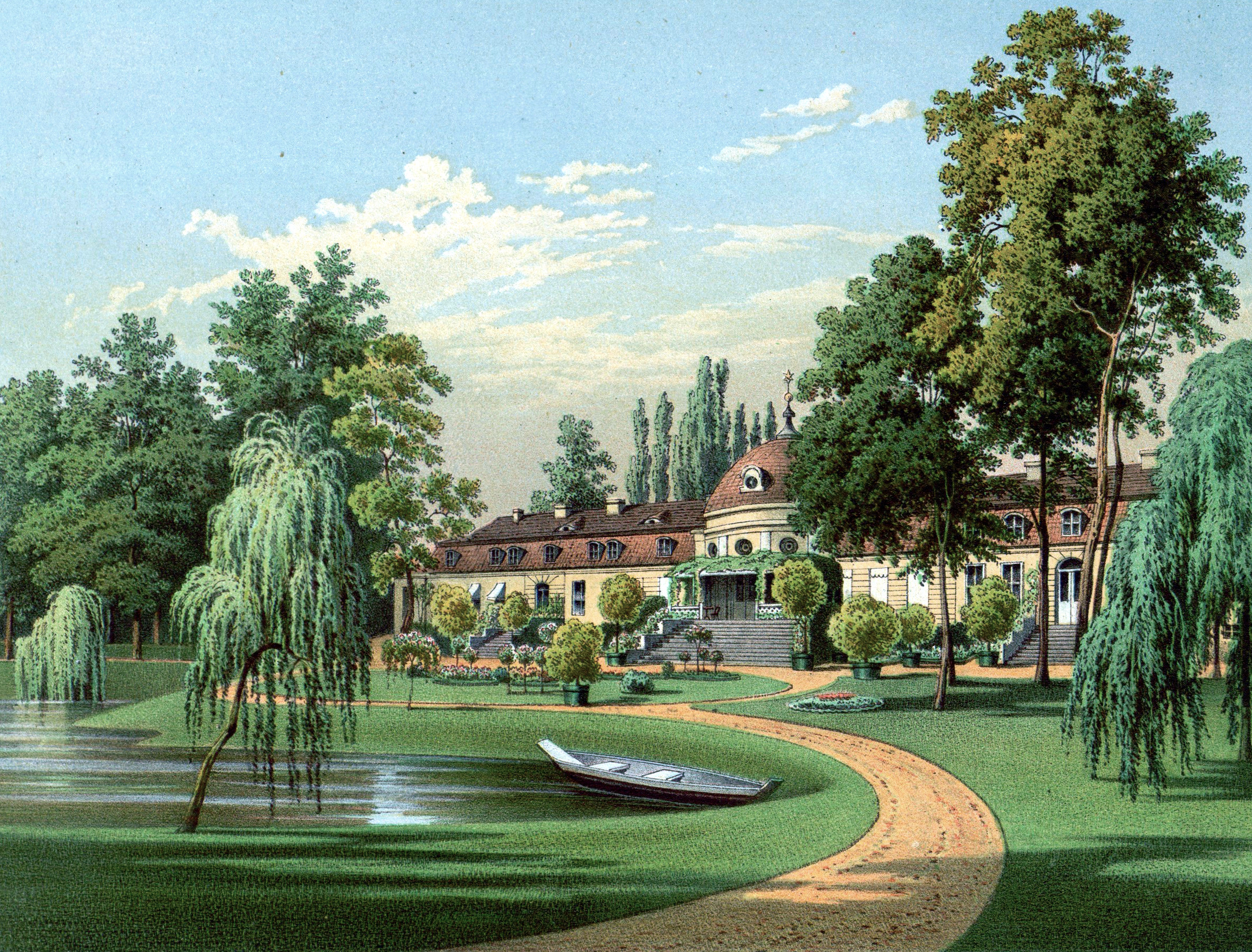
Schloss Gleissen in 1860, by Alexander Duncker.

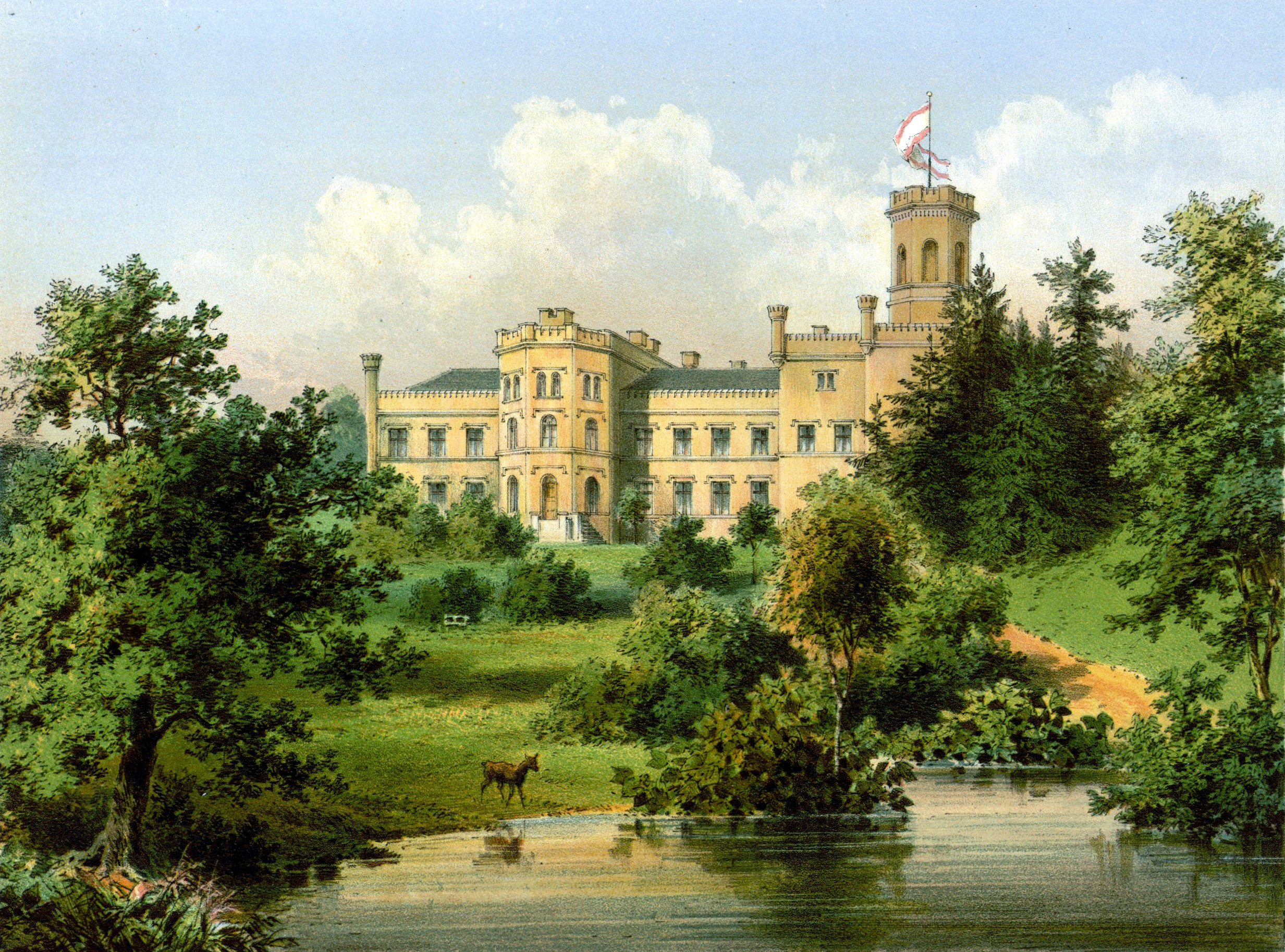
House at Merenthin im 1860, by Alexander Duncker.
