= Szczepanka =

- Village
- Location within Poland
- Coordinates: 53°9′15″N 15°25′8″E
- Country: Poland
- Voivodeship: West Pomeranian
- County: Choszczno
- Gmina: Choszczno
- Elevation: 55 m (180 ft)
- Post Code: 73-200
- Area Code: (+48) 95
- Vehicle registration: ZCH

Szczepanka [ʂt͡ʂɛˈpanka] (German: Karlsburg) is a village in the administrative district of Gmina Choszczno, within Choszczno County, West Pomeranian Voivodeship, in north-western Poland. It lies approximately 2 km (1 mi) south-east of Choszczno and 63 km (39 mi) south-east of the regional capital Szczecin.

For the history of the region, see History of Pomerania.
