= Krzysztof Ciebień =

Polish diplomat

Poland Ambassador to North Korea
- In office 13 September 2014 – 31 January 2019
- Preceded by: Edward Pietrzyk

Personal details
- Born: 1 July 1955 (age 71) Lublin, Poland
- Education: Moscow State Institute of International Relations
- Profession: Diplomat

Krzysztof Artur Ciebień (born 1 July 1955 in Lublin, Poland) is a Polish diplomat, ambassador to North Korea (2014–2019).

== Life ==
Ciebień grew up in Zamość, where he finished high school. He started his studies at the Main School of Planning and Statistics in Warsaw and continued them at the Moscow State Institute of International Relations. Finally, in 1981 he graduated from the Faculty of Far East. He hasalso studied at the Polish Institute of International Affairs (1985), National School of Public Administration (2007), and Polish Institute of Diplomacy (2014). Besides Polish, he speaks Chinese, English, and Russian.

In October 1981, he began his professional career at the Ministry of Foreign Affairs of Poland (MFA). Following year, he was sent to China, serving at the Consulate General in Shanghai and at the Embassy in Beijing. In 1984, he returned to the MFA, Department of Africa, Asia, Australia and Oceania. Between 1986 and 1990, he was back at the Embassy in Beijing. From 1992 to 1997, he was Consul General in Hong Kong. For the next three years, he was responsible for the relations with Asian states at the MFA. Next, he was deputy ambassador in Bangkok, Thailand (2000–2004) and Beijing (2005–2006). From 2006 to 2009, he was head of East Asia Unit at the MFA Asia-Pacific Department. Between 2009 and 2014, he was holding posts of the Consul General in Guangzhou and, from 13 September 2014 to 31 January 2019, Poland Ambassador to North Korea.
