= Krzowiec =

- Village
- Location within Poland
- Coordinates: 53°9′34″N 15°36′32″E
- Country: Poland
- Voivodeship: West Pomeranian
- County: Choszczno
- Gmina: Choszczno

Krzowiec [ˈkʂɔvjɛt͡s] is a village in the administrative district of Gmina Choszczno, within Choszczno County, West Pomeranian Voivodeship, in north-western Poland. It lies approximately 14 km (9 mi) east of Choszczno and 74 km (46 mi) south-east of the regional capital Szczecin.

For the history of the region, see History of Pomerania.
