= Roztocze, West Pomeranian Voivodeship =

Roztocze
- Village
- Location within Poland
- Coordinates: 53°10′59″N 15°26′51″E
- Country: Poland
- Voivodeship: West Pomeranian
- County: Choszczno
- Gmina: Choszczno

Roztocze [rɔsˈtɔt͡ʂɛ] is a village in the administrative district of Gmina Choszczno, within Choszczno County, West Pomeranian Voivodeship, in north-western Poland. It lies approximately 4 km (2 mi) north-east of Choszczno and 64 km (40 mi) south-east of the regional capital Szczecin.

For the history of the region, see History of Pomerania.
