= Pakość, West Pomeranian Voivodeship =

Pakość
- Village
- Location within Poland
- Coordinates: 53°11′N 15°23′E
- Country: Poland
- Voivodeship: West Pomeranian
- County: Choszczno
- Gmina: Choszczno
- Time zone: UTC+1 (CET)
  - Summer (DST): UTC+2 (CEST)

Pakość [ˈpakɔɕt͡ɕ] is a village located in the administrative district of Gmina Choszczno, within Choszczno County, West Pomeranian Voivodeship, in north-western Poland. It lies approximately 3 km (2 mi) north-west of Choszczno and 60 km (37 mi) south-east of the regional capital Szczecin. It is located within the historic region of Pomerania.
