= Suliszewo, Choszczno County =

Suliszewo
- Village
- Location within Poland
- Coordinates: 53°11′0″N 15°35′0″E
- Country: Poland
- Voivodeship: West Pomeranian
- County: Choszczno
- Gmina: Choszczno

Suliszewo [suliˈʂɛvɔ] (German: Zühlsdorf) is a village in the administrative district of Gmina Choszczno, within Choszczno County, West Pomeranian Voivodeship, in north-western Poland. It lies approximately 13 km (8 mi) east of Choszczno (Arnswalde) and 72 km (45 mi) east of the regional capital Szczecin (Stettin).

For the history of the region, see History of Pomerania.
