= Czernice, Choszczno County =

Czernice
- Village
- Location within Poland
- Coordinates: 53°12′12″N 15°24′45″E
- Country: Poland
- Voivodeship: West Pomeranian
- County: Choszczno
- Gmina: Choszczno

Czernice [t͡ʂɛrˈnit͡sɛ] (German: Stadtziegelei) is a village in the administrative district of Gmina Choszczno, within Choszczno County, West Pomeranian Voivodeship, in north-western Poland. It lies approximately 5 km (3 mi) north of Choszczno and 61 km (38 mi) south-east of the regional capital Szczecin.

== See also ==
- History of Pomerania
