= Rzeczki, West Pomeranian Voivodeship =

Rzeczki
- Village
- Location within Poland
- Coordinates: 53°11′3″N 15°32′54″E
- Country: Poland
- Voivodeship: West Pomeranian
- County: Choszczno
- Gmina: Choszczno

Rzeczki [ˈʐɛt͡ʂki] (German: Domäne Rietzig) is a village in the administrative district of Gmina Choszczno, within Choszczno County, West Pomeranian Voivodeship, in north-western Poland. It lies approximately 11 km (7 mi) east of Choszczno and 70 km (43 mi) east of the regional capital Szczecin.

For the history of the region, see History of Pomerania.
