= Baczyn, West Pomeranian Voivodeship =

Baczyn
- Village
- Location within Poland
- Coordinates: 53°9′N 15°27′E
- Country: Poland
- Voivodeship: West Pomeranian
- County: Choszczno
- Gmina: Choszczno
- Elevation: 53 m (174 ft)

Baczyn [ˈbat͡ʂɨn] is a village in the administrative district of Gmina Choszczno, within Choszczno County, West Pomeranian Voivodeship, in north-western Poland. It lies approximately 4 km (2 mi) south-east of Choszczno and 65 km (40 mi) south-east of the regional capital Szczecin.

For the history of the region, see History of Pomerania.
