= Korytowo, Choszczno County =

Korytowo
- Village
- Location within Poland
- Coordinates: 53°8′43″N 15°32′53″E
- Country: Poland
- Voivodeship: West Pomeranian
- County: Choszczno
- Gmina: Choszczno
- Website: http://www.korytowo.zp.pl/

Korytowo [kɔrɨˈtɔvɔ] (German: Kürtow) is a village in the administrative district of Gmina Choszczno, within Choszczno County, West Pomeranian Voivodeship, in north-western Poland. It lies approximately 11 km (7 mi) east of Choszczno (Arnswalde) and 71 km (44 mi) south-east of the regional capital Szczecin (Stettin).

For the history of the region, see History of Pomerania.
