= Edward Pietrzyk =

Polish general (1949–2021)

General Edward Pietrzyk
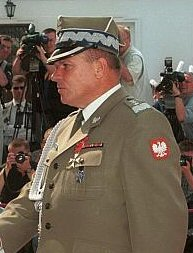
- Gen. Pietrzyk receiving general's rank
- Born: 3 November 1949; Rawa Mazowiecka, Poland
- Died: 5 May 2021 (aged 71)
- Service years: 1971–2006
- Rank: Generał broni
- Units: 2nd Artillery Brigade, Polish artillery and rocket forces
- Awards: Order of Polonia Restituta; Gold Cross of Merit; Legion of Merit (USA)
- Other work: Polish ambassador to Iraq; Polish ambassador to DPRK

Generał broni Edward Pietrzyk (3 November 1949 – 5 May 2021) was a Polish military officer, diplomat and general in the Polish Army. He was commander-in-chief of the Polish Land Forces.

== Early life and career ==
Pietrzyk was born in Rawa Mazowiecka in 1949. In 1971 he graduated from the Military University of Technology (WAT) of Warsaw, after which he served for six years in the 2nd Artillery Brigade. In 1978 he moved to Moscow, where he graduated from the local Military Academy of Artillery. In 1988 he became the deputy commander of Polish artillery and rocket forces of the Warsaw Military Area. In 1990, Pietrzyk graduated from the General Staff Academy of the USSR and after two years of service as the deputy chief of operations of the General Staff, he became the chief of the Operational Command of the Polish General Staff. Between 1998 and 2000 he was the deputy commander of the Multinational Corps North East composed of forces of Poland, Czech Republic, Denmark, Estonia, Germany, Latvia, Lithuania and Slovakia. Between 2000 and September 2006 he was commander of the Land Forces of Poland. In 2000 he graduated from the National War College, Washington, D.C.

Between April 2007 and January 2010, Pietrzyk served as Polish ambassador to Iraq (followed by Stanisław Smoleń). From January 2010 till 2014, Pietrzyk served as Poland's ambassador to North Korea, followed by Krzysztof Ciebień.

=== 2007 Baghdad incident ===
On 3 October 2007, Pietrzyk was wounded by a roadside bomb in a probable assassination attempt in Baghdad. He was flown to a military hospital by a Blackwater Security helicopter. Pietrzyk received burns to about 20 percent of his body, including his air passageways, and was held in an artificial coma to reduce the pain. The United Nations Security Council convened a meeting to condemn this attack.
