= Zamęcin =

- Village
- Location within Poland
- Coordinates: 53°7′N 15°22′E
- Country: Poland
- Voivodeship: West Pomeranian
- County: Choszczno
- Gmina: Choszczno

Zamęcin [zaˈmɛnt͡ɕin] (German: Sammenthin) is a village in the administrative district of Gmina Choszczno, within Choszczno County, West Pomeranian Voivodeship, in north-western Poland. It lies approximately 6 km (4 mi) south of Choszczno (Arnswalde) and 62 km (39 mi) south-east of the regional capital Szczecin (Stettin).

For the history of the region, see History of Pomerania.
