= Kołki =

- Village
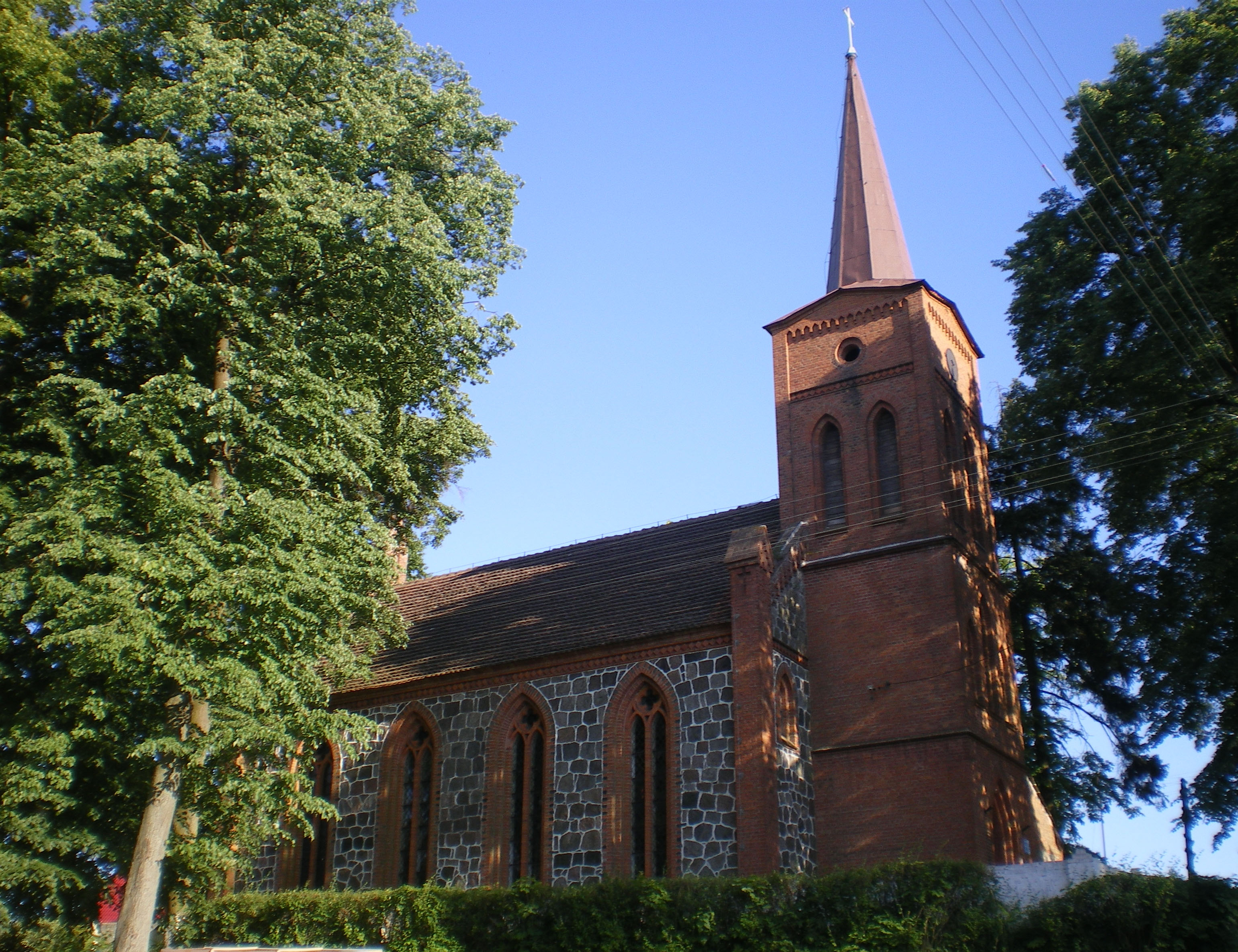
- Church of Saint Theresa

- Location within Poland
- Coordinates: 53°8′54″N 15°37′37″E
- Country: Poland
- Voivodeship: West Pomeranian
- County: Choszczno
- Gmina: Choszczno
- Elevation: 85 m (279 ft)

Population
  - Total: 420

Kołki [ˈkɔu̯ki] (formerly German: Rohrbeck) is a village in the administrative district of Gmina Choszczno, within Choszczno County, West Pomeranian Voivodeship, in north-western Poland. It lies approximately 16 km (10 mi) east of Choszczno and 76 km (47 mi) south-east of the regional capital Szczecin.

For the history of the region, see History of Pomerania.

The village has a population of 420.
