= Przywodzie, Choszczno County =

Przywodzie
- Village
- Location within Poland
- Country: Poland
- Voivodeship: West Pomeranian
- County: Choszczno
- Gmina: Choszczno
- Time zone: UTC+01:00 (CET)
  - Summer (DST): UTC+02:00 (CEST)

Przywodzie [pʂɨˈvɔd͡ʑɛ] is a village in the administrative district of Gmina Choszczno, within Choszczno County, West Pomeranian Voivodeship, in north-western Poland.

For the history of the region, see History of Pomerania.
