= Zwierzynek, Choszczno County =

Zwierzynek
- Village
- Location within Poland
- Coordinates: 53°5′42″N 15°24′13″E
- Country: Poland
- Voivodeship: West Pomeranian
- County: Choszczno
- Gmina: Choszczno

Zwierzynek [zvjɛˈʐɨnɛk] (German: Schwerin) is a village in the administrative district of Gmina Choszczno, within Choszczno County, West Pomeranian Voivodeship, in north-western Poland. It lies approximately 8 km (5 mi) south of Choszczno and 66 km (41 mi) south-east of the regional capital Szczecin.

For the history of the region, see History of Pomerania.
