= Sulino, Choszczno County =

Sulino
- Village
- Location within Poland
- Coordinates: 53°12′N 15°23′E
- Country: Poland
- Voivodeship: West Pomeranian
- County: Choszczno
- Gmina: Choszczno
- Elevation: 55 m (180 ft)

Sulino [suˈlinɔ] (German: Ebenau) is a village situated in the administrative district of Gmina Choszczno, within Choszczno County, West Pomeranian Voivodeship, in north-western Poland. It lies approximately 5 km (3 mi) north of Choszczno (Arnswalde) and 60 km (37 mi) east of the regional capital Szczecin (Stettin).

== See also ==
- History of Pomerania
