= Radaczewo, Choszczno County =

Radaczewo
- Village
- Location within Poland
- Coordinates: 53°13′N 15°20′E
- Country: Poland
- Voivodeship: West Pomeranian
- County: Choszczno
- Gmina: Choszczno

Radaczewo [radaˈt͡ʂɛvɔ] (German: Reichenbach) is a village in the administrative district of Gmina Choszczno, within Choszczno County, West Pomeranian Voivodeship, in north-western Poland. It lies approximately 8 km (5 mi) north-west of Choszczno (Arnswalde) and 55 km (34 mi) south-east of the regional capital Szczecin (Stettin).

For the history of the region, see History of Pomerania.
