= Wardyń =

- Village
- Location within Poland
- Coordinates: 53°10′N 15°30′E
- Country: Poland
- Voivodeship: West Pomeranian
- County: Choszczno
- Gmina: Choszczno

Wardyń [ˈvardɨɲ] (German: Wardin) is a village in the administrative district of Gmina Choszczno, within Choszczno County, West Pomeranian Voivodeship, in north-western Poland. It lies approximately 7 km (4 mi) east of Choszczno (Arnswalde) and 68 km (42 mi) south-east of the regional capital Szczecin (Stettin).

For the history of the region, see History of Pomerania.
