= Gmina Choszczno =

Gmina Choszczno Choszczno Commune
- Gmina
- Flag Coat of arms
- Interactive map of Gmina Choszczno
- Coordinates (Choszczno): 53°10′N 15°24′E
- Country: Poland
- Voivodeship: West Pomeranian
- County: Choszczno
- Seat: Choszczno

Area
  - Total: 246.53 km^{2} (95.19 sq mi)

Population (2006)
  - Total: 22,263
  - Density: 90.305/km^{2} (233.89/sq mi)
  - Urban: 15,753
  - Rural: 6,510
- Website: http://www.choszczno.pl/

Gmina Choszczno is an urban-rural gmina (administrative district) in Choszczno County, West Pomeranian Voivodeship, in north-western Poland. Its seat is the town of Choszczno, which lies approximately 62 kilometres (39 mi) south-east of the regional capital Szczecin.

The gmina covers an area of 246.53 square kilometres (95.2 sq mi), and as of 2006 its total population is 22,263 (out of which the population of Choszczno amounts to 15,753, and the population of the rural part of the gmina is 6,510).

== Villages ==
Apart from the town of Choszczno, Gmina Choszczno contains the villages and settlements of Baczyn, Bonin, Brzostno, Chełpa, Czernice, Czyżewka, Gleźno, Golcza, Gostyczyn, Kleszczewo, Kołki, Koplin, Korytowo, Krzowiec, Łaszewo, Nowe Żeńsko, Oraczewice, Pakość, Piasecznik, Płoki, Przywodzie, Radaczewo, Radlice, Raduń, Roztocze, Rudniki, Rudnisko, Rzecko, Rzeczki, Skrzypiec, Sławęcin, Smoleń, Stary Klukom, Stawin, Stradzewo, Sulechówek, Sulino, Suliszewo, Sułowo, Szczepanka, Wardyń, Witoszyn, Wysokie, Zamęcin, Zwierzyn and Zwierzynek.

== Neighbouring gminas ==
Gmina Choszczno is bordered by the gminas of Bierzwnik, Dolice, Drawno, Krzęcin, Pełczyce, Recz and Suchań.
