= Radlice, Choszczno County =

Radlice
- Village
- Location within Poland
- Coordinates: 53°11′N 15°28′E
- Country: Poland
- Voivodeship: West Pomeranian
- County: Choszczno
- Gmina: Choszczno

Radlice ([raˈdlit͡sɛ]; German: Schulzendorf) is a village in the administrative district of Gmina Choszczno, within Choszczno County, West Pomeranian Voivodeship, in north-western Poland. It lies approximately 5 km (3 mi) north-east of Choszczno and 65 km (40 mi) south-east of the regional capital Szczecin.

For the history of the region, see History of Pomerania.
