= Smoleń, West Pomeranian Voivodeship =

Smoleń
- Village
- Location within Poland
- Coordinates: 53°15′N 15°46′E
- Country: Poland
- Voivodeship: West Pomeranian
- County: Choszczno
- Gmina: Choszczno

Smoleń [ˈsmɔlɛɲ] (German: Karlsburg) is a village in the administrative district of Gmina Choszczno, within Choszczno County, West Pomeranian Voivodeship, in north-western Poland. It lies approximately 27 km (17 mi) east of Choszczno (Arnswalde) and 81 km (50 mi) east of the regional capital Szczecin (Stettin).

For the history of the region, see History of Pomerania.
