= Henryk Waniek =

Polish artist, stage-set designer, author-journalist and commentator

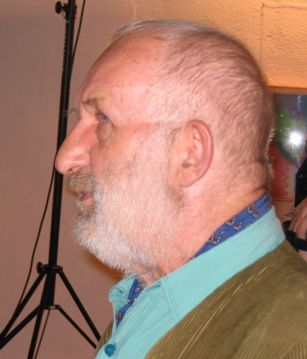
- Henryk Waniek in 2004
- Born: 4 March 1942 (age 84); Oświęcim/Auschwitz, Upper Silesia, Germany
- Education: Kraków Academy of Fine Arts; University of Kraków
- Occupations: artist stage-set designer author-journalist critic-commentator (arts and literature)
- Spouse: Joanna Pasiud

Henryk Waniek (born 4 March 1942) is a Polish artist, stage-set designer, author-journalist and commentator on literature and the arts.

== Life ==
Henryk Waniek was born in Oświęcim, a small town near Kraków. The family moved to nearby Katowice in January 1945, and it was there that he later attended school, passing his school final exams ("Matura") in 1962 and then taking a year out to work in a Katowice book shop. In 1964 he enrolled at the Kraków Academy of Fine Arts. During 1965/66 he studied at the University of Kraków. During this period he was also one of those involved in the (politically unreliable, in the eyes of some) Dyskusyjny klub filmowy "Kino-oko" (film club) in Katowice, becoming club president in 1966.

As a student he came under the influence of Barbarą and Henryk Ziembicki, known for a fantastical-magical artistic approach. The adjective "magical" is one he continues to apply to his artistic style. He also joined the Oneiron Group, founded in 1967, and sometimes known as the "Spiritual Insights League". Other members included Antoni Halor and Andrzej Urbanowicz. Members of the group turned to magic and alchemy as well as the philosophy and religions of the Far East, attempting to access and use for artistic purposes differing levels of consciousness. During the 1960s and 1970s they held regular sessions, made films and distributed "New Unpretentious Holy Scripture in Pictures" ("Nowe Bezpretensjonalne Pismo Święte w Obrazkach") a periodical, published using a duplicating machine and distributed to homes and artists' studios. It took the form of a document wallet containing manuscripts, typescripts, drawings, photographs and recordings.

In 1970 he obtained a diploma in poster art and graphic art techniques, studying with professors Tadeusza Grabowskiego and Andrzej Pietsch. After graduating he worked briefly at the "State Lyceum of Fine Arts" ("Państwowym Liceum Sztuk Plastycznych") in Katowice as an art teacher, and as a lecturer at the Art Department of the University of Silesia in Katowice. In 1976 he received an Italian government scholarship for a study trip to Florence. Directly afterwards, he was a recipient of a scholarship from the Kosciuszko Foundation in New York City.

In 1980 Waniek relocated away from Silesia. Since then he has lived and worked in Brwinów a short distance to the west of Warsaw, though he has continued to visit Silesia several times a year. In the context of his art, he has been quoted as saying that since moving away he has come to understand Silesia better ("Lepiej zrozumiałem Śląsk").

== Work ==
=== Artist ===
Henryk Waniek is a surrealist painter. Many of his works feature symmetrical overall designs and / or concentric shapes. He frequently incorporates very traditional features such as windows, drinking vessels, ladders, devils, rainbows and shooting stars. He himself speaks of a "magical vision" of the world. He expresses himself using traditional oil painting techniques. He also works with different types of drawings involving graphic art and poster art. From time to time he has diversified into the performing arts, designing stage sets. His works have featured in over 100 exhibitions and he has been honoured with various prizes.

=== Essayist ===
Henryk Waniek has published several volumes of essays. Topics that engage him include history and philosophy along with religious and mystical studies. He has a continuing fascination with the seemingly endless twists and complexities of the history and culture of Silesia. He is particularly known for his three volumes of essays on Silesia:

- "Hermes w Górach Śląskich " ("Hermes in Upper Silesia", 1994)
- "Opis podróży mistycznej z Oswięcimia do Zgorzelca" ("Description of a mystical journey from Auschwitz to Görlitz 1257–1957", 1996)
- "Pitagoras na trawie" ("Pythagoras on the Meadow", 1997)

A subsequent work, "Wyprzedaż duchów" ("Sale of Ghosts", 2007), describes a journey through the region that since the start of the twentieth century has become known as the Sudetenland ("Kraj Sudetów"). Waniek also writes literary criticism and, since 1971, has contributed regularly to cultural and literary journals.

=== Novelist ===
He has also authored four novels:

- "Dziady berlińskie" ("Grandfather from Berlin", 1995)
- "Dziady paryskie" ("Grandfather from Paris", 1998)
- "Finis Silesiae" ("The end of Silesia", 2003)
- "Jak Johannes Kepler jadąc do Żagania na Śląsku zahaczył o księżyc" ("How Jan Kapler found the moon while travelling to Żagań in Silesia", 2015)

=== Obiter scripta ===
In "Sprawa Hermesa" (Der Fall Hermes / "The Hermes case", 2007) Waniek tells the story of the controversial Prussian Rosicrucian theologian Hermann Daniel Hermes (1734–1807).

His collection of poems, short stories and stage miniatures appeared in 2013 under the title "Notatnik i modlitewnik drogowy" ("The travellers book of notes and prayers")

"Cmentarz nieśmiertelnych" ("Cemetery of the undead", 2015) is the story of the Szklarska Poręba artists' colony.

In 1998 Andrzej Titkow made a documentary film about Henryk Waniek under the title "Sztuka błądzenia" (loosely "The wanderer's art").

== Personal ==
Henryk Waniek married Joanna Pasiud in 1972. Their son and daughter were born in 1978 and 1985.
