= Piasecznik, Choszczno County =

Piasecznik
- Village
- Location within Poland
- Coordinates: 53°13′N 15°18′E
- Country: Poland
- Voivodeship: West Pomeranian
- County: Choszczno
- Gmina: Choszczno

Piasecznik [pjaˈsɛt͡ʂnik] (German: Petznick) is a village in the administrative district of Gmina Choszczno, within Choszczno County, West Pomeranian Voivodeship, in north-western Poland. It lies approximately 9 km (6 mi) north-west of Choszczno and 53 km (33 mi) south-east of the regional capital Szczecin.

For the history of the region, see History of Pomerania.
