= Stanisław Smoleń =

Polish diplomat

Stanisław Smoleń Ph.D.
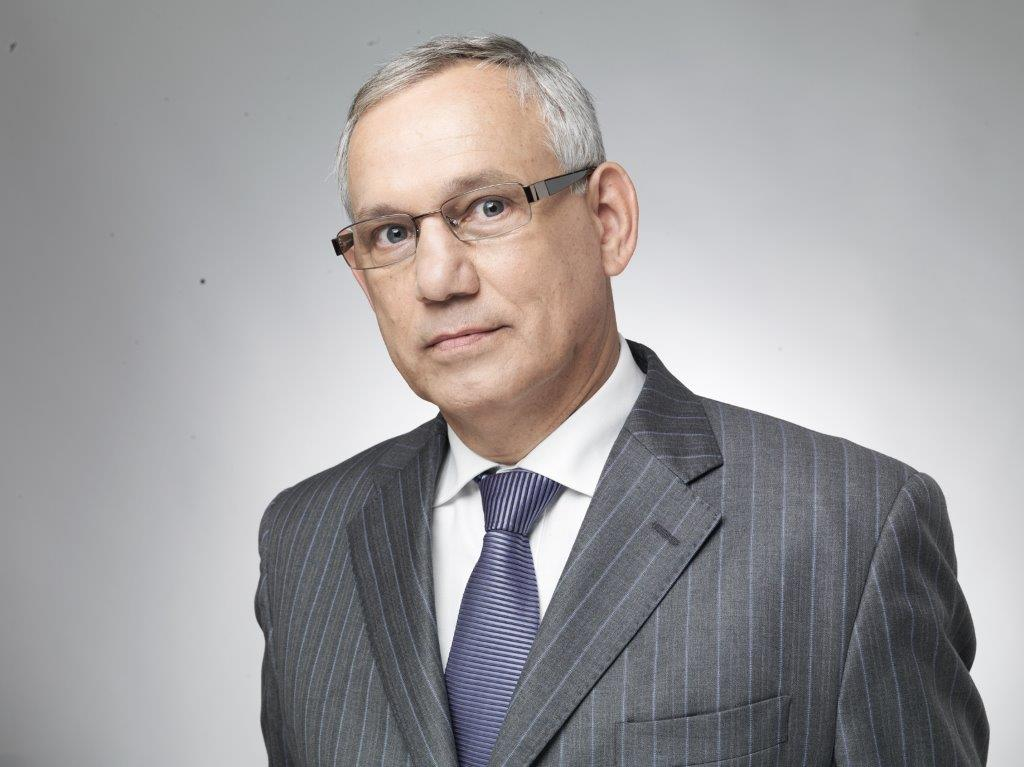

Poland Ambassador to Iraq
- In office 2008–2012
- Preceded by: Edward Pietrzyk
- Succeeded by: Lech Stefaniak

Personal details
- Born: October 22, 1952 (age 73) Limanowa
- Children: 3
- Education: Moscow State Institute of International Relations
- Profession: Diplomat

Stanisław Wojciech Smoleń (born 22 October 1952, Limanowa) is a Polish career diplomat, ambassador to Iraq (2008–2012).

== Life ==
Stanisław Smoleń began his studies at the Poznań Academy of Economics and, in 1977, graduated from international relations at the Moscow State Institute of International Relations specializing in Hindi and Urdu languages. He has been studying also at the Kabul University (1979–1980), Polish Institute of International Affairs (1983). In 1990, he received his Ph.D. from Diplomatic Academy in Moscow.

At the end of the 1970s and in the 1980s posted to the Polish embassies in Kabul, Afghanistan and Islamabad, Pakistan. Since the 1990s, his area of focus has been Middle East affairs. He opened Polish diplomatic missions in Sanaa, Yemen and Riyadh, Saudi Arabia, serving as chargé d'affaires and deputy chief of mission. As the embassy in Yemen was additionally accredited to Djibouti, Eritrea and Ethiopia, he frequently traveled to these countries.

Between 2004 and 2005, in the rank of Ambassador, he completed a year-long assignment as Political Advisor to the Poland-led Commanding Generals of the Multinational Division Central-South in Iraq. Stationed at the Division Headquarters in Babylon and Dewaniya and operating under front-line conditions, he handled civilian aspects of the Division's activities. At the turn of 2006–2007, served as the Head of the Embassy in Baghdad. From October 2008 until August 2012 posted to Baghdad again initially as Chargé d’Affaires a. i. and, since 2010, Ambassador Extraordinary and Plenipotentiary of the Republic of Poland to the Republic of Iraq. In August 2016 he returned to Baghdad to re-open the Embassy of the Republic of Poland, which had been suspended in September 2014 due to security reasons. He ended his post in 2018.

Over the past decades, he has held a variety of positions within the Polish Ministry of Foreign Affairs, including Deputy Chief of the Task Team for Iraq and Chairman of the Advisory Committee for the Middle East and Africa. Representative of the Ministry at various international conferences.

Smoleń is married, with three children. Besides Polish, he speaks fluently English, German, Russian, and Hindi. He is also communicative in French, Persian, and Arabic.

== Honours ==
- Gold Cross of Merit (2005)
- Silver Medal of Merit for National Defence
