= Molly Smolen =

American ballet dancer

Molly Smolen is an American ballet dancer.

== Life and career ==
Molly Smolen was born in Philadelphia, and trained at the Pennsylvania Academy of Ballet under John White and Margarita de Saa. At 14, she joined American Ballet Theatre and, from 1997 to 1999, she performed as a guest artist with the Estonian National Ballet.

Molly joined Birmingham Royal Ballet as a Soloist in 1999 and was promoted to Principal in 2002. Her performance of Five Brahms Waltzes in the Manner of Isadora Duncan brought her critical acclaim in many countries. She has shone in roles as diverse as the Siren in Prodigal Son and Maggie in Hobson's Choice. She is also a sparkling classical dancer, dancing most of the leading classical roles with the Estonian Ballet before she was 21.

Molly joined San Francisco Ballet as a Principal in 2006-2008.

Repertory: with Estonian National Ballet: principal roles in Giselle, Romeo and Juliet, The Sleeping Beauty and Swan Lake;

Repertory with BRB: works by Frederick Ashton (Five Brahms Waltzes in the Manner of Isadora Duncan, The Two Pigeons Gypsy Girl, La Fille mal gardée Lise, Scènes de ballet, Dante Sonata and Voices of Spring); George Balanchine (Concerto barocco - Leading Ballerina, Second Ballerina, Prodigal Son Siren, Western Symphony First Movement, Apollo Calliope); David Bintley (Arthur Morgan, Beauty and the Beast Belle, Carmina burana Fortuna, Sylvia Pas de deux, Scottish Dances, The Nutcracker Sweeties Sugar Rum Cherry, The Shakespeare Suite Juliet, The Seasons 'Autumn', Hobson's Choice Maggie Hobson, The Sons of Horus Isis, Concert Fantasy, Les Petit Riens, Orpheus Suite - Eurydice); John Cranko (Broulliards); Kenneth MacMillan (Romeo and Juliet Juliet, Elite Syncopations - White Girl); Vaslav Nijinski (Rite of Spring - The Chosen Maiden), and Myrtha, Giselle (Giselle), Sugar Plum Fairy (The Nutcracker), Swanhilda (Coppelia), Odette /Odile (Swan Lake), Aurora (The Sleeping Beauty), Stanton Welch (Powder) and Twyla Tharp In the Upper Room;

Repertory with SFB: works by Helgi Tomasson Clara (The Nutcracker), Kitri (Don Quixote), The Sleeping Beauty, Giselle, On Common Ground; Val Caniparoli Nora (Ibsen's house); George Balanchine Third Movement (Symphony in C) Molly Smolen retired in 2008.

== Awards ==
She won bronze medal and the Prix de Nina Ricci, for artistic excellence at the Varna International Ballet Competition; bronze medal at the Osaka International Ballet Competition, 1995; Critics' Circle nomination for Newcomer of the Year (2000).
