= Jewish cemetery in Skwierzyna =

Jewish cemetery in Poland

Coordinates: 52°35′32″N 15°30′34″E

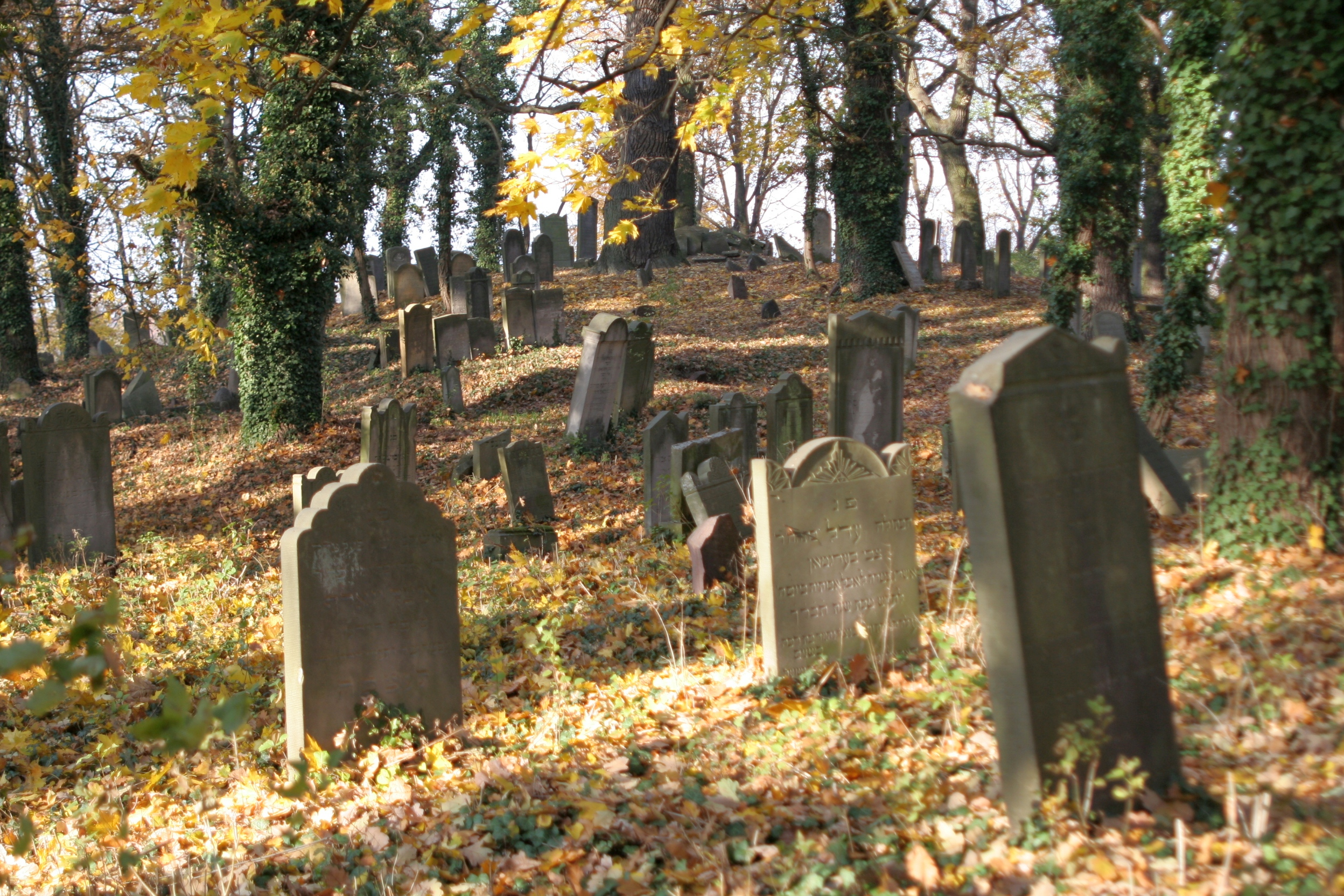
- View of the cemetery hill
- Interactive map of Jewish cemetery in Skwierzyna

Details
- Closed: 1930s
- Location: Skwierzyna
- Country: Poland
- Type: Jewish
- Size: 2.23 ha (5.5 acres)
- No. of graves: over 250

Jewish cemetery in Skwierzyna is one of the largest Jewish cemeteries in Lubusz Voivodeship. The cemetery covers an area of about 2.23 ha. In 2002 there were 247 tombstones (massebot). The tombstones located there are among the most valuable monuments in Skwierzyna.

The oldest preserved massebot on the cemetery date back to the beginning of the 18th century, although the cemetery probably existed since the 15th century. The cemetery functioned until the 1930s and was one of the few not to have been devastated during World War II. It was not until the 1970s that the local authorities began a "cleanup" of the cemetery area, which would lead to its complete liquidation. Attempts to renovate the cemetery were made in 1992, but there were no funds for this at the time. Only the financial and organizational support of several charitable institutions made it possible to restore the cemetery in 2002. Just a year later, the cemetery was again vandalized by unknown perpetrators. Restoration efforts of a limited nature were carried out in the following years.

== History of the cemetery ==
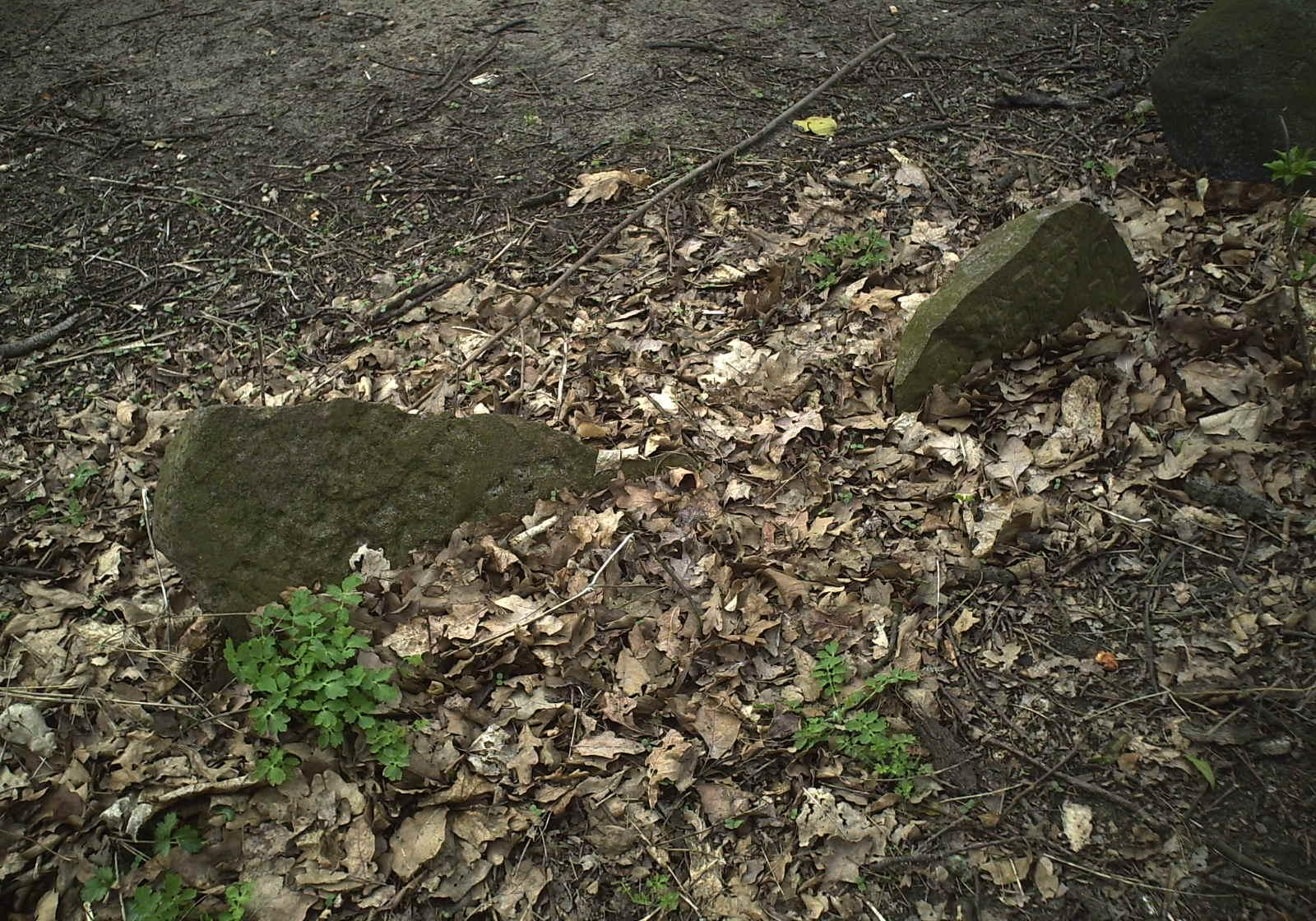
The oldest tombstones, dating back to 1736

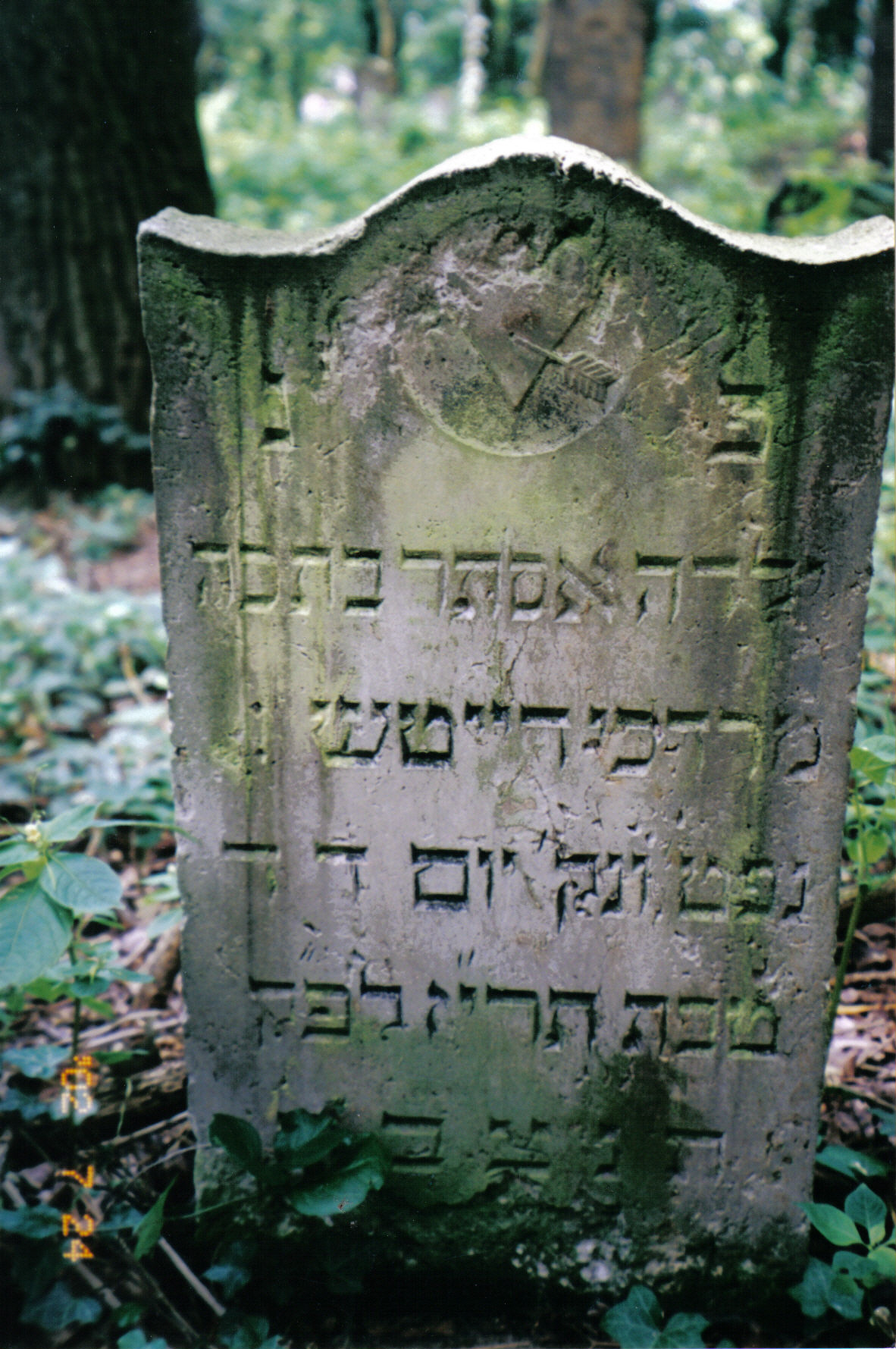
Tombstone of Ester Dajcz who died and was buried on December 31, 1856

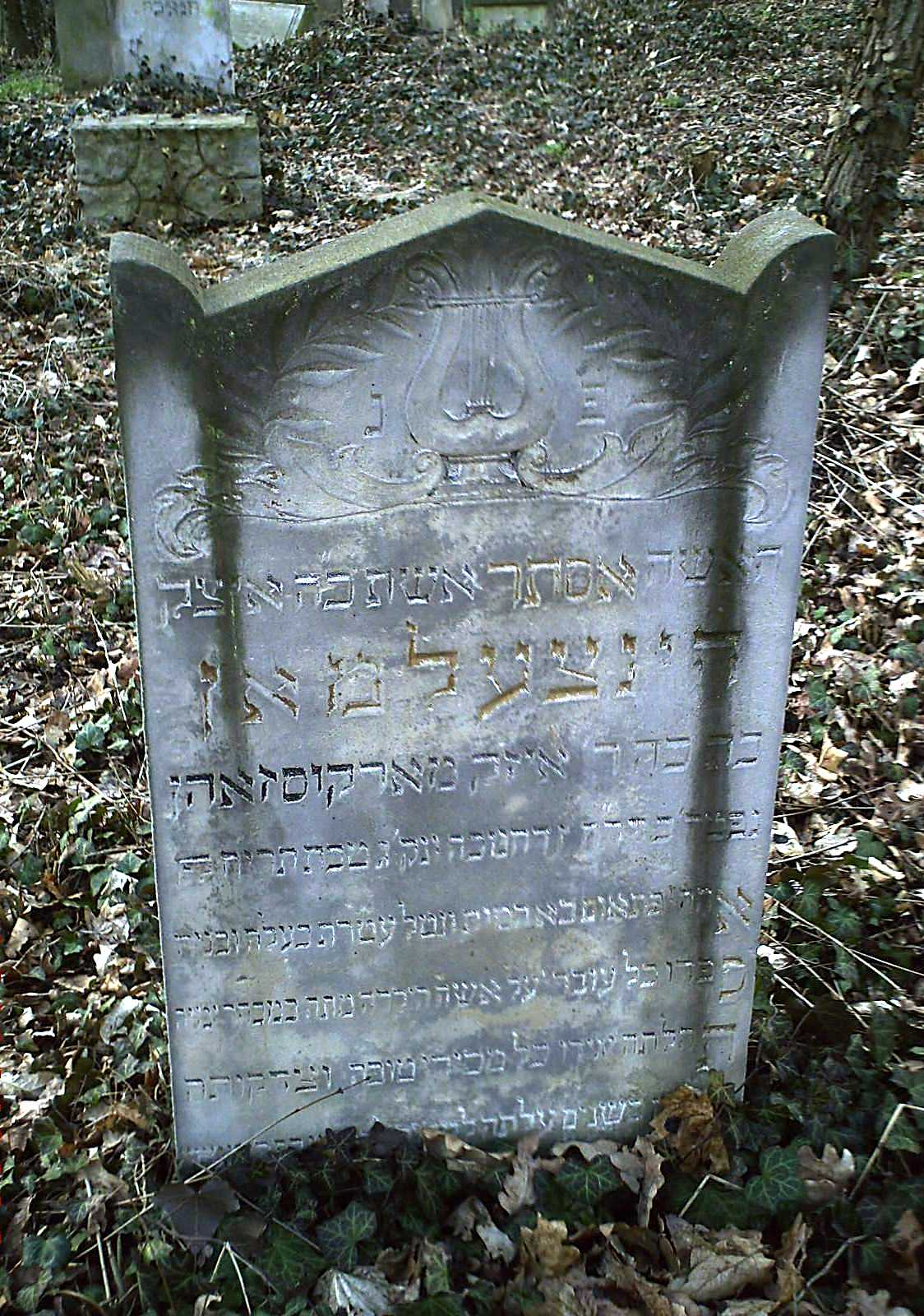
Tombstone with lyre motif and visible remnants of gold polychromy

The exact date of the establishment of the cemetery is unknown, although it can be presumed from the dating of the oldest tombstone that burials began there in the early 18th century. It is estimated that since the beginnings of the Jewish community in Skwierzyna date back to the 15th century, there must have been an older Jewish cemetery, which may have been located near the old Protestant cemetery, traces of which have until recently been noticeable on today's Jan III Sobieski Street.

The last dead were buried there in the 1930s, when there were almost no Jews left in the city. The cemetery survived the times of Nazism and the wartime conflagration almost intact. This state remained more or less until the mid-1960s, by which time the necropolis had not suffered more seriously at the hands of man.

The turn of the 1960s and 1970s, however, was a period of organized activity by the local authorities aimed at officially "cleaning up" the cemetery, and actually destroying it completely. For some time a campaign was carried out to dismantle and export tombstones made of the more precious materials – some of them even made their way to Poznań and Szczecin, where they were used for construction purposes. In the early 1970s, a company carried out the dismantling of particularly valuable tombstones, family tombs made of black Swedish marble and metal wrought-iron fences.

In addition, the cemetery was vandalized by local residents. Many of the massebot were stolen by them, and served as elements of the foundations of nearby single-family houses. The cemetery gradually became overgrown with bushes, and to make matters worse, it became a meeting place for the local social fringe. For the above reasons, most of the tombstones did not stand the test of time and either fell over or cracked. Also working against them was a considerable accumulation of garbage and fallen, rotting leaves. Periodic cleaning of the cemetery grounds, which was carried out by students of Skwierzyna schools under the direction of teachers, was not enough. In addition to the destruction and theft of massebot, many graves were dug up in search of valuable items allegedly carried by the dead.

In 1992 Waldemar Chrostowski, provincial conservator of monuments, entered the Skwierzyna Jewish cemetery in the register of monuments. At his behest, the cemetery was inspected by Henryk Grecki (from Pracownia Zieleni Zabytkowej in Szczecin) and Ryszard Patorski (museum in Międzyrzecz), taking photos of 162 massebot. Translation of the inscriptions on the tombstones was handled by Paweł Woronczak, and documentation of this inventory was sent, among others, to the Jewish Historical Institute in Warsaw.

In June 2002, on the initiative of the Skwierzyna Association for Economic Development and with financial support from the Ford Foundation and the Academy for the Development of Philanthropy in Poland, the "To Restore Memory" project took place (its value amounted to 26.5 thousand PLN). The area was cleaned up, overturned massebot cleaned and repositioned. Information boards were placed on the cemetery grounds, with information on the history of the Skwierzyna Jews, and wooden steps were built to facilitate the approach up one of the sandy slopes of the hill. In addition to hired workers and students from local high schools, young Germans from the Mauritius Gymnasium in Büren near Paderborn also took part in the project. The opening of the restored necropolis, attended by representatives of the Jewish religious community from Szczecin, was combined with a scientific conference and an exhibition of photographs depicting the cemetery.

A year later, on the night of November 9–10, 2003, the cemetery was vandalized. On the website of the anti–racist organization "Never Again", in the so–called "Brown Book," the event was described as follows:

SKWIERZYNA. Around November 11, unknown neo-Nazis profaned a Jewish cemetery. They destroyed tombstones with German, Hebrew and Jewish inscriptions. (Note: The author most likely meant Yiddish inscriptions, which are absent from the Skwierzyna Jewish cemetery. There are inscriptions on the massebot only in Hebrew or German.) They also drew swastikas and SS symbols and wrote: Jude raus and Kristall Nacht. This cemetery, shortly before the racist act, was restored by the residents of Skwierzyna. (Note: Description from Gazeta Wyborcza: "Skwierzyna. (...) Jewish cemetery was profaned and destroyed on Independence Day. From the very entrance to the cemetery one can see broken massebot with inscriptions in Yiddish, Hebrew or German. Someone has painted swastikas, distinctive "SS" signs, on the sandstone tombstones. Some of the massebot are broken, overturned and cracked." - R. Ochwat, They devastated the Jewish cemetery, [in:] Gazeta Wyborcza, Gorzow Wlkp., November 13, 2003.)

Many tombstones have been overturned or broken. Most of the inscriptions made by the vandals were successfully removed, but the municipality's coffers still lack the money for a complete renovation of the cemetery. The perpetrators of the desecration were not detected, and the matter was quickly trivialized. The cemetery is deteriorating again. Despite this, young people from the local high school regularly clean it up, clearing the necropolis of trash and fallen leaves.

In July 2014, the Skwierzyna municipality renovated the stairs leading to the necropolis from the city center. The total cost of this project was nearly 29 thousand PLN, of which about 15 thousand was a grant from the EU Rural Development Program.

In April 2015, the cemetery was cleaned up by a group of volunteers from the German association "Signs of Penance." They cleaned some of the tombstones, collected trash and set up the toppled massebot.

== Location ==
Today the Jewish cemetery in Skwierzyna is the only surviving physical trace of the centuries–old Jewish presence in the town. According to Jewish tradition, it is located on a hill, which before World War II in German was called Judenberg ("Jewish Hill", the former German name of this hill is not currently used by Skwierzyna residents), located on Mickiewicz Street, near the access road to Międzyrzecz. It is known that Jews from neighboring Murzynowo were also buried there.

The cemetery covers an area of about 2.23 hectares, although it is estimated that it could have been much larger. It is the second largest Jewish cemetery in Lubusz Voivodeship in terms of area. The largest cemetery is located in Słubice (2.35 hectares), but it is much poorer if one takes into account the number of preserved massebot. (Note: There are only three massebot there, set up after 1999 in honor of the three rabbis who rest there (K. Bielawski. "Słubice" (in Polish).).) The area of the cemetery is not clearly separated from the rest of the hills, no wall or fence has been preserved. Only the remains of the stone gate of the property directly bordering the cemetery are visible. The whole area is covered with deciduous forest, mostly oaks overgrown with ivy. It borders directly with the Catholic (former Evangelical) cemetery, located at the northern foot of the hill. The necropolis is about 2 km from the city center.

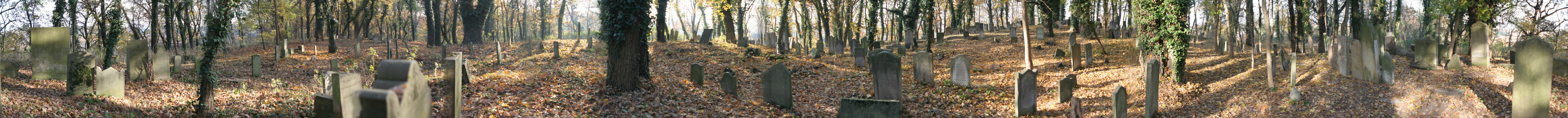
Panoramic view of the Jewish cemetery in Skwierzyna

== Tombstones ==
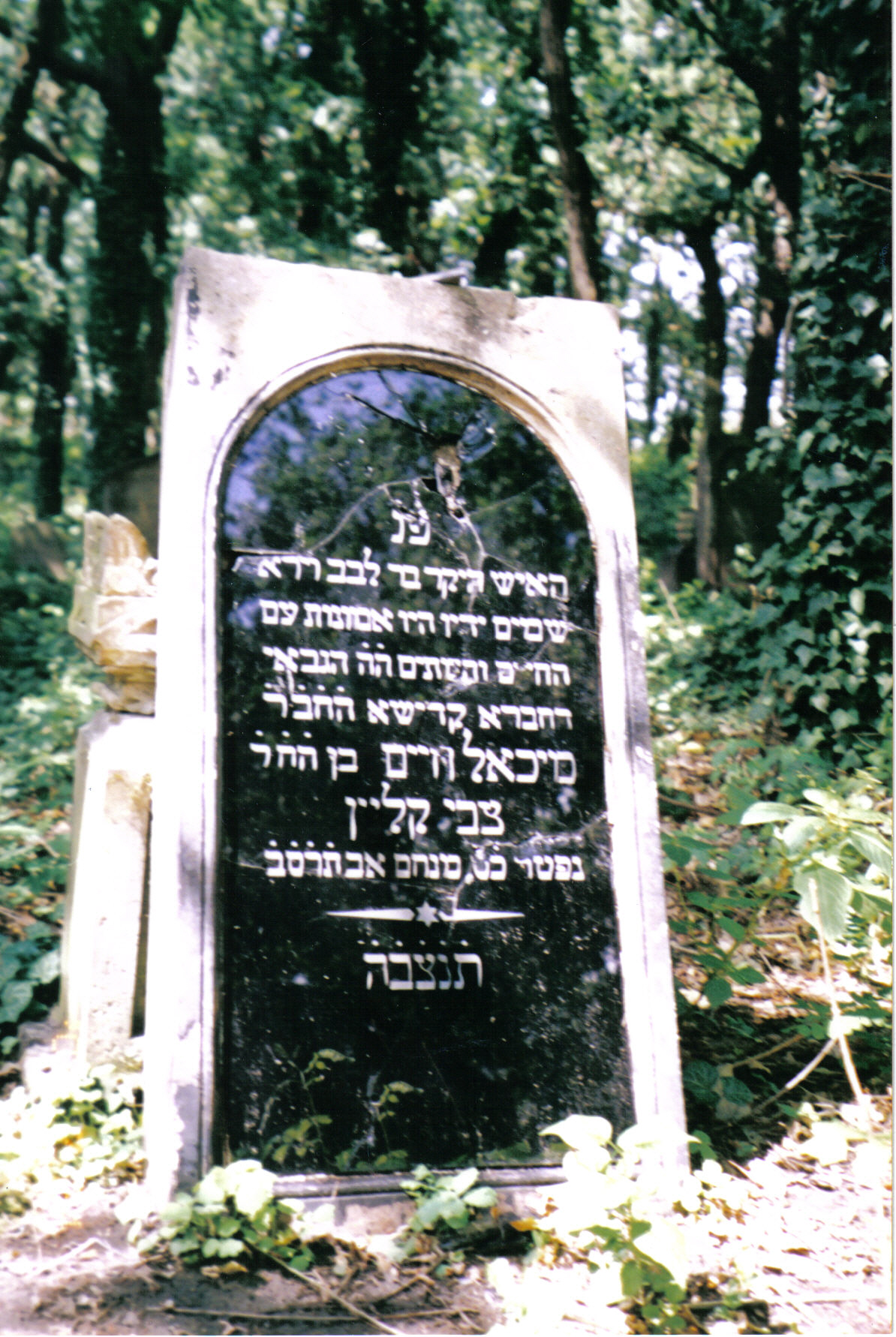
Tombstone with black glass plaque

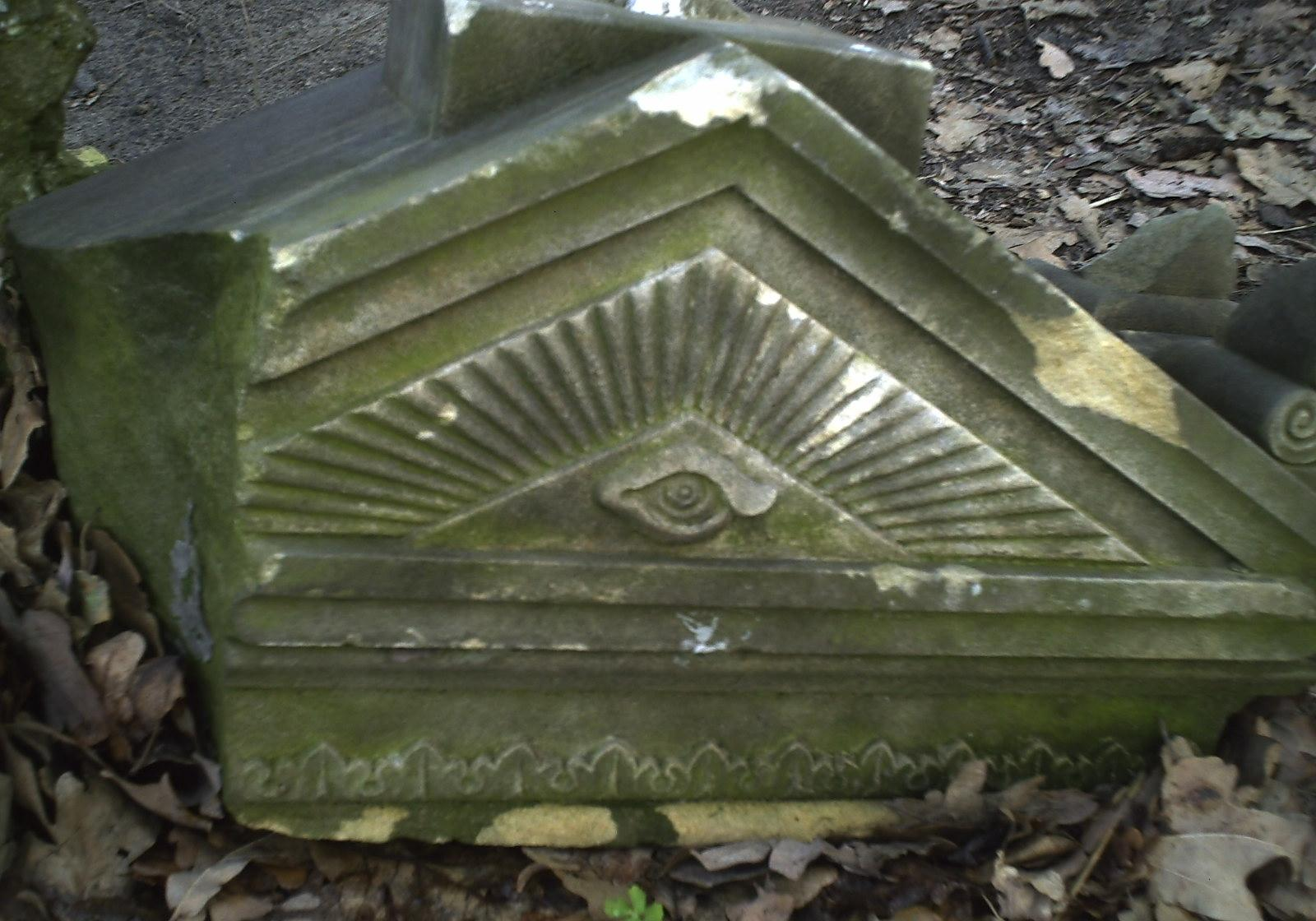
The motif of the "eye of providence"

In 2007 there were 247 tombstones (massebot) in the cemetery, and there are data that immediately after World War II there were also remains of a funeral house, a well, a fence and a gate. The oldest preserved tombstone dates back to 1736, when Skwierzyna was still within the borders of the First Republic.

Most of the tombstones, measuring from a few dozen centimeters to as much as 1.5 meters high, are made of richly decorated gray or pink sandstone. Granite massebot are less common. They are usually finished in a triangular or semicircular shape. The oldest massebot, however, are made of ordinary field stones; for the (seemingly) poorer deceased they are not even shaped into a cuboid. Until recently, one could also admire massebot enriched with tasteful plaques made of black glass, but due to their considerable value, they have become an object of theft. Small shards of this glass are to this day strewn along the paths winding between the massebot.

Some of the tombstones have remnants of colorful ornaments, polychromes, which, however, have not managed to resist the effects of time. Several particularly ornate massebot are equipped at the top with a stone ornament, resembling a pinecone, fixed with a metal wire running through the interior of the stone.

One of the tombstones resembles a cylinder or column in shape, and is styled like a tree trunk – it has carved bark and a short branch. It lacks a plaque, so it is not known who rests under it. Many more tombstones of this type can be found in the nearby old Catholic cemetery, which may indicate the influence that Catholic sacred art had on Jewish art.

The oldest grave stones are located at the very top of the hill, in its western part, according to the order of burials that used to take place there. First the dead were buried on the highest part of the hill, going lower and lower for lack of space. In the northeastern and eastern parts of the cemetery one can find the foundations of the tombs of the wealthier dead, perhaps remnants of the so–called ohelim. The central part, on the other hand, is filled with children's graves.

Some of the tombstones are described twice – on the front there are inscriptions in Hebrew, and on the back in German. The obligation to mark massebot in this way was introduced for Jews living in the Prussian state in the 1830s. Data most often appearing on tombstones:

- name of the deceased,
- date of death (given in a simplified form, characterized by not including thousands, that is, in Hebrew, "according to a simplified count" – קפל),
- date of burial,
- information that speaks of the profession or occupation of the deceased (such as a rabbi or teacher),
- finally, the phrase "May his/her soul be bound in the pouch of the living" (written with the Hebrew abbreviation הבצנת).

=== Symbolism ===
The massebot found in the Jewish cemetery in Skwierzyna are richly decorated. The community living in the town was strongly influenced by Jewish Germans and Protestantism, which is partly reflected in the sacred art present in the cemetery. The ornaments found on the tombstones tell a lot about the dead resting beneath them.

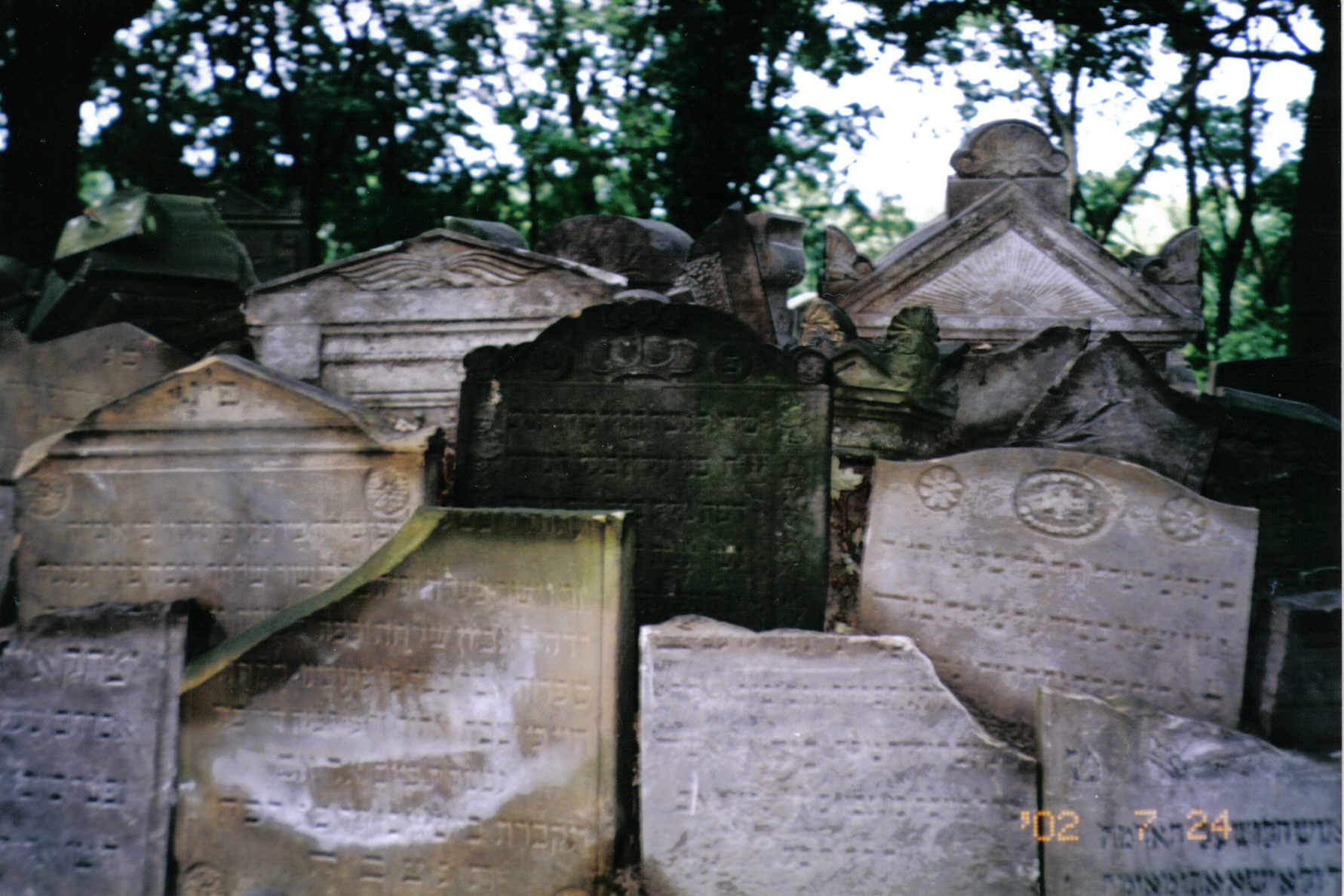
Lapidarium, the massebot display symbols including crowns, palm leaves and the so-called "eye of providence"

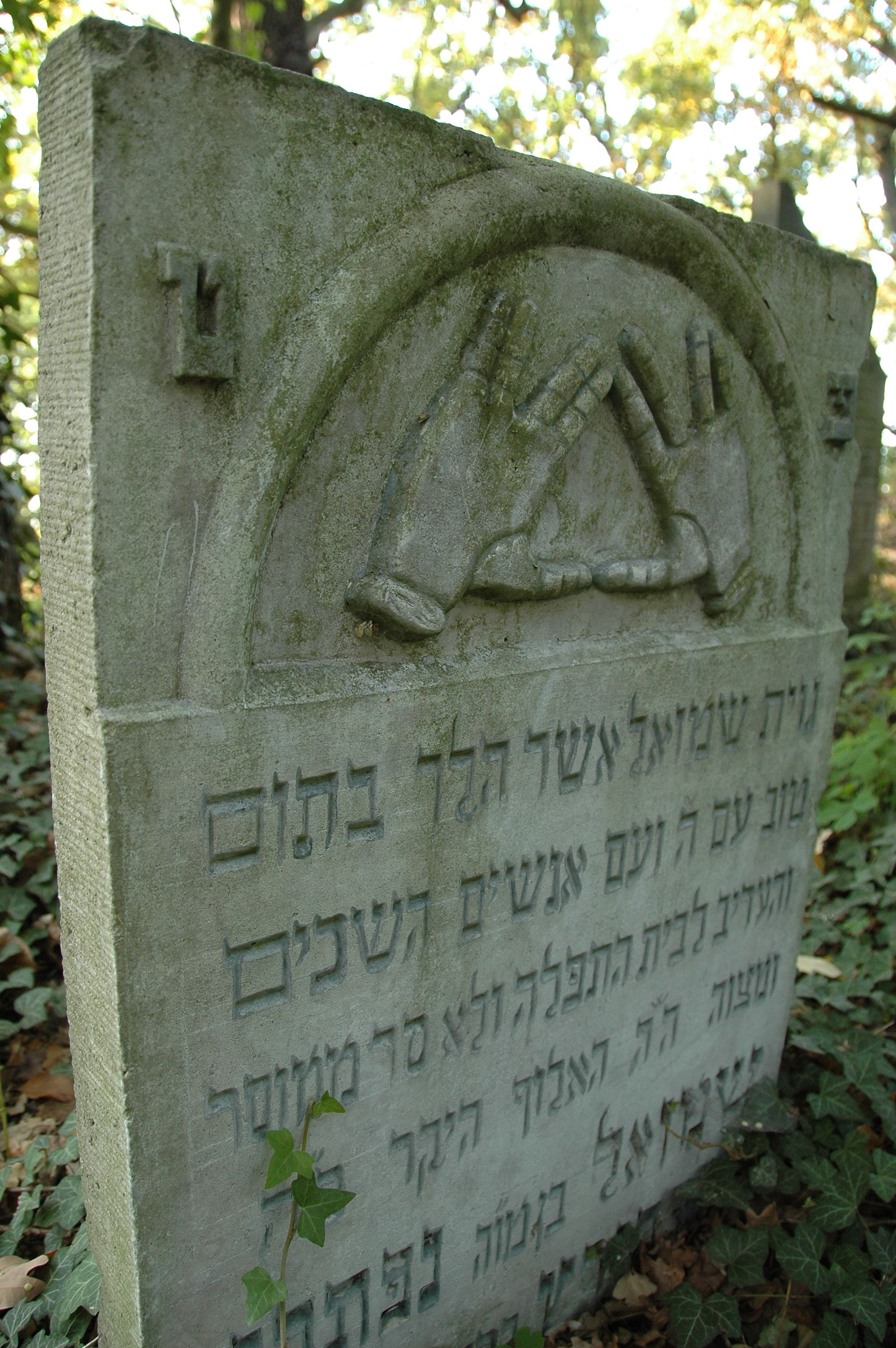
Hand symbol – the tomb of a priest (cohen)

Motifs most often appearing on massebot:

- Priest's hands – arranged in a gesture of priestly blessing (Hebrew: Birkat ha-kohanim), (Note: Administered with the face facing the praying people, with the hands raised in the air and positioned in a peculiar way: two fingers spread apart and thumbs next to each other. Today, the blessing is given by the prayer leader every day in Israel, and in the Diaspora on holidays and during Yamim Noraim (Borzymińska, Zofia; Żebrowski, Rafał (2003). "Błogosławieństwo kapłańskie". Polski słownik judaistyczny – dzieje, kultura, religia, ludzie. Vol. 1. Warsaw. p. 211. ISBN 83-7255-126-X.)) most often on the graves of those who served in the synagogue, considered descendants of the high priest Aaron. Those buried in graves with such tombstones most often bear the name Cohen (Hebrew for priest). (Note: Also: Kohen, Kohn, Kon, Cohn, Kahan, Kahane, Kogan, Kagan, Kahn.) The hand symbol appears on 11 massebot.
- A book – the person buried was a scribe or a rabbi. This motif can be found on the tombstone of David Mayer, which is still preserved today.
- Eye of providence – the motif most characteristic of the Skwierzyna cemetery, the most common on this cemetery. Shows the strong influence of Protestantism on the Jewish community in Skwierzyna. This motif appears on 21 massebot.
- A lion – signifies a person named Yehuda Arie or Leib (Hebrew and Yiddish for lion, respectively), or someone who is extremely strong or courageous; occurs on 2 tombstones.
- A hand pouring water from a pitcher – on the graves of people from the lineage of Levite, washing the hands of the priest before the service. A motif found on 9 massebot.
- A broken flower or tree – a symbol of unexpected and violent death. On several (3) massebot also a flower with a butterfly, a symbol of the wandering of souls; the motif of a broken tree appears on 12 massebot, and a broken flower on a further 11.
- A crown – an ambiguous symbol, used to show respect to the deceased, as a scribe or the head of a family or some larger community. Its placement meant that the deceased deserved to receive a "crown of good name" (keter shem tov); symbol found on 2 tombstones.
- A lyre – the deceased was a musician or even a synagogue cantor; found on 2 tombstones.
- Palm branch – a symbol of redemption, also considered a symbol of righteous people who will enjoy eternal life, as well as individuals who are good and virtuous, but do not know Torah; appears on 5 gravestones.
- Heart pierced by an arrow – a sign that the departure of this deceased (perhaps sudden) caused unusual pain to those close to him; a unique motif (appearing on only one matzevah), indicating the secularization of the symbolism.

However, no tombstone has survived with a motif of a hand holding a knife – a symbol of a mohel (circumciser) performing ritual circumcision. The person engaged in performing such procedures must have been a member of the Skwierzyna Jewish community, given its size and importance. On the sides of each relief can be found the Hebrew letters Pe and Nun (נ and פ), which are an abbreviation of the tombstone maxim Here lies.

=== Grave of David Meyer ===
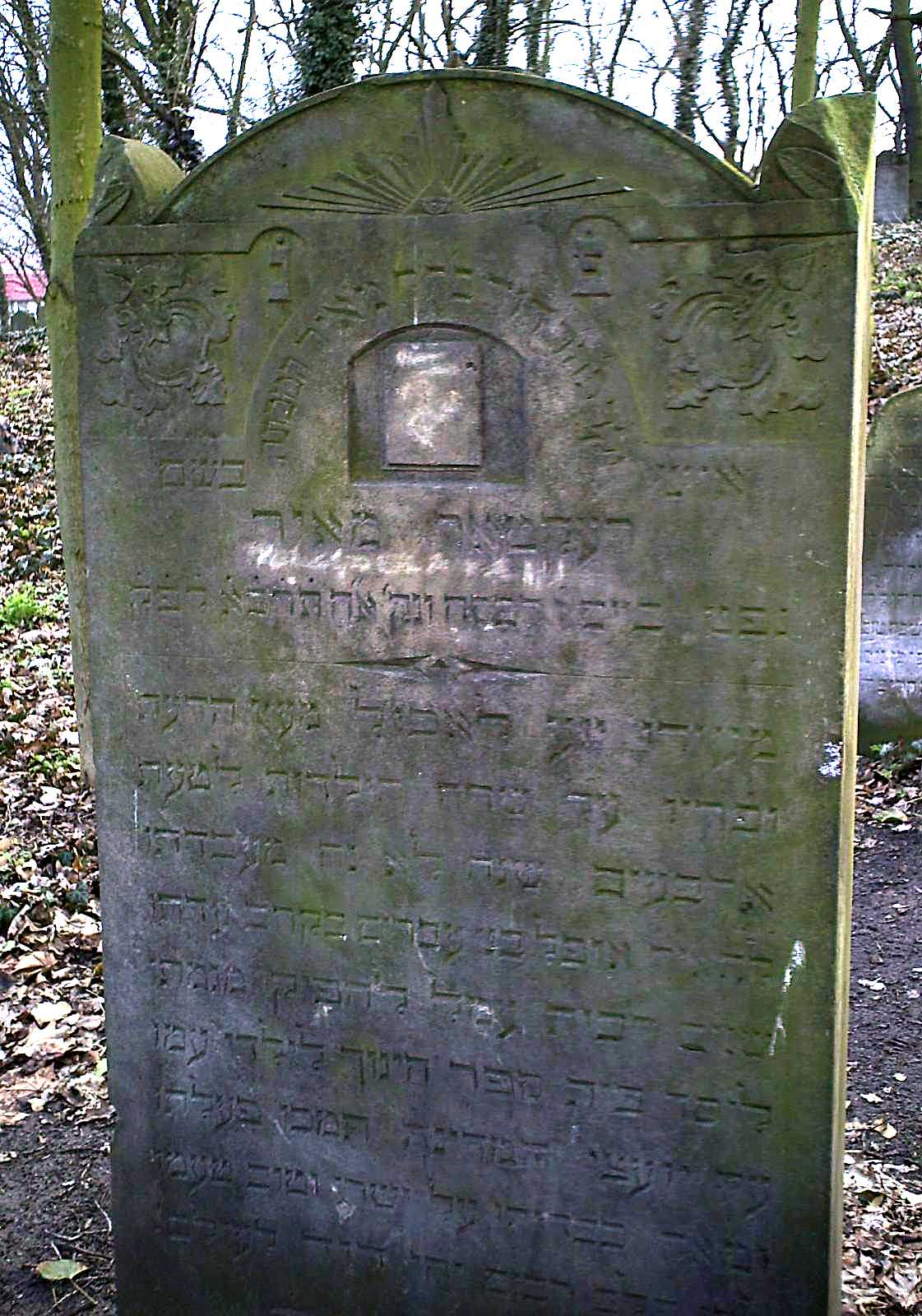
Tombstone of David Meyer, visible symbol of the book

David Meyer is perhaps the most interesting figure resting in the Skwierzyna cemetery. He was the rector of a Jewish elementary school and a great supporter of Jewish enlightenment – haskalah. He postulated the introduction of a new model of education. As the written sources of his contemporaries emphasize, he was an opponent of beating children in school, which for those times was a complete novelty.

Meyer taught Hebrew, German, French, Italian, Latin, as well as music. His grave is located in the northern part of the cemetery, distinguished by the height of the tombstone, as well as the motif of a thick book carved on it, a symbol of the buried man's wisdom. The inscription on the matzevah reads:

Here lies a dear husband, the honorable Mr. David, the honorable son of Mr. Meir, called by the name of Rector Meir. He passed away on the 7th day of Pesach and was buried on the day after the holiday, 621 according to a short account. He always exerted himself to eat from the tree of knowledge, and planted the fruit in the field of childhood. Forty years he did not rest from his work – to illuminate the darkness of the sons of Hebrews in his congregation. Many years he toiled to make his goal a reality, to establish a school for the children of his people. Until the counselors of the state supported his deed and praised him greatly for his righteousness and prudence. Therefore, in the hearts of many, David will live forever! Let his soul be tied up in the sack of the living. (Translated from Hebrew by P. Woronczak)

David Meyer died on April 1, 1861.

=== Other tombstones ===
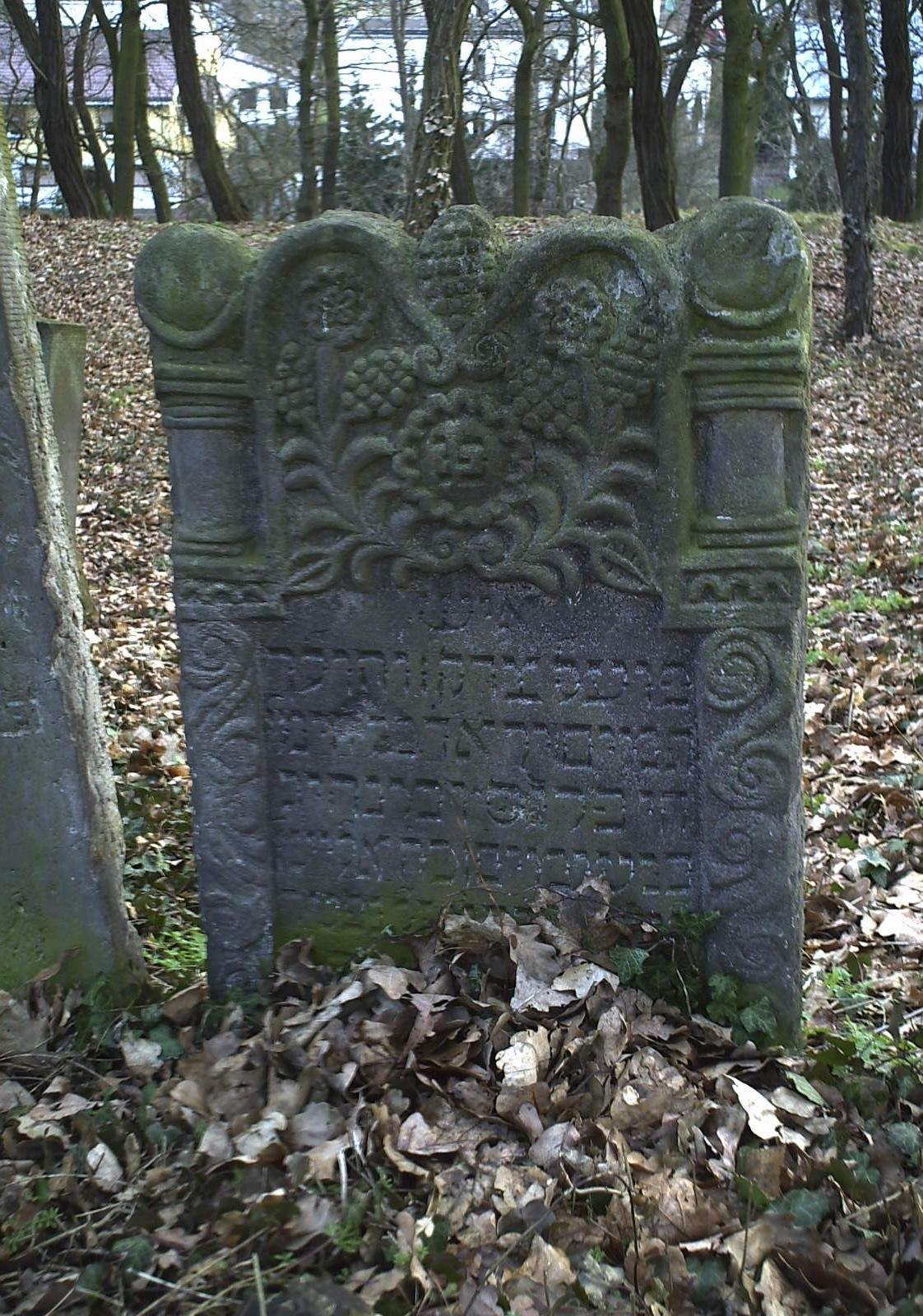
Matzevah from 1806, tombstone of Eliezer Lipman

Other tombstones read, for example:

- Matzevah with the symbol of angel wings: Here buried: Angels and men have grasped the coffin, woe to the day, the day of wrath and destruction. Look at the greatness of misery and the cup of misery. The angels were victorious and the coffin was snatched. This is the penetrating rabbi, the famous one, our teacher and Mr. Aharon Kamin of blessed memory, whose mourning will be mourned by every eye and melt every heart over the doom without measure. And it was, when the coffin was set out to rest, Wednesday 12 elul 546 according to a brief account of time. May his soul be bound in the sack of the living. He died on September 5, 1786.
- Photo on the right: Here buried a husband who did justice and acted impeccably. He feared the Lord all his days, he was the elder of the community, the esteemed Mr. Eliezer Lipman B.R.M. He passed away and was buried in good tishri "prince of life" (568) according to a short account. May his soul be bound in the sack of the living. He died on October 6, 1806.
- Matzevah with an image of a lion: Here buried Rabbi Leib Britischer. He passed away in good fame and was buried on Sunday 589. May his soul be bound in the sack of the living. He died on the 7th of twet 5589, or December 22, 1838.
- A tombstone with the symbol of a tree with an ax driven into its trunk: Here was buried the child Tojba, daughter of the respected Mr. Hirsh B.Sh. Shtenger. She passed away on Sunday and was buried on Tuesday, 9 szwat 607, according to a short account. May her soul be bound in the sack of the living. She died on 7 shvat 5607, or January 21, 1847, and was buried on Tuesday 9 shvat 5607, or January 23, 1847.
- Matzevah with ornament of a broken bush: Here buried child Aharon, son of a scholar. He passed away on Sunday 18 tamuz of the year 626, according to a short account. May his soul be bound in the sack of the living. He died on 26 tamuz 5626, or June 30, 1866.

== Bibliography ==
- Borzymińska, Zofia; Żebrowski, Rafał (2003). Polski słownik judaistyczny – dzieje, kultura, religia, ludzie. Vol. 1. Warsaw. ISBN 83-7255-126-X.
- Borzymińska, Zofia; Żebrowski, Rafał (2003). Polski słownik judaistyczny – dzieje, kultura, religia, ludzie. Vol. 2. Warsaw. ISBN 83-7255-175-8.
- Kemlein, Sophia (2001). Żydzi w Wielkim Księstwie Poznańskim 1814-1848. Poznań. ISBN 83-7177-155-X.
- Kirmiel, Andrzej (2004). Skwierzyna – miasto pogranicza: historia miasta do 1945 roku. Bydgoszcz. ISBN 83-918939-4-4.
- Kirmiel, Andrzej (2002). Żydzi w Skwierzynie. Gorzów Wielkopolski. ISBN 83-917148-0-2.
- Kornak, Marcin (2009). Brunatna Księga 1987-2009 (PDF). Chodzież. ISBN 978-83-928440-0-6.
