= Skwierzyna =

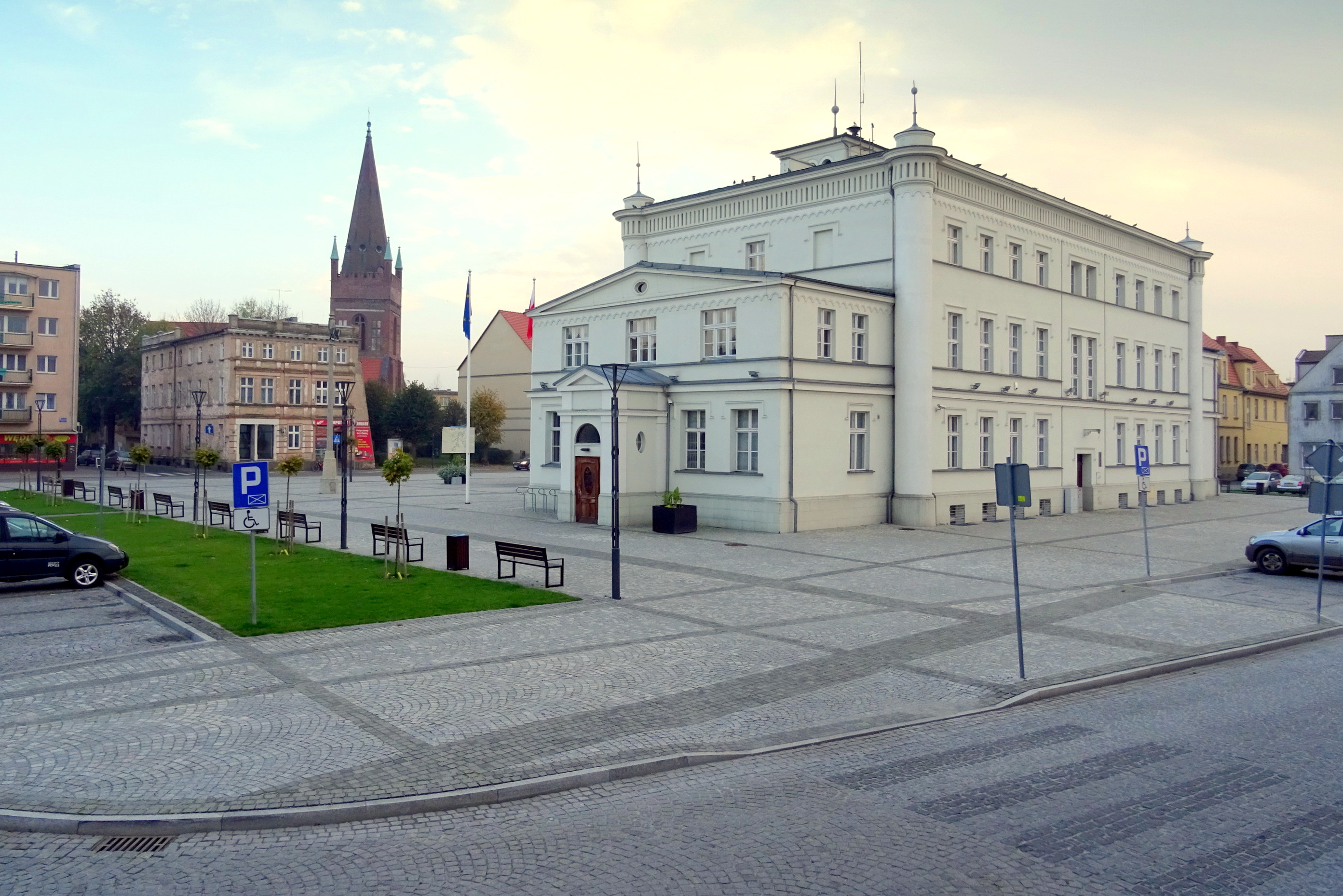
- Market Square with the town hall in the foreground and the Saint Nicholas church in the background

- Flag Coat of arms

- Location within Poland
- Coordinates: 52°36′N 15°30′E
- Country: Poland
- Voivodeship: Lubusz
- County: Międzyrzecz
- Gmina: Skwierzyna
- Town rights: before 1296

Government
  - Mayor: Wojciech Kowalewski

Area
  - Total: 35.89 km^{2} (13.86 sq mi)

Population (2023-12-31)
  - Total: 9,078
  - Density: 252.9/km^{2} (655.1/sq mi)
- Time zone: UTC+1 (CET)
  - Summer (DST): UTC+2 (CEST)
- Postal code: 66-440
- Car plates: FMI
- Website: https://www.skwierzyna.pl

Skwierzyna (Polish pronunciation: [skfʲɛˈʐɨna]; German: Schwerin an der Warthe) is a town in Lubusz Voivodeship in western Poland, serving as the administrative seat of the Gmina Skwierzyna. As of 31 December 2023, it had a population of 9,078 inhabitants. It is located at the confluence of the Obra and Warta rivers, about 18 km (11 mi) north of Międzyrzecz and 23 km (14 mi) south-east of the regional capital Gorzów Wielkopolski. The town is situated in a particularly green part of Poland. Extensive forests and numerous lakes can be found in the vicinity.

== History ==
Skwierzyna was originally a Slavic fishing settlement, located on an important trade route connecting Szczecin and Kraków. It became part of the emerging Polish state in the 10th century. During the fragmentation period in Polish history, from 1138 it belonged to the Duchy of Greater Poland and from 1296 to 1329 to the Duchy of Głogów. Afterwards it was located in the Poznań Voivodeship within the larger Greater Poland Province. It already held town privileges upon the death of the Piast King Przemysł II of Poland in 1296, renewed by King Władysław II Jagiełło in 1406. The population was predominantly Polish, Jewish and German. The colonization of the area was largely implemented by the Cistercian monks of nearby Paradyż Abbey, a filial monastery of Lehnin Abbey in the Margraviate of Brandenburg. In 1530 Skwierzyna was granted a coat of arms and in 1543 became a royal town of the Polish Crown.

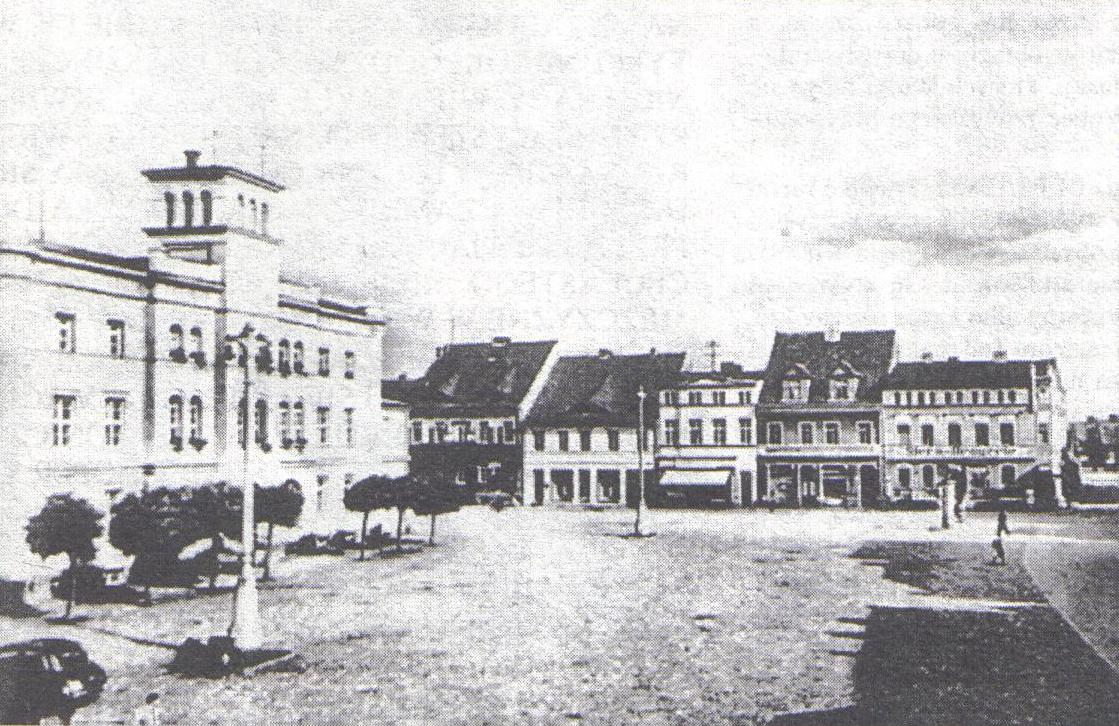
Early 20th-century view of the Market Square

In the course of the Second Partition of Poland in 1793, Skwierzyna was annexed together with the whole region of Greater Poland by the Kingdom of Prussia. Following the successful Greater Poland uprising, it was part of the Polish Duchy of Warsaw between 1807 and 1815. It was incorporated into the Kreis Birnbaum of the Grand Duchy of Posen in 1815, which became the Province of Posen in 1848. In 1871 it became part of the German Empire. From 1887 it was the administrative seat of Kreis Schwerin within the Prussian Province of Posen. Many Polish inhabitants took part in the Greater Poland uprising (1918–19), aimed at reuniting the town with Poland after it regained independence in 1918. While the Polish side argued that the town was part of historic Greater Poland, i.e. the cradle of the Polish state, and should thus be incorporated into the reborn Poland by historical rights, the town's population was German-speaking by large majority, and it was thus assigned to remain in Germany as part of the province of Posen-West Prussia.

Posen-West Prussia was dissolved in 1938 and Schwerin became part of the Province of Brandenburg. During World War II, in 1939 and 1940, a German concentration camp for Poles operated in the town. The town was part of Germany until occupation by the Red Army on 31 January 1945. At the end of World War II the town became again part of Poland per the Potsdam Agreement as demanded by the Soviet Union. The Soviet-installed communist regime stayed in power until the Fall of Communism in the 1980s.

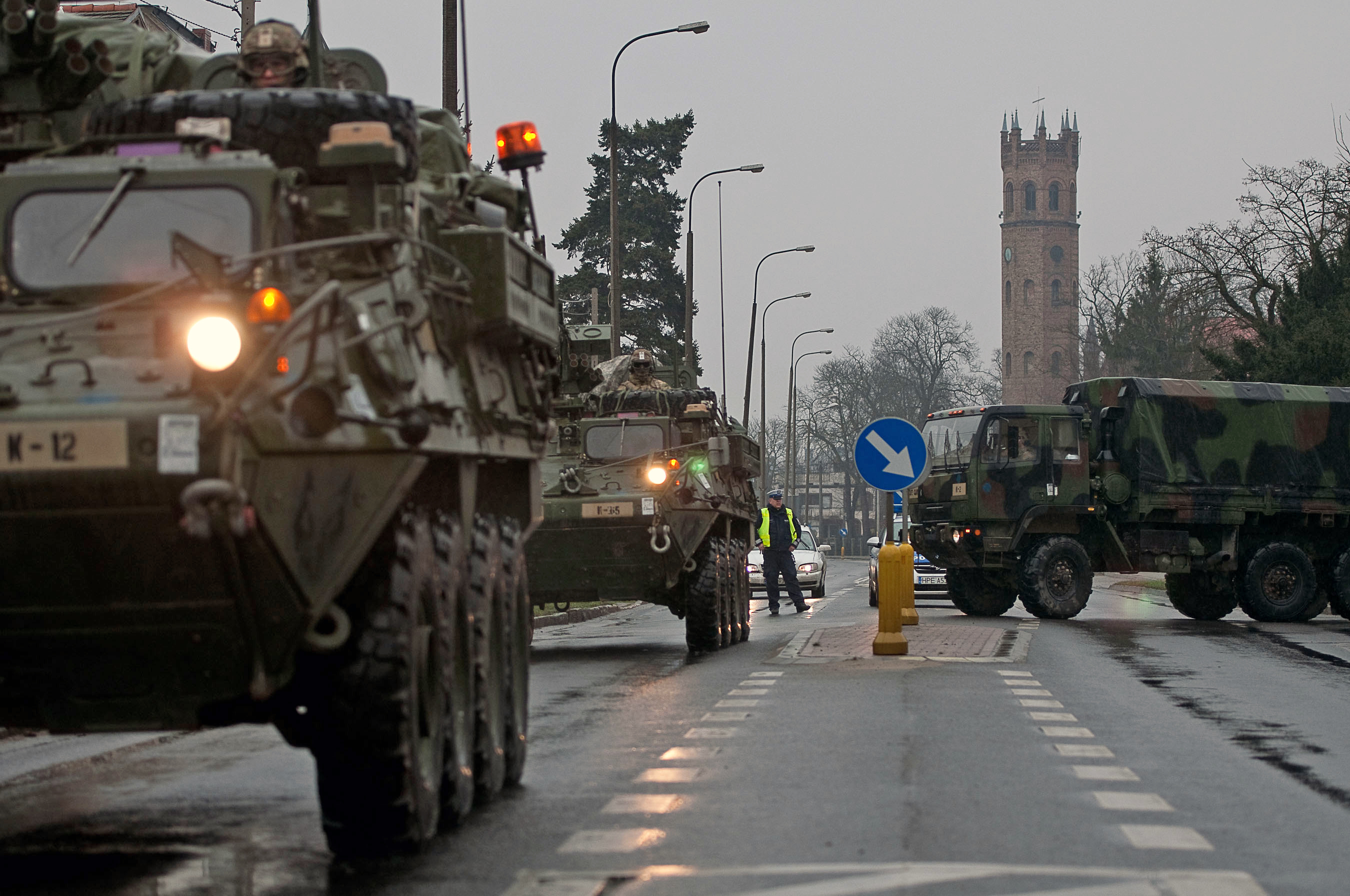
American troops in Skwierzyna during the Operation Dragoon Ride military exercise in 2015

The first post-war mayor was local Pole Stanisław Runge. The remaining pre-war Polish inhabitants were joined by Poles displaced from former eastern Poland annexed by the Soviet Union. The first such group of 800 Poles arrived in Skwierzyna on June 6, 1945, from Klewań in Volhynia. Skwierzyna became a garrison town of the Polish Army. In 1970 a monument of King Władysław II Jagiełło was unveiled. In 2010 and 2011 the town was hit by floods.

== Sights ==
Main historic landmarks are the town hall and the Gothic church of Saint Nicholas with the Our Lady of Klewań, a venerated icon, which makes Skwierzyna a regional Christian pilgrimage site. The Ulica Marszałka Piłsudskiego ("Marshal Piłsudski Street") filled with historic townhouses and shops is the town's pedestrian zone. The Military Museum Atena contains several hundred exhibits, including military vehicles, pieces of combat vehicle equipment and military uniforms, including American. Skwierzyna's Jewish cemetery is one of the largest Jewish cemeteries in Lubusz Voivodeship.

== Demographics ==
Historical population

Year	Pop.	±%
1880	6,838	—
1890	6,560	−4.1%
1900	6,967	+6.2%
1910	6,713	−3.6%
1925	6,720	+0.1%

Year	Pop.	±%
1933	7,072	+5.2%
1950	3,904	−44.8%
1960	5,961	+52.7%
2010	10,098	+69.4%

== Sports ==
The local football team is Pogoń Skwierzyna. It competes in the lower leagues.

== Notable people ==
- Johann Christian Metzig (1804–1868), physician
- Johann Gottfried Piefke (1817–1884), musician and composer (Preußens Gloria)
- Sebastian Świderski (born 1977), volleyball player

== Twin towns – sister cities ==
See twin towns of Gmina Skwierzyna.

== Gallery ==
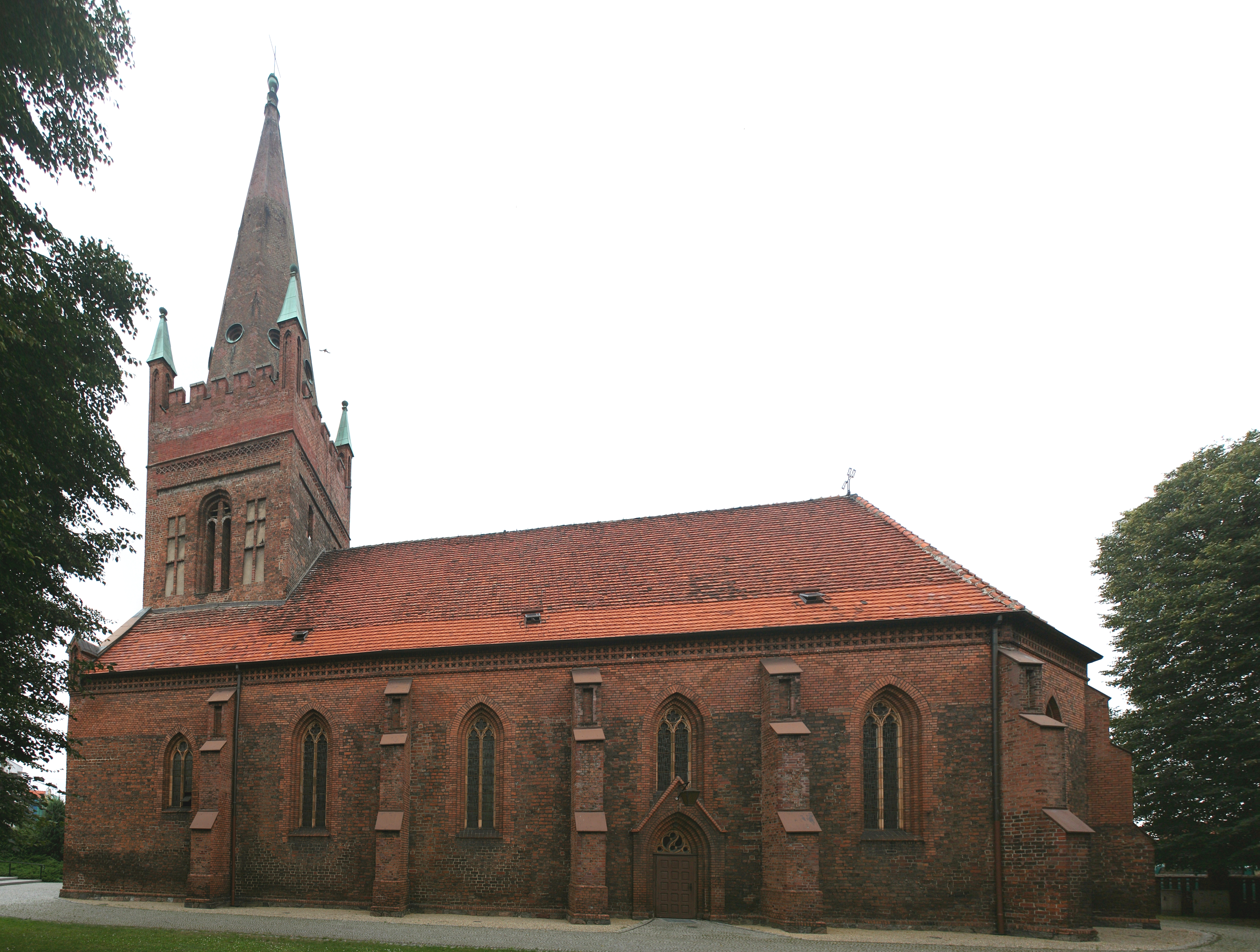
Saint Nicholas church

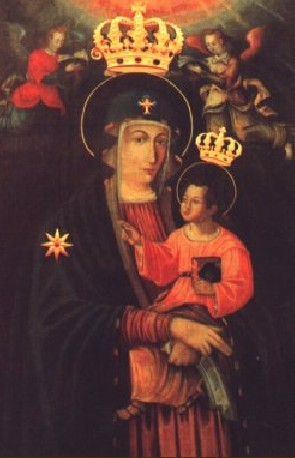
Our Lady of Klewań icon

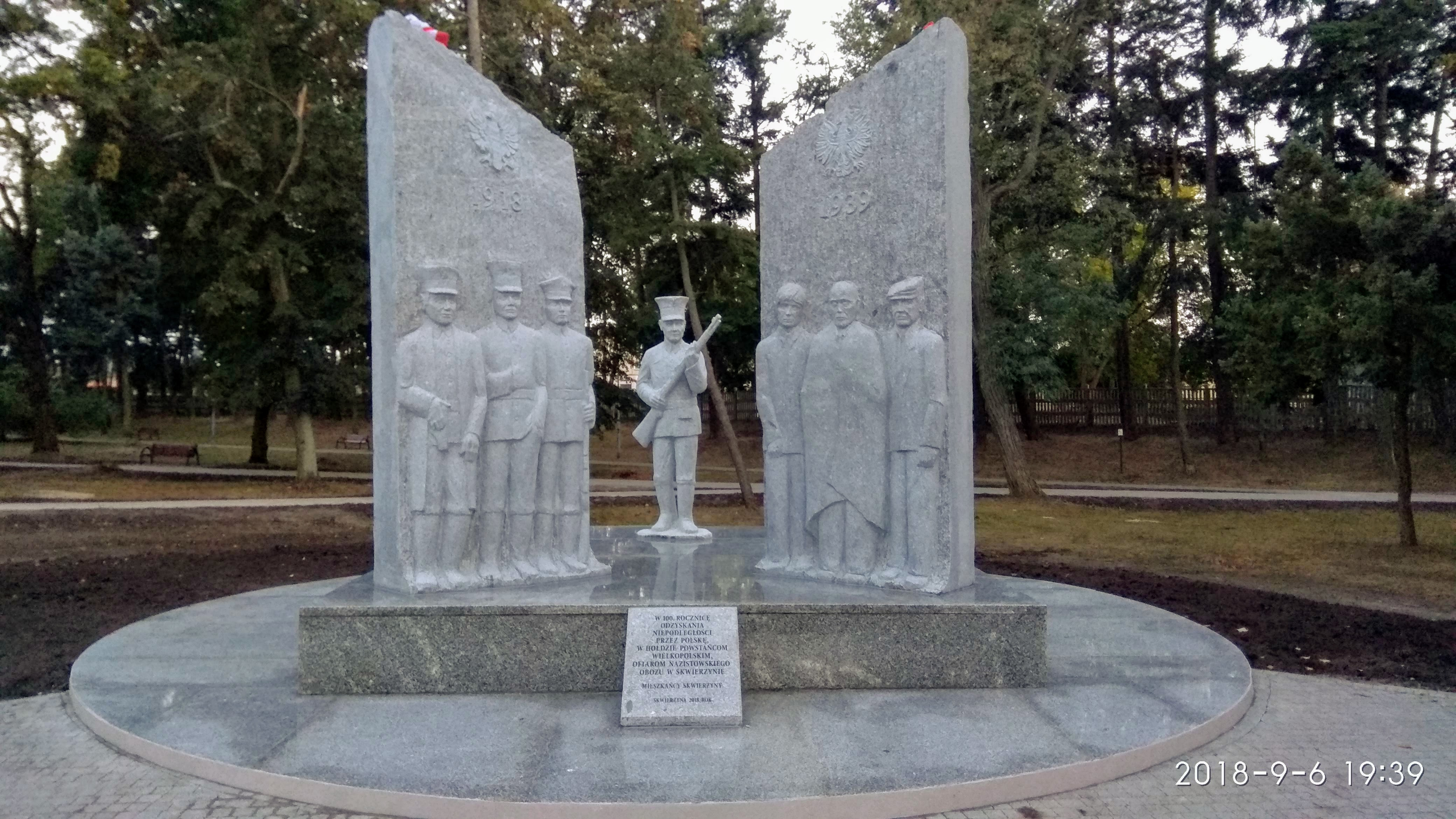
Monument to the heroes of the Greater Poland Uprising (1918–19)

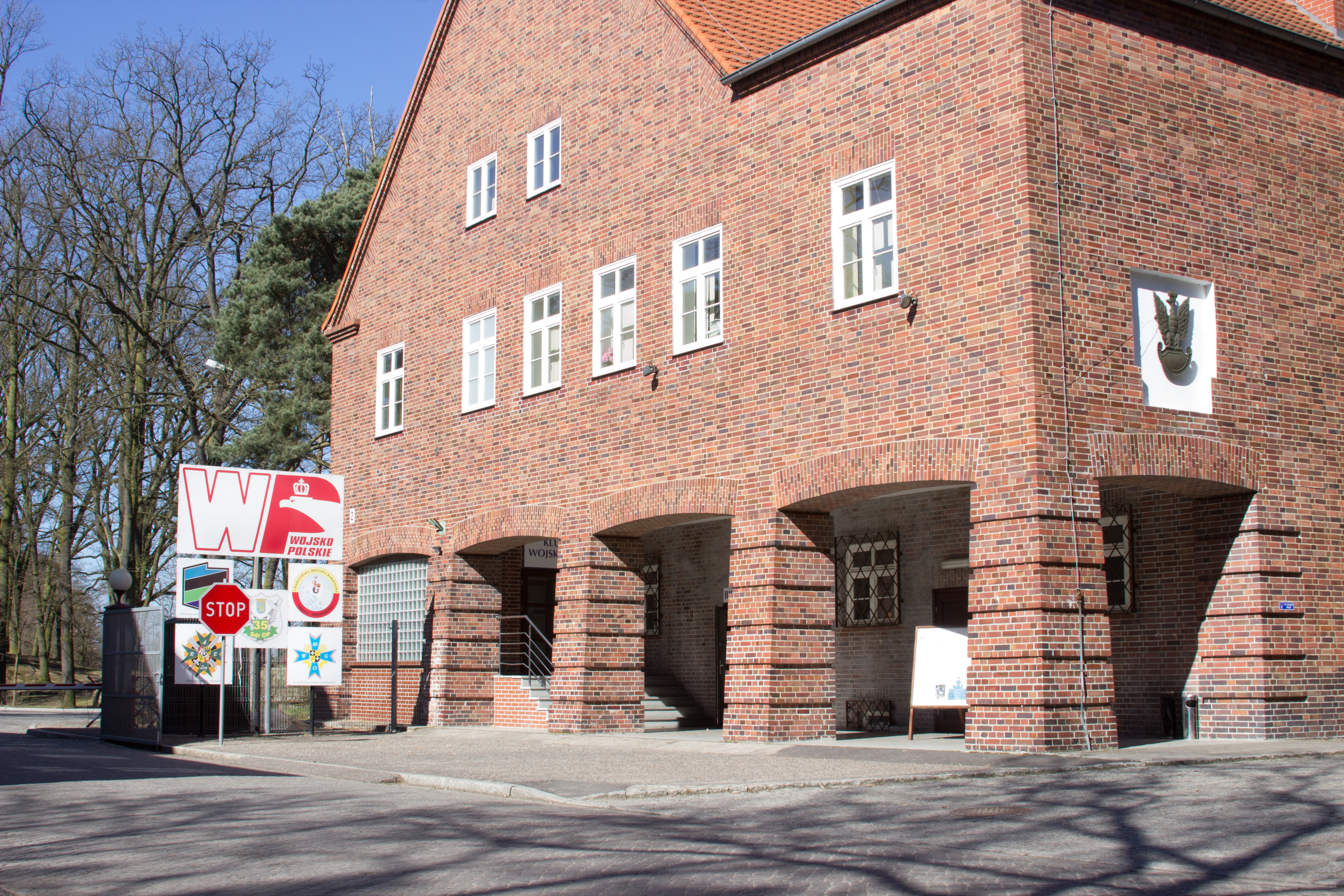
Polish Army barracks

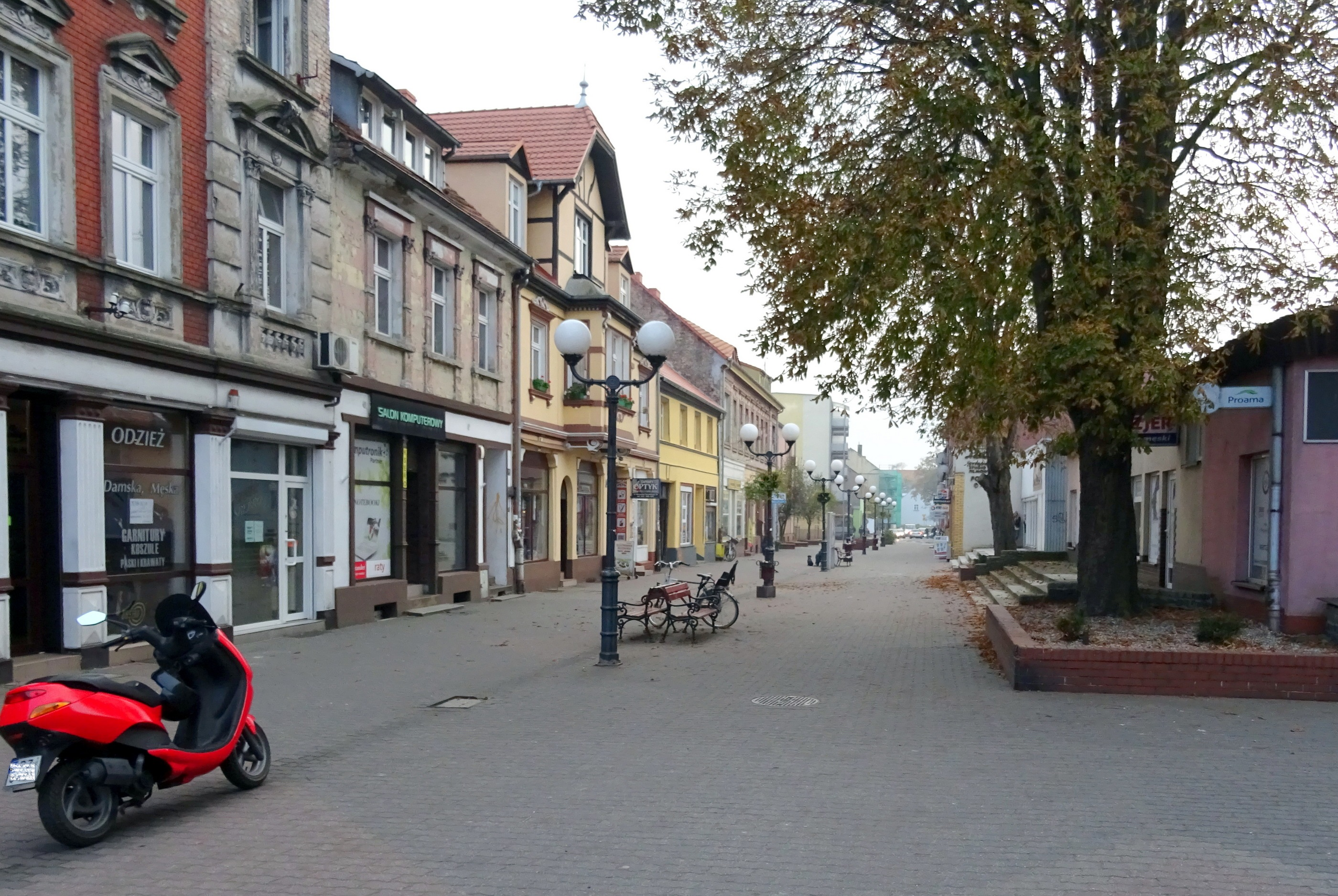
Ulica Marszałka Piłsudskiego
