= Johann Christian Metzig =

German physician

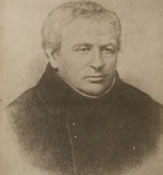
Johann Christian Metzig (1804–1868)

Johann Christian Heinrich Metzig (20 May 1804 – 1 October 1868) was a German medical doctor born in Schwerin an der Warthe. He was a notable figure of Polish independence efforts in the nineteenth century.

He studied medicine in Berlin, and following graduation remained in the city as a military doctor (1826–1831). After a stint as a garrison doctor at Strzalkow, near Wreschen, he was transferred to Lissa, where he served as a military physician. At Lissa he distinguished himself in his skillful work dealing with the severely wounded.

In 1848 Metzig began openly working for greater autonomy for the Polish people, proposing the creation of an independent state with its own parliament, constitution and university. His efforts in this cause did not sit well with German authorities. When the military decided to transfer him to Glogau, Metzig refused the move, choosing to stay in Lissa, where he opened a private medical practice. Here he worked tirelessly for the cause of Polish independence until his death in 1868.

== Published works ==
- 1835 "Das Kleid des Soldaten"
- 1845 "Reform des preußischen Militär-Medizinalwesens"
- 1848 1. Politische Schrift als Polenfreund nach Niederwerfung des poln. Aufstandes "Friede sei mit euch, liebet einander! Worte der Versöhnung an die Bewohner des Großherzogtums Posen".
- 1856 Suum cuique (in Polish - Kazdemu swoje)
- 1862 Die Wiederherstelung Polens (in Polish - Ponowne Powstanie Polski); (Re-establishment of the Polish).
- 1863 " Die wahre Lösung der preußischen Verfassungswirren"
- 1863 " Die Polenfrage"
- 1867 Vive la Pologne! Ein Weckeruf an das traumbefangene Europa (in Polish - Niech zyje Polska! Odezwa w celu zbudzenia uspionej Europy); (Long live Poland!, manifesto for awakening dormant Europe).
